= Princess Isabelle of Orléans (1900–1983) =

Isabelle of Orléans
- Countess Bruno d'Harcourt; Princess Pierre Murat
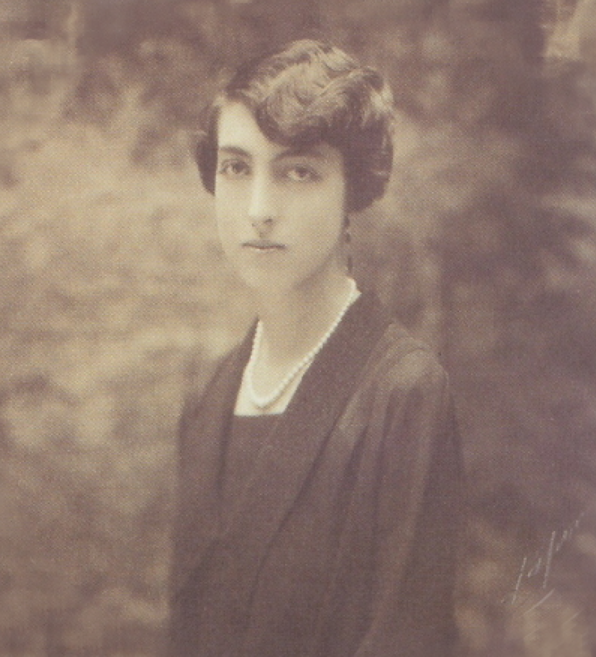
- Isabelle in 1920
- Born: 27 November 1900; Le Nouvion-en-Thiérache, France
- Died: 12 February 1983 (aged 82); Neuilly-sur-Seine, France
- Spouse: Count Bruno d'Harcourt (m. 1923; died 1930) Prince Pierre Murat (m. 1934; died 1948)
- Issue Detail: Count Bernard d'Harcourt; Countess Gilone de Dreux-Brézé; Princess Isabelle Murat; Monique Boulay de la Meurthe
Names
- Isabelle Françoise Hélène Marie d'Orléans
- House: House of Orléans; House of Harcourt (by marriage); House of Murat (by marriage)
- Father: Prince Jean, Duke of Guise
- Mother: Princess Isabelle of Orléans

Princess Isabelle Françoise Hélène Marie d'Orléans (27 November 1900, Le Nouvion-en-Thiérache, France – 12 February 1983, Neuilly-sur-Seine, France) was a member of the House of Orléans and, by marriage, a member of the ducal Harcourt family and of the princely House of Murat.

She was one of the four children of Prince Jean, Duke of Guise (1874–1940), who would become the Orleanist pretender to the French throne in 1926, and Princess Isabelle of Orléans. Although born in France, her parents moved the family to Morocco in 1909, then a French colony. She was with her mother and siblings visiting France when World War I broke out in 1914. While her father sought in vain to obtain permission from the French government to serve in the military, the rest of the family hastened back to Morocco.

== Marriages ==
In 1923 the tradition of Orléans princesses marrying only other royalty (since the alleged 1681 wedding of La Grande Mademoiselle) was dispensed with, as nearly all of her relatives attended Isabelle's wedding at Amélie of Orléans château in Le Chesnay on 12 September to Count Bruno d'Harcourt (1899–1930), son of Count Eugène d'Harcourt and Armande de Pierre de Bernis. An automobile racer, Harcourt was killed during practice for the Moroccan Grand Prix, leaving his wife with four children:

- Count Bernard d'Harcourt (1 January 1925 – 4 September 1958). His first marriage, on 4 November 1948, to Zénaïde Rachewska (1 September 1930 – 20 October 1973), ended in divorce and was childless. He wed secondly on 27 January 1951 Yvonne de Contades (22 April 1928 – 24 December 2021), and had issue from his second marriage:
  - Count Bruno Jean d'Harcourt (26 October 1951 – 14 May 2020)
  - Count François d'Harcourt (born 21 June 1953) married 4 July 1981 Colombe Anouilh (born 7 October 1956, daughter of Jean Anouilh and Nicole Lançon), with issue:
- Gilone d'Harcourt (1 January 1927 – 14 March 2019) married in 1950 Count Antoine de Dreux-Brézé (22 August 1928 – 13 May 2013), and has issue.
- Isabelle d'Harcourt (1927–1993) married 20 October 1948 Prince Louis Murat (1920–2004); son of Prince Paul Murat and Solange de La Rochefoucauld), and had issue.
- Monique d'Harcourt (7 January 1929 – 10 January 2025) married 3 July 1948 Alfred Boulay de la Meurthe (26 July 1925 – 6 January 2014) and has issue, including:
  - Gilone Boulay de la Meurthe (born 25 April 1949) married in 1975 Count Renaud de Clermont-Tonnerre (born 16 October 1950; son of Count Marie-Amédée de Clermont-Tonnerre and Rosanne Tailleferre); and has issue.
  - Laure Boulay de la Meurthe (born 27 April 1951), sometime publisher of Point de Vue, who has issue with Sir James Goldsmith, including Charlotte Colbert.
  - Yseult Boulay de la Meurthe (born 19 April 1956) married 25 August 1979 Alexandre de Blacas d'Aulps (20 December 1944 – 30 January 2003), son of Pierre, 6th Duc de Blacas, and Hélène de Blacas d'Aulps; and has issue.

As a widow, Isabelle remarried the Bonapartist Prince Pierre Murat (1900–1948) in 1934, at Jouy-en-Josas, "upon renunciation of the rank and prerogatives appertaining to princesses of the House of France". Prince Murat was a great-grandson of Prince Lucien Murat. No children were born of this marriage.

== Later life and death ==
In 1940, as World War II began and when her father died, Isabelle again took refuge at the family estate, Larache, in Morocco, where she shared quarters with her mother, and her elder sister the widowed Princess Françoise of Greece, along with her brother Henri, Count of Paris and the latter's son, Prince Michel d'Orléans.

Isabella often visited her parents in Morocco, Belgium and France, especially during World War II. Her father died in 1940. In 1953, her younger sister, Princess Françoise, widow of Prince Christopher of Greece, died in her Paris home after a long period of depression.

Princess Isabella herself died in 1983 and is buried in the Montparnasse Cemetery in Paris.

== Ancestry ==
Ancestors of Princess Isabelle of Orléans (1900–1983)

16. Louis Philippe I (= 20, 24, 28)
8. Prince Ferdinand Philippe, Duke of Orléans (= 12)
17. Maria Amalia of Naples and Sicily (= 21, 25, 29)
4. Prince Robert, Duke of Chartres
18. Frederick of Mecklenburg-Schwerin (= 26)
9. Duchess Helene of Mecklenburg-Schwerin (= 13)
19. Princess Caroline Louise of Saxe-Weimar-Eisenach (= 27)
2. Prince Jean, Duke of Guise
20. Louis Philippe I (= 16, 24, 28)
10. François, Prince of Joinville
21. Maria Amalia of Naples and Sicily (= 17, 25, 29)
5. Princess Françoise of Orléans
22. Pedro I of Brazil
11. Princess Francisca of Brazil
23. Maria Leopoldina of Austria
1. Princess Isabelle of Orléans
24. Louis Philippe I (= 16, 20, 28)
12. Prince Ferdinand Philippe, Duke of Orléans (= 8)
25. Maria Amalia of Naples and Sicily (= 17, 21, 29)
6. Prince Philippe, Count of Paris
26. Frederick of Mecklenburg-Schwerin (= 18)
13. Duchess Helene of Mecklenburg-Schwerin (= 9)
27. Princess Caroline Louise of Saxe-Weimar-Eisenach (= 19)
3. Princess Isabelle of Orléans
28. Louis Philippe I (= 16, 20, 24)
14. Prince Antoine, Duke of Montpensier
29. Maria Amalia of Naples and Sicily (= 17, 21, 29)
7. Infanta María Isabel of Spain
30. Ferdinand VII of Spain
15. Infanta Luisa Fernanda of Spain
31. Maria Christina of the Two Sicilies
