= Henri, Count of Paris (born 1933) =

French noble (1933–2019)

Henri d'Orléans
- Count of Paris, Duke of France
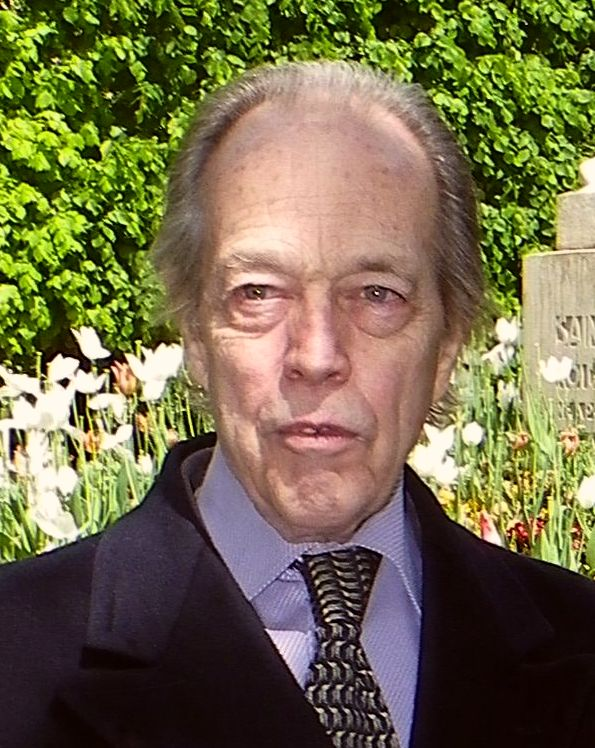
- Henri in 2014

Orléanist pretender to the French throne
- Pretence: 19 June 1999 – 21 January 2019
- Predecessor: Henri, Count of Paris
- Successor: Jean, Count of Paris
- Born: Henri Philippe Pierre Marie d'Orléans; 14 June 1933; Woluwe-Saint-Pierre, Belgium
- Died: 21 January 2019 (aged 85); Paris, France
- Burial: Chapelle royale de Dreux
- Spouse: Duchess Marie Therese of Württemberg (m. 1957; div. 1984) Micaela Cousiño Quiñones de León (m. 1984)
- Issue: Marie, Princess Gundakar of Liechtenstein; Prince François, Count of Clermont; Princess Blanche; Jean, Count of Paris; Prince Eudes, Duke of Angoulême
- House: Orléans
- Father: Henri, Count of Paris
- Mother: Princess Isabelle of Orléans-Braganza
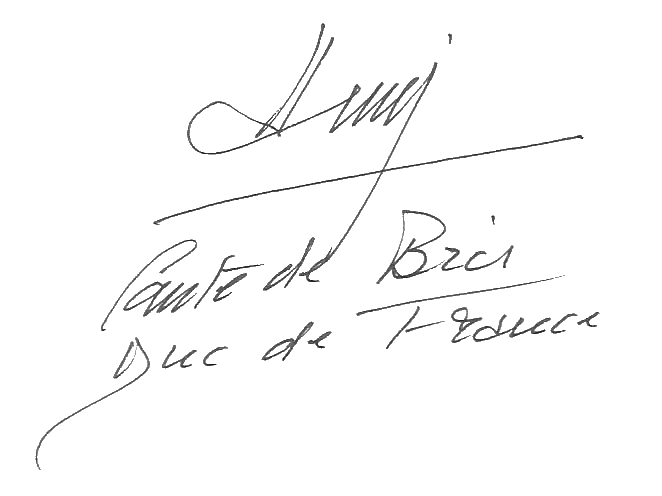
- Signature

Henri Philippe Pierre Marie d'Orléans (14 June 1933 – 21 January 2019) was the Orléanist pretender to the French throne from 1999 until his death. His supporters called him Henri VII. He held the courtesy title Count of Paris and also took the title Duke of France.

He was head of the House of Orléans as senior in male-line descent from King Louis Philippe I, who reigned from 1830 to 1848. Henri was a retired military officer as well as an author and painter.

== Early life ==
He was the eldest son of Henri, Count of Paris (1908–1999), and Princess Isabelle of Orléans-Braganza, and a descendant of King Louis Philippe I. He was born in Woluwe-Saint-Pierre, Belgium, because an 1886 law barred the heads of France’s former ruling families and their heirs from living in France.

Despite the ban, while living in Belgium Henri occasionally accompanied his mother on brief visits to France and, later, to his mother's relatives in Brazil. In August 1940 as World War II escalated, the family relocated to property they owned in Larache in the French protectorate of Morocco. While his father sought to play a role in the French resistance, Henri, then a child of seven, remained at Larache with his mother, siblings, grandmother and father's sisters' families during the Nazi occupation of France, sharing a small desert home that lacked electricity. Advised by Henri Giraud's Moroccan command that the Orléans had become unwelcome in the protectorate following the assassination of Vichy regime collaborater François Darlan by the monarchist Fernand Bonnier de La Chapelle, the family relocated to Pamplona in Spain until 1947, when they took up residence at the Quinta do Anjinho, an estate near Sintra, on the Portuguese Riviera. During that year, President Vincent Auriol allowed Henri and his brother François to visit France, and in 1948 he was allowed to enroll in a lycée in Bordeaux.

The law of exile was abrogated in 1950, allowing Henri to repatriate with his parents. Later that year, his parents purchased an estate near Paris, the Manoir du Cœur-Volant in Louveciennes, which became Henri's first home in France. He was one of the over 100 European royal personages who took part in a cruise organized by King Paul of Greece and Queen Frederica in 1954, which became known as the "Cruise of the Kings".

Henri studied at the Institut d'Études Politiques de Paris (Sciences Po), obtaining his bac in 1957, and on 30 June of that year, his father conferred upon him, as the heir apparent of his house, the title of "Count of Clermont".

== Career and Military Service ==
From October 1959 to April 1962, Henri worked at the Secretariat-General for National Defence and Security as a member of the French Foreign Legion. Transferred from there to a garrison in Germany, he took up a new assignment as military instructor at Bonifacio in Corsica, where his wife and children joined him early in 1963.

Returning to civilian life in 1967, Henri and his family briefly occupied the Blanche Neige pavilion on the grounds of his father's Cœur-Volant estate before renting an apartment of their own in the 15th arrondissement of Paris. In the early 1970s he managed public relations for the Geneva office of a Swiss investment firm while dwelling in Corly.

=== Writing and other activities ===
Henri wrote several books including:

- À mes fils (1989)
- Adresse au futur chef d'État (1994)
- Désolé, Altesse, c’est mon jour de sortie (1994)
- La France survivra-t-elle à l'an 2000 (1997)
- Le passeur de miroir (2000)
- La France à bout de bras (2002)
- L'histoire en héritage (2003)
- La Royauté de l'Homme (2016)

Henri was also a painter and launched his own brand of perfume. His political career included unsuccessfully contesting the 2004 European elections for the Alliance Royale, a monarchist party.

== Marriages and children ==
Henri met Duchess Marie Therese of Württemberg (born 1934), like himself a descendant of King Louis-Philippe, at a ball given by the Thurn and Taxis family in Munich. They were married on 5 July 1957 at the Royal Chapel of Dreux, on which occasion President Charles de Gaulle publicly offered congratulations, calling the wedding a great national event and observing that the dynasty and couple's future were bound to the hopes of France. Five children were born from this union:

1. Princess Marie d'Orléans (born 3 January 1959 in Boulogne-sur-Seine) married civilly in Dreux, on 22 July 1989, and religiously in Friedrichshafen, on 29 July 1989, to Prince Gundakar of Liechtenstein (born on 1 April 1949 in Vienna), and has issue:
  1. Princess Léopoldine of Liechtenstein (born 27 June 1990, Vienna)
  2. Princess Marie Immaculata of Liechtenstein (born 15 December 1991, Vienna)
  3. Prince Johann Wenzel of Liechtenstein (born 17 March 1993, Vienna)
  4. Princess Margarete of Liechtenstein (born 10 January 1995, Vienna)
  5. Prince Gabriel of Liechtenstein (born 6 May 1998, Vienna)
2. Prince François, Count of Clermont (7 February 1961 in Boulogne-sur-Seine – 30 December 2017)
3. Princess Blanche Elisabeth Rose Marie d'Orléans (born 10 September 1963 in Ravensburg).
4. Prince Jean, Count of Paris (born 19 May 1965, Boulogne-sur-Seine), married civilly in Paris on 19 March 2009 with Maria Philomena Magdalena Juliana Johanna de Tornos y Steinhart, and religiously at the Senlis Cathedral on 2 May 2009. The couple has six children:
  1. Prince Gaston of Orléans (born 19 November 2009, Paris)
  2. Princess Antoinette d'Orléans (born 28 January 2012, Vienna)
  3. Princess Louise-Marguerite d'Orléans (born 30 July 2014, Poissy)
  4. Prince Joseph d'Orléans (born 2 June 2016)
  5. Princess Jacinthe d'Orléans (born 9 October 2018)
  6. Prince Alphonse d'Orléans (born 31 December 2023)
5. Prince Eudes, Duke of Angoulême, (born 18 March 1968, Paris), married civilly in Dreux on 19 June 1999, and religiously in Antrain on 10 July 1999, to Marie-Liesse de Rohan-Chabot (born on 29 June 1969 in Paris), with whom he has two children.
  1. Princess Thérèse d'Orléans (born 23 April 2001, Cannes)
  2. Prince Pierre d'Orléans (born 6 August 2003, Cannes).

In 1984, Henri and Marie-Thérèse were divorced. On 31 October 1984 Henri entered a civil marriage with Micaëla Anna María Cousiño y Quiñones de León (1938–2022), daughter of Luis Cousiño y Sebire and his wife, Antonia Maria Quiñones de Léon y Bañuelos, 4th Marquesa de San Carlos, and who had previously been divorced from Jean-Robert Bœuf. For remarrying without consent, Henri's father initially declared him disinherited, substituting the non-dynastic title Comte de Mortain for his son's Clermont countship (the latter once held in appanage by a son of Louis IX of France, who became ancestor of the Bourbon-Orléans line). Henri, though, refused all mail addressed to him as "Mortain". On 27 February 1984 Marie-Thérèse, the former Countess of Clermont, was granted the title Duchess of Montpensier by her father-in-law.

On 11 February 1989 Henri was informed, by a hand-delivered letter written by his former wife, of the engagement of their eldest child Marie, to Prince Gundakar of Liechtenstein, a cousin of the ruler of that principality, the wedding date being set for 29 July 1989. Although Henri acknowledged, in a 12 May 1989 Point de Vue interview, that it had been three years since he had seen Marie, he and his second wife, Micaëla Cousiño, had been welcomed for the first time to the home of his mother, the Countess of Paris, that day: Henri further acknowledged to the press that, Marie having written to invite him to her wedding, he looked forward to conducting her to the altar, rumours to the contrary notwithstanding. At the engagement party held the next day at the Palais Pallavicini, the Vienna home of the fiancé's parents, photographs were taken, and would later be published, showing Henri speaking cordially with his daughter, sons, former wife and future son-in-law.

However, it was on this occasion that Henri learned that he would not be escorting Marie to her bridegroom during the wedding. Meanwhile, Marie-Thérèse had sent out invitations to the wedding in her name alone, omitting not only mention of Marie's father, but also of her grandfather, Monseigneur the Count of Paris who, until then, had largely sided with the Duchess of Montpensier in family matters and had consented to his granddaughter's choice of a spouse. This prompted father and son to join in calling for a familial boycott of the nuptials. Henri and his father refused to attend the wedding but Marie proceeded to marry civilly at Dreux's city hall on 22 July 1989, and religiously at the castle of her mother's brother in Germany, on 29 July 1989. All but two of Henri's eight siblings also boycotted the ceremonies, but his sister Diane (wife of Montpensier's brother) hosted, and Henri's mother, Madame the Countess of Paris, was a guest at the religious wedding.

Tensions lessened after several years, and on 7 March 1991 Henri's father reinstated him as heir apparent and Count of Clermont, simultaneously giving Micaëla the title "Princesse de Joinville".

In 1980, Henri joined the Grand Orient de France where he became Grand Master of the regular Masonic Lodge "Lys de France" No 1297. In 2001, he left Freemasonry to become the head of the House d'Orléans. In the first half of the 2000s, he covered also the charge of Great Official of the Grande Loge de Marque de France.

== Head of the house of Orleans ==
Until he succeeded his father as royal claimant, Henri and his second wife occupied an apartment in Paris. On 19 June 1999, Henri's father died and he became the new head of the House of Orléans. He took the traditional title, Count of Paris, adding an ancient one, Duke of France, not borne by his Orléans or Bourbon forebears, but used a thousand years ago by his ancestors, before Hugh Capet took the title of king. His wife assumed the title "Duchess of France", deferring to the continued use of "Countess of Paris" by Henri's widowed mother until her death on 5 July 2003, whereupon Micaela assumed that title.

After his father's death, Henri annulled his father's decision to deprive his brothers Michel (Count of Évreux) and Thibaut (the late Count of La Marche) of their succession rights because Michel married a French noblewoman without permission and because Thibaut married a commoner. He also bestowed titles upon the sons of his brother Prince Jacques, Duke of Orléans: Prince Charles-Louis d'Orléans, Duke of Chartres (born 1972), and Prince Foulques d'Orléans, Duke of Aumale and Count of Eu (born 1974).

Henri recognised his disabled eldest son François as his dynastic heir-apparent, with the title Count of Clermont, declaring that François would exercise his prerogatives as head of the dynasty under the "regency" of his younger brother Prince Jean, Duke of Vendôme. However, with François' death on 30 December 2017, Vendôme became the Orléanist heir-apparent.

In 2009, Henri obtained an annulment of his marriage to Marie-Thérèse of Württemberg from the Holy See. He remarried his second wife, Micaëla Ana Cousiño (1938-2022), in the Catholic Church in September of that year.

As Count of Paris, Henri took part in some European royal events attending, for instance, the 2011 marriage of Albert II of Monaco.

== Legal cases ==
Prior to succeeding his father as royal claimant, Henri launched an unsuccessful court case (1987–1989) in which he challenged the right of his rival paternal 10th cousin Louis-Alphonse, Duke of Anjou, to use the undifferenced royal arms of France and the Anjou title. The French courts dismissed the case on the grounds that Henri failed to prove that he had demonstrated a right to the hereditaments in questions, noting also that the court lacked jurisdiction in a dispute over dynastic claims of France's former royal family.

After his father's death, a court-appointed lawyer searched through the late count's effects on behalf of his nine living children, to reclaim what remained of the family's dissipated fortune. Jewels, art-work, and an exceptional medieval illustrated manuscript were found. These were auctioned off, raising approximately US$14 million.

In 2000 bailiffs pursued Henri for US$143,000 back rent after he fled the Villa Boileau, a 17th-century Paris house he had occupied.

== Ancestors ==
Ancestors of Henri, Count of Paris (born 1933)

8. Prince Robert, Duke of Chartres
4. Prince Jean, Duke of Guise
9. Princess Françoise of Orléans
2. Prince Henri, Count of Paris
10. Prince Philippe, Count of Paris
5. Princess Isabelle of Orléans
11. Princess Marie Isabelle of Orléans
1. Prince Henri, Count of Paris
12. Prince Gaston, Count of Eu
6. Pedro de Alcântara, Prince of Grão-Pará
13. Isabel, Princess Imperial of Brazil
3. Princess Isabelle of Orléans-Braganza
14. Johann Wenzel II, Count Dobrzensky of Dobrzenicz
7. Countess Elisabeth Dobrzensky of Dobrzenicz
15. Countess Elisabeth Kottulinsky of Kottulin-Krzizkowitz

== Honours ==
- France:
  - Knight of the National Order of the Legion of Honour (30 April 2008)
  - Cross for Military Valour (8 May 1959)
  - Combatant Cross
  - North Africa Security and Order Operations Commemorative Medal
- Protector of the Orléans Obedience of the Military and Hospitaller Order of Saint Lazarus of Jerusalem (12 September 2014, resign at Easter 2012)
- Montenegro, House of Montenegro: Grand-Cross with Gold Star of the Order of Prince Danilo I (3 December 2005)
- Two Sicilies House of Bourbon-Two Sicilies: Bailiff Knight Grand Cross of Justice of the Calabrian Sacred Military Constantinian Order of Saint George
- House of Württemberg: Knight Grand Cross of the Order of the Crown

== See also ==
- List of French monarchs

== Bibliography ==
- Opfell, Olga S. (2001). "H.R.H. Henri, Count of Paris: Royal House of France House of Bourbon-Orleans". Royalty Who Wait: The 21 Heads of Formerly Regnant Houses of Europe. Jefferson: McFarland. pp. 21–32. ISBN 9780786409013.
- Mallalieu, Huon (9 December 2015). "Art Market: Vive la Revolution!". Country Life: 88–89.

Henri, Count of Paris (born 1933) House of Orléans Cadet branch of the House of Bourbon Born: 14 June 1933
French nobility
Preceded by Henri	Duke of France; Count of Paris; 19 June 1999 – 21 January 2019	Succeeded by Jean
Titles in pretence
Preceded by Henri VI	— TITULAR — King of France; Orléanist pretender 19 June 1999 – 21 January 2019; Reason for succession failure: Orléans monarchy deposed in 1848	Succeeded by Jean IV
Preceded by Henri VI	— TITULAR — Dauphin of France; 25 August 1940 – 19 June 1999	Succeeded by François
