= Henri, Count of Paris (born 1908) =

Pretender to the French throne

Henri d'Orléans
- Count of Paris
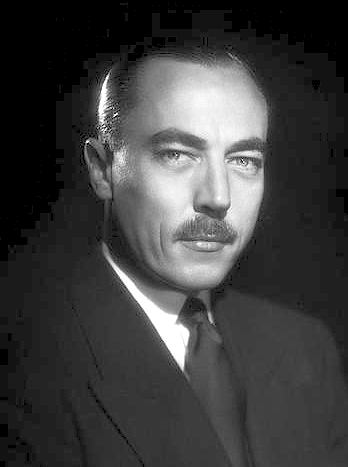
- The Count of Paris in 1951

Orléanist pretender to the French throne
- Pretence: 25 August 1940 – 19 June 1999
- Predecessor: Jean, Duke of Guise
- Successor: Henri, Count of Paris
- Born: 5 July 1908; Le Nouvion-en-Thiérache, France
- Died: 19 June 1999 (aged 90); Cherisy, France
- Burial: Chapelle royale de Dreux
- Spouse: Princess Isabelle of Orléans-Braganza (m. 1931)
- Issue Detail: Princess Isabelle, Countess of Schönborn-Buchheim; Prince Henri, Count of Paris; Hélène, Countess Evrard of Limburg-Stirum; Prince François, Duke of Orléans; Princess Anne, Dowager Duchess of Calabria; Diane, Dowager Duchess of Württemberg; Prince Michel, Count of Évreux; Prince Jacques, Duke of Orléans; Princess Claude, Duchess of Aosta; Chantal, Baroness François Xavier of Sambucy de Sorgue; Prince Thibaut, Count of La Marche
Names
- Henri Robert Ferdinand Marie Louis Philippe
- House: Orléans
- Father: Prince Jean, Duke of Guise
- Mother: Princess Isabelle of Orléans
- Religion: Roman Catholicism
- Military career
- Allegiance: France
- Branch: French Foreign Legion
- Conflicts: World War II; Algerian War
- Awards: Legion of Honour; Cross for Military Valour; Combatant's Cross; Colonial Medal

Henri d'Orléans (Henri Robert Ferdinand Marie d'Orléans; 5 July 1908 – 19 June 1999), was the Orléanist pretender to the defunct throne of France as Henry VI from 1940 until his death in 1999. Henri was the direct descendant of Philippe I, Duke of Orléans, son of Louis XIII. He was also a descendant of Louis XIV through a female line, from his legitimized daughter Françoise Marie de Bourbon, as well as the great-great-grandson, by four different lines of descent, of Louis Philippe I. He used the style of Count of Paris.

The son of Prince Jean, Duke of Guise, Henri was forbidden to enter France for much of his life. Nonetheless, he remained devoted to serving France, having enlisted in the French Foreign Legion and fighting in World War II and the Algerian War. After being permitted to re-enter France in 1950, he soon became heavily engaged in French monarchist politics. Henri worked to restore the French monarchy in a parliamentary form, and discussed the topic with Charles de Gaulle. He received notable support from French monarchists but all attempts to restore the monarchy ultimately failed. Upon his death in 1999, his son Henri succeeded him as Head of the House of Orléans.

== Youth and education ==
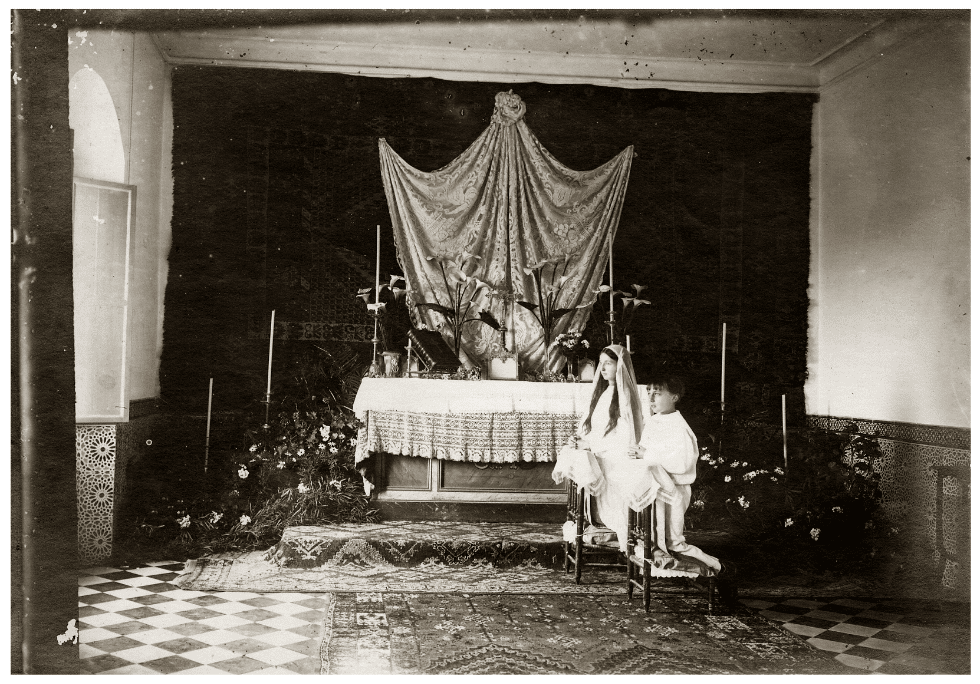
Henri and his sister, Princess Anne of Orléans, preparing to receive their First Communion.

He was born at the Château of Le Nouvion-en-Thiérache in Aisne, France to Prince Jean, Duke of Guise (1874–1940), and Isabelle of Orléans (1878–1961). His family moved to Larache, Morocco in 1909, purchasing a plantation in the Spanish sector, Maarif, and one in the French sector, Sid Mohammed ben Lahsen, after Morocco became a French protectorate in 1912. Here, Henri rose at 4 am daily, accompanying his father to oversee livestock management and crop production on their scattered lands, later in the day being tutored by European governesses and his mother: He acquired fluency in French, Arabic, English, German, Italian and Spanish. He visited relatives in France often, spending the beginning of World War I in Paris while his father sought to fight on the side of the French. Being rebuffed by France, Belgium and the United Kingdom, Prince Jean finally took his family back to Morocco and farming.

In 1921, Henri's governesses were replaced with a series of preceptors, all coming from France. First among these was the abbé Carcenat from Auvergne. In 1923, the abbé Thomas took over Henri's instruction and, being less traditional in his approach, awakened in his charge a hitherto undetected thirst for knowledge. Using the wedding of the prince's sister that year in France as an opportunity, Thomas obtained permission to take Henri to the Parisian banlieues of Meudon and Issy-les-Moulineaux, then working class slums in which the abbé would volunteer to serve the needy daily, bringing Henri into close contact with day laborers. He would later write that this wretched urban experience profoundly affected his future political outlook and sense of justice, contrasting unfavourably with the deprivation to which he was accustomed in Morocco where, he observed, the poor were at least able to enjoy fresh air, space and sunlight while surrounded by relatives and neighbors who shared a near universal poverty, compared to the depressing grime, crowded conditions and anonymity in which Parisian workers toiled amidst extremes of wealth and deprivation. After a year Thomas, whose health suffered in Morocco, was replaced as Henri's preceptor by abbé Dartein, who accompanied the family to France in 1924, preparing the prince for his collegiate matriculation while they occupied an apartment near his parents in Paris.

Henri began a two-year study of mathematics and the sciences at the Catholic University of Louvain in 1924, studying the law for the two years following. His father, having become heir presumptive to the royal claims of the House of Orléans in 1924, betook the family to Europe again but, now banned by law from living openly in France, took up residence at the Manoir d'Anjou, a 15 hectare estate in Woluwe-Saint-Pierre near Brussels, Belgium that had been purchased in 1923 for 75,000 francs. From across the border in France came scholars and veterans of renown to coach Henri for his future role as a royalist leader, including jurist Ernest Perrot, military strategist Général Henri de Gondrecourt and the diplomat Charles Benoist, a member of the Académie des Sciences Morales et Politiques who would serve as his advisor from 1930.

== Dauphin in pretence ==
In 1926, Henri became the Dauphin of France in pretence when his father became the Orléanist claimant to the defunct throne upon the death of his maternal uncle, Prince Philippe, Duke of Orléans.

In 1939, after being refused admission to both the French and the British armed forces, Henri was allowed to join the French Foreign Legion. As a member of the Legion, he participated in the Second World War and the Algerian War for Independence.

== Orléanist pretender ==
=== World War II ===
Henri became pretender to the defunct French throne on 25 August 1940 when his father died. As the Fall of France had occurred about two months earlier, much of his early reign in pretence was marked by World War II.

Henri was a "gentleman farmer" in Morocco in the course of 1942.

In mid-November 1942, after Admiral François Darlan's armistice with the Allied invaders of North Africa, Vichy intelligence official Henri d'Astier de la Vigerie attempted to promote a royalist coup (d'Astier had previously conspired with the Allies to aid the invasion). D'Astier proposed to his friend Ridgeway Knight about the possibility of this coup, asking what "would you Americans think if the Comte de Paris appeared on the scene?" He proposed that Henri would appear to head a French government composed of all political tendencies, and maintain "neutrality until the day comes when the French nation can freely decide for itself." Ridgeway was taken aback by the proposal, but was unaware that d'Astier's colleagues, Abbé Cordier and Master-Sergeant Sabatier (a French instructor at an OSS-SOE camp in Algiers), had secretly brought Henri from Morocco to d'Astier's apartment in Algiers. The plan was supposedly backed by the presidents of three Algerian conseils generaux, who had signed a joint letter urging Darlan to resign in favour of this plan. Both Darlan and U.S. General Eisenhower nixed the idea, however, with Darlan ignoring the letters and Eisenhower having given a firm "no" after hearing about the plan. Darlan was assassinated by Fernand Bonnier de La Chapelle, a pro-Orléanist member of the French Resistance, on 24 December 1942.

=== Post war ===
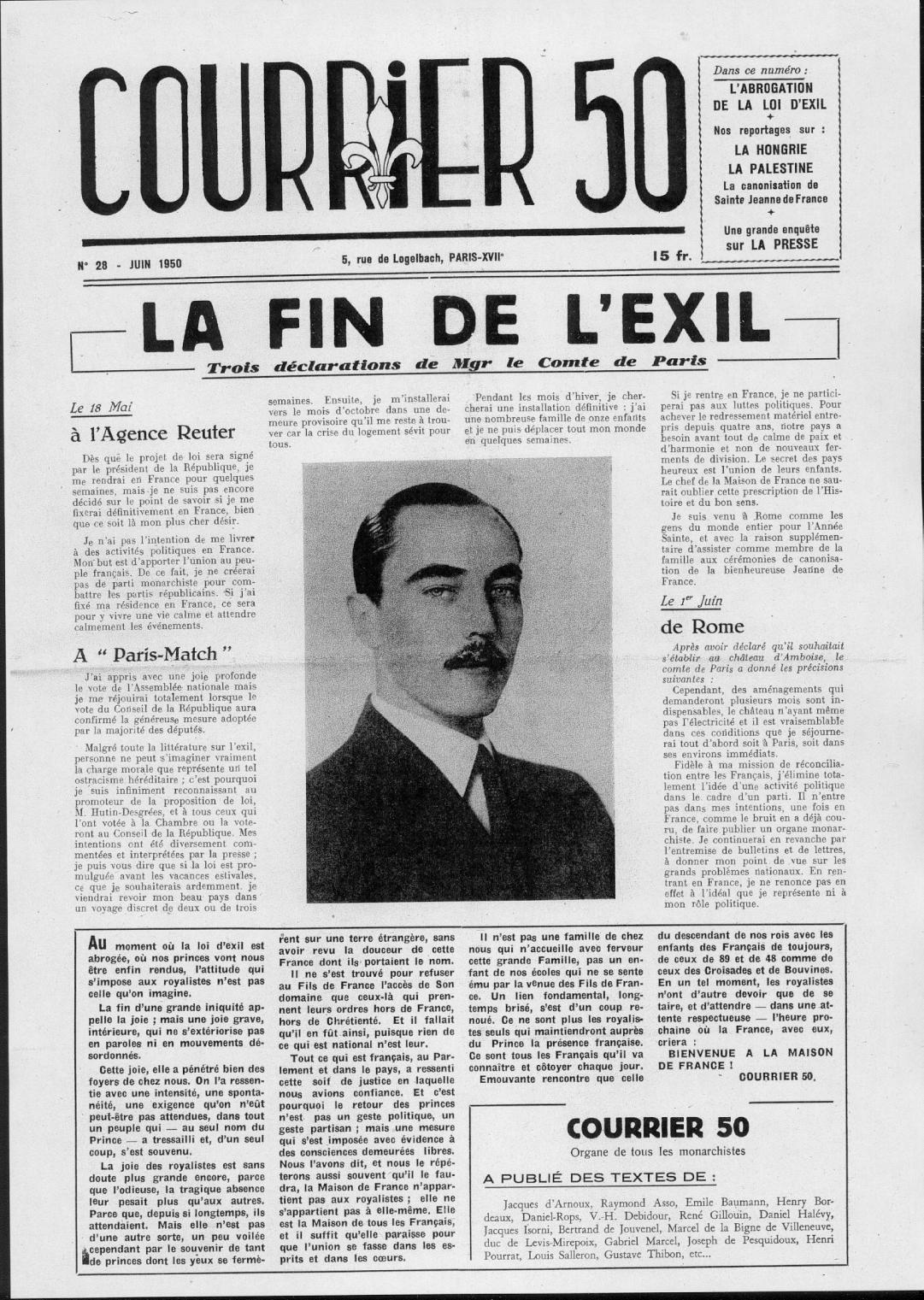
Front page of Courier 50 in June 1950, announcing the end of the exile of the Count of Paris.

In 1947, Henri and his family took up residence at the Quinta do Anjinho, an estate in Sintra, on the Portuguese Riviera.

In 1950, after the law of exile was rescinded, Henri returned to France. During his tenure as pretender to the defunct throne, Henri used the majority of his family's great wealth, selling off family jewels, paintings, furniture and properties to support his political cause and large family, as well as establishments in Belgium, North Africa, Brazil, Portugal and France. The family château at Amboise now belongs to a trust he created. Conflict over the division of the family wealth (formerly worth over £40 million) led to court conflicts between him and five of his children, some of whom he unilaterally disinherited. (See also: Goods of the House of Orleans.)

=== Political activity ===
Unlike his father, Henri devoted his life to politics. During World War II, Henri was initially sympathetic to Vichy France. His opinions on the government changed over time, and he contacted Prime Minister Pierre Laval. Laval offered Henri the unglamorous position of Minister of Food, which he declined.

In Algeria, Henri attempted to convince the French military governor not to oppose an Anglo-American military landing. Henri had correctly predicted such a thing occurring, but at the time he was laughed at by the officers. He later flew to Rome, to consult with the pope, and to Vichy, to talk with Philippe Pétain. He attempted to convince Pétain to transfer the Vichy government to North Africa. Henri also tried to mediate between Charles de Gaulle and Henri Giraud, when the two men were competing for control of Free France.

Between 1940 and 1941, the Gaullist camp offered Henri an invitation to go to London, which he declined. Henri feared that if he accepted the offer, he would have become an émigré, like the Bourbons who returned to France after Napoleon's defeat. Henri was staunchly opposed to the idea of siding with one political party, wishing instead to pursue a path of unity and not contribute to France's "infernal divisiveness." Charles de Gaulle later confided to his biographer, Phillipe Saint-Robert, that "Had the count of Paris joined me in London in 1940, he would have become France. Together, we could have done great things."

In 1948, Henri began publishing a monthly bulletin, which soon possessed 30,000 subscribers.

In 1950, the French Parliament abrogated the Law of Exile, permitting Henri to return. He then returned to his home country, with his wife and children, and proclaimed his loyalty to democracy. He created a foundation which restored the Orleans castle at Amboise, and then opened it to the French public. While some Legitimists contested his succession, due to his controversial ancestor Philippe Égalité, the vast majority of the tens of thousands of French monarchists nonetheless threw their support behind him. Still, some held their grievances with the Orléans family. Author Charles Fenyvesi said that he was once told by an aristocratic lady that "I detest the Orléans." She continued,

"They are upstarts, typical second sons, a younger branch that tries to make up for what it missed at birth. Unfortunately, we have no real Bourbons left any more...So we have to make do with Henri, who strikes a royal enough pose, I guess. But the descendant of Philippe Égalité and Louis-Phillipe that he is, he has never stopped courting the socialists.

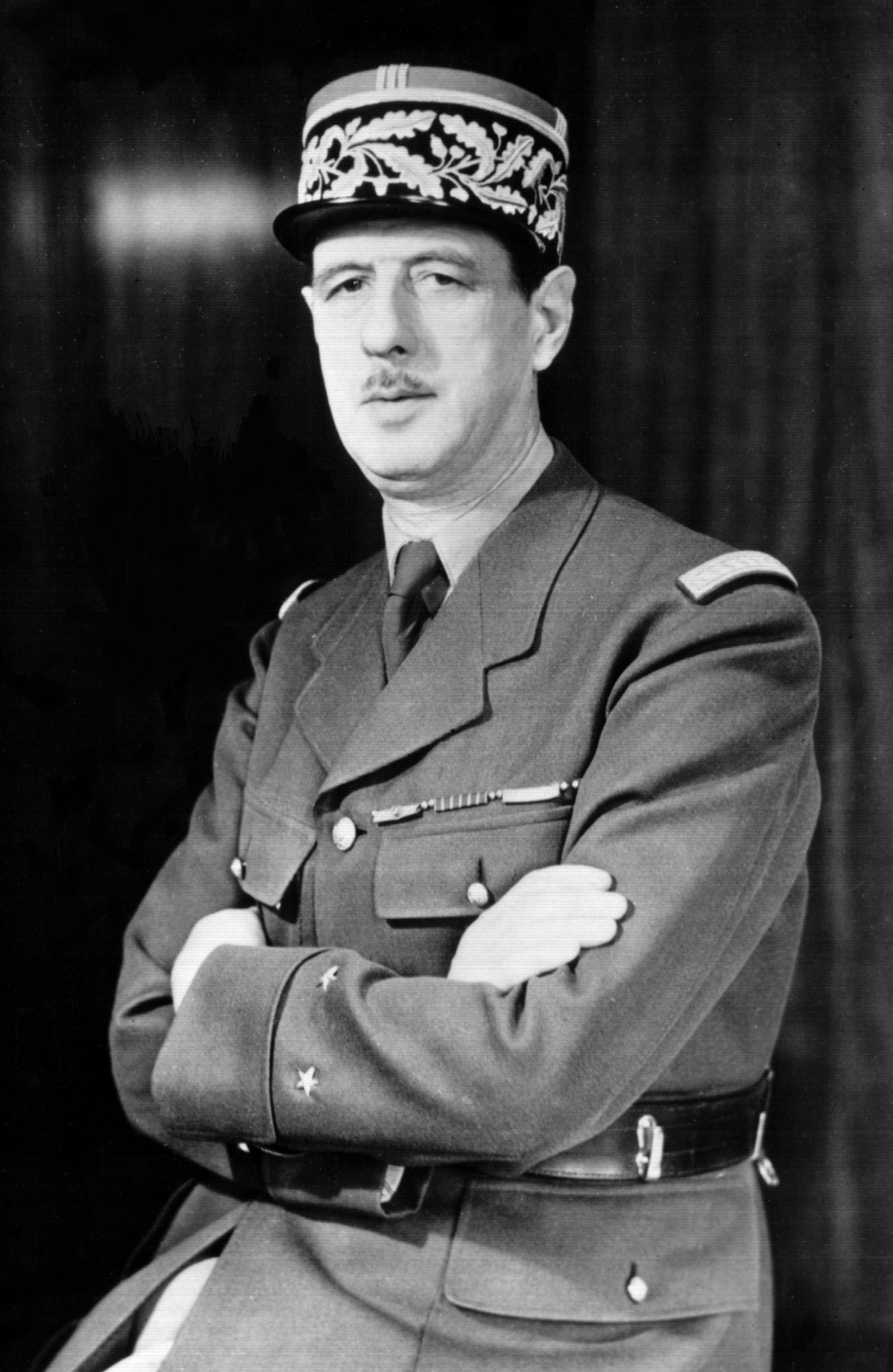
Charles de Gaulle

In 1954, Henri met Charles de Gaulle and continued their relationship through correspondence. In 1958, Henri gave his support to de Gaulle, who was called back from his self-imposed exile to save the French Republic from insurrection in Paris. Thereafter, Henri became a frequent visitor to the Élysée Palace, where de Gaulle waited for Henri "by the staircase or outside, reserved a special armchair for him and lit his cigarette." There, they frequently discussed French history together, with Henri noting that de Gaulle loved to pronounce the word 'king'.

In 1960, de Gaulle told Henri that "Monseigneur, I believe deeply in the value of the monarchy, and I am certain as well that this regime is the one best suited to our poor country." The following year, de Gaulle dispatched Henri on a tour to Libya, Ethiopia, Iran, and Lebanon, with the purpose of explaining France's Algeria policy, serving as de Gaulle's special representative, or "pro-consul." During this time, Henri befriended Hassan II of Morocco and Habib Bourguiba. In 1962, de Gaulle informed Henri in strict confidence that he had arranged the French presidential election so that the head of the royal house could succeed him as president of the Republic. Georges Pompidou confirmed this, telling a close friend that "I know the general has made up his mind in favor of the count of Paris." However, by 1964, de Gaulle changed his mind and told Henri of his decision to run for re-election, which he won. By 1968, Henri ceased publication of his paper over his increasing disagreements with the Gaullists. The Countess of Paris remarked that "Under de Gaulle, Henri came two fingers close to becoming king. But by 1968, it was all over, finished."

Following de Gaulle's death in 1970, his son Philippe de Gaulle told Henri, "Monseigneur, my father often told me that if circumstances had been different, he would have been happy to be your faithful and loyal servant." In 1979, Henri published his book Mémoires d'exil et de combats, which revealed to the public that de Gaulle had asked Henri to prepare himself for the 1965 presidential elections in France. In a latter interview, Henri stated "At all times de Gaulle desired restoration, I am convinced of it. He thought monarchy was the form of government most adequate for the French people under the present conjunction." However, Henri also noted that "It was difficult to get anywhere without de Gaulle, He agreed to favor my ascension to the highest point, but he didn't understand that it was necessary to give me the means of getting there."

Henri stated that he believes de Gaulle never forgave him for refusing to join the Free French in London, and also noted that "De Gaulle was not my friend...De Gaulle and I shared some common ideals and I agreed with him on the essentials of his approach to politics...I believe he was sincere when he wished that France may return to a monarchy. But once he was in power for a few years, he changed his ideas."

In 1988, Henri produced a scandal among his monarchist supporters when he supported the re-election of François Mitterrand, a socialist.

=== Political beliefs ===
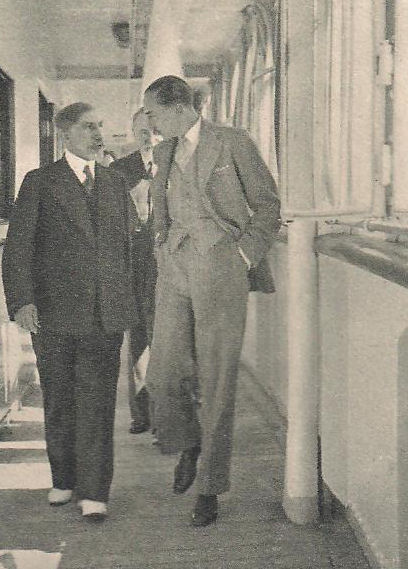
Henri with Charles Maurras in 1934.

In his college years, Henri spent many nights listening to the French monarchist writer Charles Maurras. But during his adult life, Henri considered himself a centrist and never allied with any political party. On Action Française, Henri stated that it had many talented leaders, but he ultimately regarded it as "a Rightist party with extreme Right sympathies." In Henri's view, "no one should be in a position to claim a monopoly on the monarchist idea."

Henri befriended politicians on both the left and right, and declined to run for Parliament, despite de Gaulle's suggestion that he should do so. His political strategy was to court the political Left and ignore the Right, knowing that the Right possessed no choice but to back him. Some rightist critics of Henri regarded him as "the Crown Prince of the Republic" or "a dyed-in-the-wool socialist, if not a Jacobin." The Countess of Paris described her husband as "an authoritarian and an absolutist."

Henri was a critic of primogeniture and favored elective monarchy over hereditary. He believed that France should possess a council of state, which would be entrusted with the duty of finding the most worthy successor within the royal family.

== Marriage and family life ==
On 8 April 1931, he married Princess Isabelle of Orléans-Braganza. The wedding was celebrated in Palermo Cathedral in Sicily, the same church where their common ancestors, Louis Philippe of France and his Queen Maria Amalia, married in 1809. Guests at the wedding included official representatives of the Brazilian, Italian, Greek, Belgian, Danish, and Spanish royal families. The Count and Countess of Paris had eleven children. They separated in 1986, but never divorced. With five of their children, they took part in the ship tour organized by King Paul of Greece and Queen Frederica in 1954, which became known as the "Cruise of the Kings" and was attended by over 100 royals from all over Europe.

In 1984, Henri declared that his son, Henri of Orléans, had lost his rights of inheritance because he had divorced his first wife and married a second time, outside of the Roman Catholic Church. Henri gave his son the lesser-valued title comte de Mortain in place of comte de Clermont, and removed him from the line of succession. After a couple of years, Henri reinstated his son with his previous titles, including reestablishing him as heir apparent and gave his new wife, Micaela Cousiño Quinones de Leon, the title "princesse de Joinville".

Henri deprived his sons Thibaut and Michel of their rights of succession to the defunct throne, because one married a commoner and the other wed a noblewoman whose father had been compromised during the Vichy regime. Later, relenting somewhat, he recognised non-dynastic titles for their wives and children. His decision was later annulled by his son and successor, Henri.

== Death ==
Henri, Count of Paris, died of prostate cancer at Cherisy, near Dreux, France, aged 90 on 19 June 1999. His death was mourned by republican leaders on both the political left and right, having been well liked in France due to his political finesse. He was survived by his wife, 9 children, and 41 grandchildren.

Incidentally, his grandson Prince Eudes, Duke of Angoulême married on the very same day.

== Issue ==
Henri, Count of Paris, and his wife Isabelle had eleven children:

Name	Birth	Death	Notes
Princess Isabelle	8 April 1932 (age 94)		married Friedrich Karl, Count of Schönborn-Buchheim; has issue.
Prince Henri, Count of Paris	14 June 1933	21 January 2019 (aged 85)	married 1st Duchess Marie Thérèse of Württemberg; had issue, married 2nd Micaela Cousiño Quiñones de León; no issue.
Princess Hélène	17 September 1934 (age 92)		married (1957 in Dreux) Count Evrard de Limburg Stirum; has issue.
Prince François, Duke of Orléans	15 August 1935	11 October 1960 (aged 25)	died in the Algerian War
Princess Anne	4 December 1938 (age 87)		married Infante Carlos, Duke of Calabria; has issue.
Princess Diane	24 March 1940 (age 86)		married Carl, Duke of Württemberg; has issue.
Prince Michel, Count of Évreux	25 June 1941 (age 85)		married 1st Béatrice Pasquier de Franclieu; has issue (including Charles-Philippe d'Orléans), married 2nd Bárbara de Posch-Pastor; no issue.
Prince Jacques, Duke of Orléans	25 June 1941 (age 85)		married Gersende de Sabran-Pontevès; has issue.
Princess Claude	11 December 1943 (age 82)		married 1st Prince Amedeo, Duke of Aosta; has issue, married 2nd Arnaldo La Cagnina; no issue, married 3rd Enrico Gandolfi; no issue.
Princess Chantal	9 January 1946 (age 80)		married Baron François Xavier of Sambucy de Sorgue; has issue.
Prince Thibaut, Count of La Marche	20 January 1948	23 March 1983 (aged 35)	married Marion Gordon-Orr; had issue.

== Ancestry ==
Ancestors of Henri, Count of Paris (born 1908)

8. Prince Ferdinand Philippe, Duke of Orléans
4. Prince Robert, Duke of Chartres
9. Duchess Helene of Mecklenburg-Schwerin
2. Prince Jean, Duke of Guise
10. François, Prince of Joinville
5. Princess Françoise of Orléans
11. Princess Francisca of Brazil
1. Prince Henri, Count of Paris
12. Prince Ferdinand Philippe, Duke of Orléans (= 8)
6. Prince Philippe, Count of Paris
13. Duchess Helene of Mecklenburg-Schwerin (= 9)
3. Princess Isabelle of Orléans
14. Prince Antoine, Duke of Montpensier
7. Princess Marie Isabelle of Orléans
15. Infanta Luisa Fernanda of Spain

Henri, Count of Paris (born 1908) House of Orléans Cadet branch of the House of Bourbon Born: 5 July 1908 Died: 19 June 1999
Titles in pretence
Preceded by Jean III	— TITULAR — King of France; Orléanist pretender 25 August 1940 – 19 June 1999	Succeeded by Henri VII
Vacant Title last held by Philippe (VIII)	— TITULAR — Dauphin of France; 28 March 1926 – 25 August 1940	Succeeded by Henri VII
