= Camille Mathéi de Valfons =

French politician

Camille Mathéi de Valfons (11 January 1837, Nîmes - 1 July 1907) was a French Orléanist politician. He was a member of the National Assembly from 1871 to 1876 and a member of the Chamber of Deputies from 1876 to 1881.
