= Le Courrier français =

Le Courrier français may refer to:

- Le Courrier français (1820–1851), a Liberal journal published in France
- Le Courrier français (1884–1913), a satirical magazine published in France
- Le Courrier français (1948–1950), a royalist monthly published by the supporters of the Count of Paris
