= Bruno d'Harcourt =

French noble and racecar driver

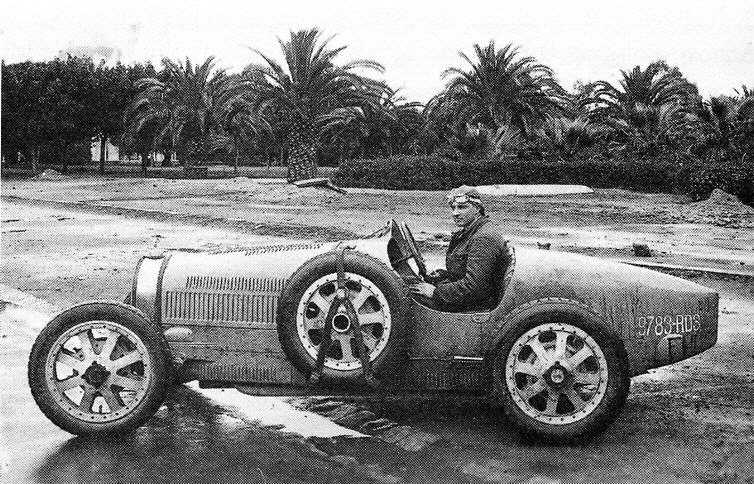
- Bruno d'Harcourt, 1930
- Nationality: French
- Born: September 20, 1899 Vevey, Switzerland
- Died: 19 April 1930 (aged 30) Casablanca, Morocco

Marie Hervé Jean Bruno d'Harcourt, Comte d'Harcourt (20 September 1899 – 19 April 1930) was a member of the French nobility and a Grand Prix motor racing driver.

== Biography ==
Comte Bruno d'Harcourt was born in Vevey, Vaud, Switzerland, the son of Comte Eugène d'Harcourt (1859–1918), French composer and conductor, and Armande de Pierre de Bernis. On 15 September 1923 he married Isabelle Françoise Hélène Marie d'Orléans, Princesse de France, daughter of Prince Jean, Duke of Guise (regarded as King Jean III by Monarchists) and Isabelle d'Orléans.

The couple had four children:

- Count Bernard d'Harcourt (1 January 1925 in Larache – 4 September 1958 in Larache), married first on 4 November 1948 to Zénaïde Rachewska (1 September 1930 in New York City – 20 October 1973 in Nepal), daughter of Vladimir Rachewski and Harriet Strauss, married second on 27 January 1951 in Paris to Yvonne de Contades (22 April 1928 in Paris – 24 December 2021 in Paris), daughter of Jean de Contades and Jacqueline du Bouays de La Bégassière, had issue from his second marriage:
  - Count Bruno Jean d'Harcourt (26 October 1951 in Paris – 14 May 2020 in Paris)
  - Count François d'Harcourt (born 21 June 1953 in Paris), married on 4 July 1981 to Colombe Anouilh (born 7 October 1956, daughter of Jean Anouilh and Nicole Lançon), with issue:
    - Countess Marie-Solène d'Harcourt (born 1 August 1990).
    - Countess Isabelle d'Harcourt (born 28 July 1996)
- Countess Gilone d'Harcourt (1 January 1927 – 14 March 2019), who married on 1950 to Count Antoine de Dreux-Brézé (22 August 1928 – 17 May 2013), with issue:
  - Countess Laure de Dreux-Brézé (born 23 April 1951). Married to Thierry Normand, has issue:
    - Antoine Normand (born 19 November 1975)
    - Thibaut Normand (born 8 June 1976)
  - Countess Anne de Dreux-Brézé (26 February 1952 – 6 February 1953)
  - Countess Diane de Dreux-Brézé (born 5 February 1954). Married first on 9 June 1973 to Bruno Pourroy de Quinsonas-Oudinot; they got divorced in 1979 and she married second on 28 April 1990 to Ghislain Houzel; she has issue from both marriages:
    - Constance Pourroy de Quinsonas-Oudinot (born 25 July 1977)
    - Anne-Françoise Houzel (born 9 January 1992)
  - Countess Isabelle de Dreux-Brézé (12 September 1958 – 1965)
  - Count Anne-Pierre de Dreux-Brézé (12 September 1958 – 14 September 1958)
- Countess Isabelle d'Harcourt (1927–1993), who married on 20 October 1948 prince Louis Murat (1920–2004; son of prince Paul Murat and Solange de La Rochefoucald), had issue:
  - Prince Pierre Murat (born 17 October 1949). Married to Chantal Caillat (born 4 May 1954), has issue:
    - Princess Julie Murat (born 18 September 1992)
    - Prince Charles Murat (born 30 June 1995)
  - Prince Xavier Murat (16 July 1951 – 30 September 1951)
  - Princess Leïla Murat (born 17 March 1953). Married first on 2 May 1974 Olivier Duhamel (born 2 May 1950); married second Sherif El Hakim (born 17 August 1943); has issue from her second marriage:
    - Osman El Hakim (born 22 January 1982)
    - Ismaël El Hakim (born 27 July 1983)
    - Soliman El Hakim (born 28 June 1988)
    - Nadia El Hakim (born 9 March 1993)
  - Princess Laura Murat (born 20 September 1954). Married first on 10 April 1979 Bruno Bailly (born 19 March 1955); married second count Thierry de Montalambert (born 7 September 1949; son of count Charles de Montalambert and Marie-Françoise Bemberg); has issue from both marriages:
    - Sarah Bailly (born 20 January 1980)
    - Damien Bailly (born 28 March 1983)
    - Count Thomas de Montalambert (born 27 December 1991)
    - Countess Isabelle de Montalambert (born 9 February 1994)
    - Countess Alexia de Montalambert (born 30 November 1995)
  - Prince Bernard Murat (born 20 January 1959). Married on 7 September 1997 to Svetlana Rojkova (born 16 May 1970); has issue:
    - Prince Guillaume Murat (born 25 June 2004)
    - Prince Vladimir Murat (born 16 December 2008)
    - Prince Dimitri Murat (born 10 April 2002)
  - Prince Jerôme Murat (born 2 April 1966). Married to Katarzyna Zaleska (born 24 July 1976); has issue:
    - Princess Rose Murat (born 3 November 2014)
    - Princess Isabelle Murat (born 3 November 2014)
- Countess Monique d'Harcourt (7 January 1929 – 10 January 2025), who married on 3 July 1948 count Alfred Boulay de la Meurthe (26 July 1925 – 6 January 2014; son of count Emmanuel Boulay de la Meurthe and Gabrielle Marguerite Marie Jacqueline Eme de Marcieu), has issue:
  - Countess Gilone Boulay de la Meurthe (born 25 April 1949). Married in 1975 count Renaud de Clermont-Tonerre (born 16 October 1950; son of count Marie-Amédèe de Clermont-Tonnerre and Rosanne Tailleferre); has issue:
    - Countess Adélaïde de Clermont-Tonerre (born 20 March 1976). Married on 24 September 2011 to Laurent Delpech, has issue:
      - Alexis Delpech (born 14 April 2015)
      - Maxime Delpech (born 14 April 2015)
    - Count Hadrien de Clermont-Tonerre (born 8 May 1980). Married on 24 April 2010 to Philippine Reille (born 1981)
  - Countess Laure Boulay de la Meurthe (born 27 April 1951). Never married but has issue with Sir James Goldsmith:
    - Charlotte Goldsmith (born 31 May 1983). Married on 8 June 2013 to Philip Colbert.
    - Jethro Goldsmith (born 24 June 1987)
  - Countess Yseult Boulay de la Meurthe (born 19 April 1956). Married on 25 August 1979to Alexandre de Blacas d'Aulps (20 December 1944 – 30 January 2003; son of Pierre de Blacas d'Aulps, 6th Duc de Blacas, and Hélène de Blacas d'Aulps), has issue:
    - Marguerite de Blacas d'Aulps (born 11 February 1980)
    - Diane de Blacas d'Aulps (born 10 December 1981)

Bruno d'Harcourt took up automobile racing where he met the celebrated female driver, Hellé Nice.

Bruno d'Harcourt died at age 30 in Casablanca, Morocco when his Bugatti crashed at the Anfa racetrack while on a practice run for the 1930 Moroccan Grand Prix. The day prior to the race, Harcourt took his Bugatti out for an early morning practice run on the road course and crashed when he ran off the first bend. Severely injured, he died a few days later in hospital.

== Ancestry ==
Ancestors of Bruno d'Harcourt

8. François Eugène, Duc d'Harcourt
4. Comte Bruno Jean Marie d'Harcourt
9. Aglaé Terray
2. Comte Eugène d'Harcourt
10. Charles d'Andigné, Marquis de la Châsse
5. Marie Juliette d'Andigné de la Châsse
11. Pauline de Villeneuve-Vence
1. Bruno, Count of Harcourt
12. Léon Armand Marie Aimé de Pierre, Marquis de Bernis
6. Hervé de Pierre de Bernis
13. Camille Madeleine Le Peletier de Rosanbo
3. Armande de Pierre de Bernis
14. Gustave Luce
7. Gabrielle Luce
15. Charlotte Elisabeth Baronnet
