= Prince Jean, Duke of Guise =

French prince; pretender to the French throne

Jean d'Orléans
- Duke of Guise
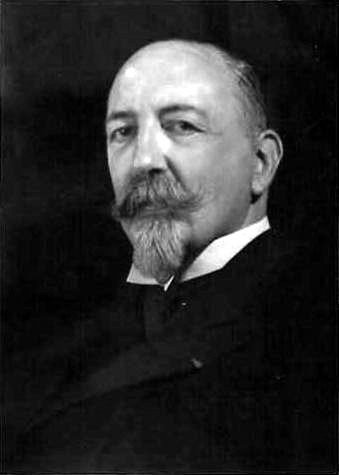

Orléanist pretender to the French throne
- Pretence: 28 March 1926 – 25 August 1940
- Predecessor: Philippe, Duke of Orléans
- Successor: Henri, Count of Paris
- Born: 4 September 1874; Paris, France
- Died: 25 August 1940 (aged 65); Larache, Spanish Morocco
- Burial: Chapelle royale de Dreux
- Spouse: Princess Isabelle of Orléans (m. 1899)
- Issue: Isabelle, Princess Pierre Murat; Françoise, Princess Christopher of Greece and Denmark; Princess Anne, Duchess of Aosta; Prince Henri, Count of Paris
Names
- Jean Pierre Clément Marie d'Orléans
- House: Orléans
- Father: Prince Robert, Duke of Chartres
- Mother: Princess Françoise of Orléans
- Religion: Roman Catholic
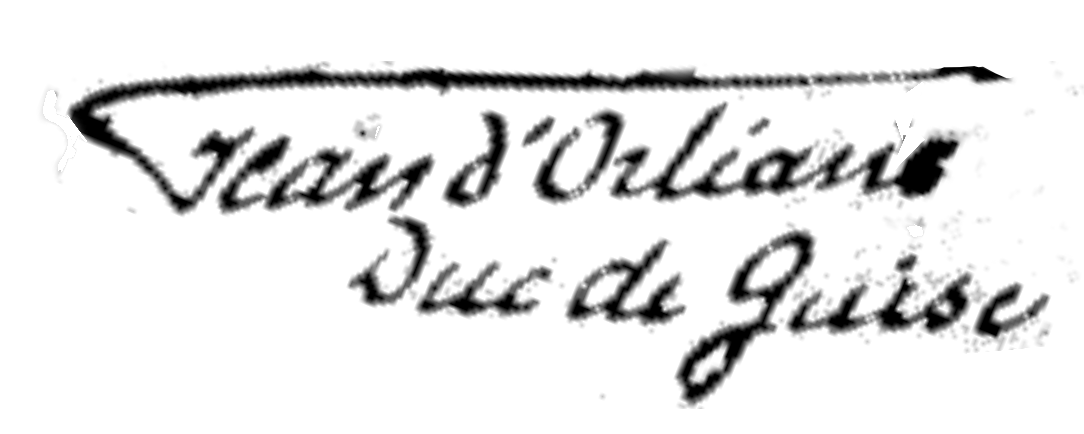
- Signature

Jean d'Orléans (Jean Pierre Clément Marie; 4 September 1874 – 25 August 1940) was Orléanist pretender to the defunct French throne as Jean III. He used the courtesy title of Duke of Guise.

He was the third son and youngest child of Prince Robert, Duke of Chartres (1840–1910), and grandson of Prince Ferdinand Philippe, Duke of Orléans and great-grandson of Louis Philippe I, King of the French. His mother was Princess Françoise of Orléans, daughter of François d'Orléans, Prince of Joinville and Princess Francisca of Brazil.

== Biography ==
In 1892, Jean passed the entrance exam for the Royal Danish Military Academy and joined the Royal Life Guards. He continued to serve in the Royal Danish Army until 1899, where he was made captain à la suite.

In 1926 at the death of his cousin and brother-in-law Philippe, Duke of Orléans, claimant to the defunct throne of France as "Philip VIII", Jean was recognised by his Orléanist supporters as titular king of France with the name "Jean III".

Jean was an amateur historian and archeologist, who lived with his family in a large farm near Rabat, Morocco. Following his "ascension" as Orléanist pretender, he and his eldest son were legally forbidden from ever entering France again, due to an 1886 edict which condemned the heads of the Bourbon and Bonaparte dynasties, as well as their heirs apparent, to exile.

Jean died in Larache, Morocco, in 1940. He was succeeded as Orléanist claimant to the defunct French throne by his only son, Henri d' Orléans, Count of Paris.

=== Marriage and issue ===
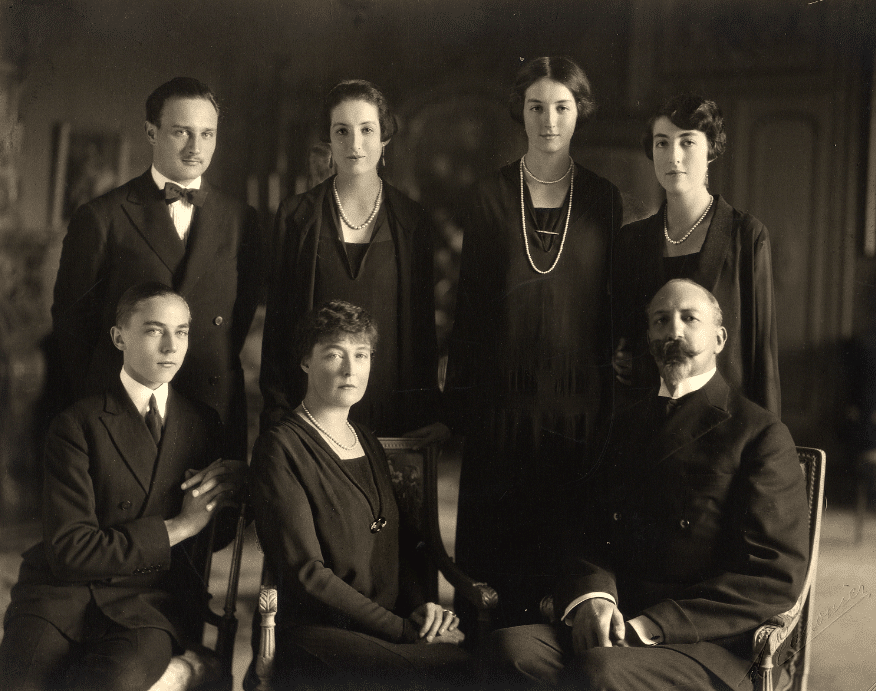
Left to right (standing): Bruno, Count of Harcourt, Princess Françoise of Orléans, Princess Anne of Orléans, & Princess Isabelle of Orléans. Left to right (seated): Henri, Count of Paris, Princess Isabelle of Orléans, & Prince Jean, Duke of Guise.

In 1899, Jean married his first cousin, Isabelle d'Orléans (1878–1961). She was the younger sister of Philip VIII, and the daughter of Philip VII and Marie Isabelle d'Orléans.

They had four children:

- Isabelle d'Orléans (1900–1983). First married in 1923 to Marie Hervé Jean Bruno, Count of Harcourt (1899–1930) and then to Prince Pierre Murat in 1934.
- Françoise d'Orléans (1902–1953). Married to Christopher of Greece and Denmark in 1929. He was a son of George I of Greece and Grand Duchess Olga Constantinovna of Russia. They were parents of Prince Michael of Greece and Denmark.
- Anne d'Orléans (1906–1986). She married Amedeo, 3rd Duke of Aosta in 1927.
- Henri d'Orléans, Count of Paris (1908–1999). Married to Princess Isabelle of Orléans-Braganza.

== Ancestry ==
Ancestors of Prince Jean, Duke of Guise

8. Louis Philippe I of France
4. Prince Ferdinand Philippe, Duke of Orléans
9. Princess Marie Amélie of Naples and Sicily
2. Prince Robert, Duke of Chartres
10. Frederick Louis, Hereditary Grand Duke of Mecklenburg-Schwerin
5. Duchess Helene of Mecklenburg-Schwerin
11. Princess Caroline Louise of Saxe-Weimar-Eisenach
1. Prince Jean, Duke of Guise
12. Louis Philippe I of France (= 8)
6. François d'Orléans, Prince of Joinville
13. Princess Marie Amélie of Naples and Sicily (= 9)
3. Princess Françoise of Orléans
14. Pedro I of Brazil and IV of Portugal
7. Princess Francisca of Brazil
15. Archduchess Maria Leopoldina of Austria

Prince Jean, Duke of Guise House of Orléans Cadet branch of the House of Bourbon Born: 4 September 1874 Died: 25 August 1940
Titles in pretence
Preceded by Philippe VIII	— TITULAR — King of France; Orléanist pretender 28 March 1926 – 25 August 1940	Succeeded by Henri VI
