= Eugène d'Harcourt =

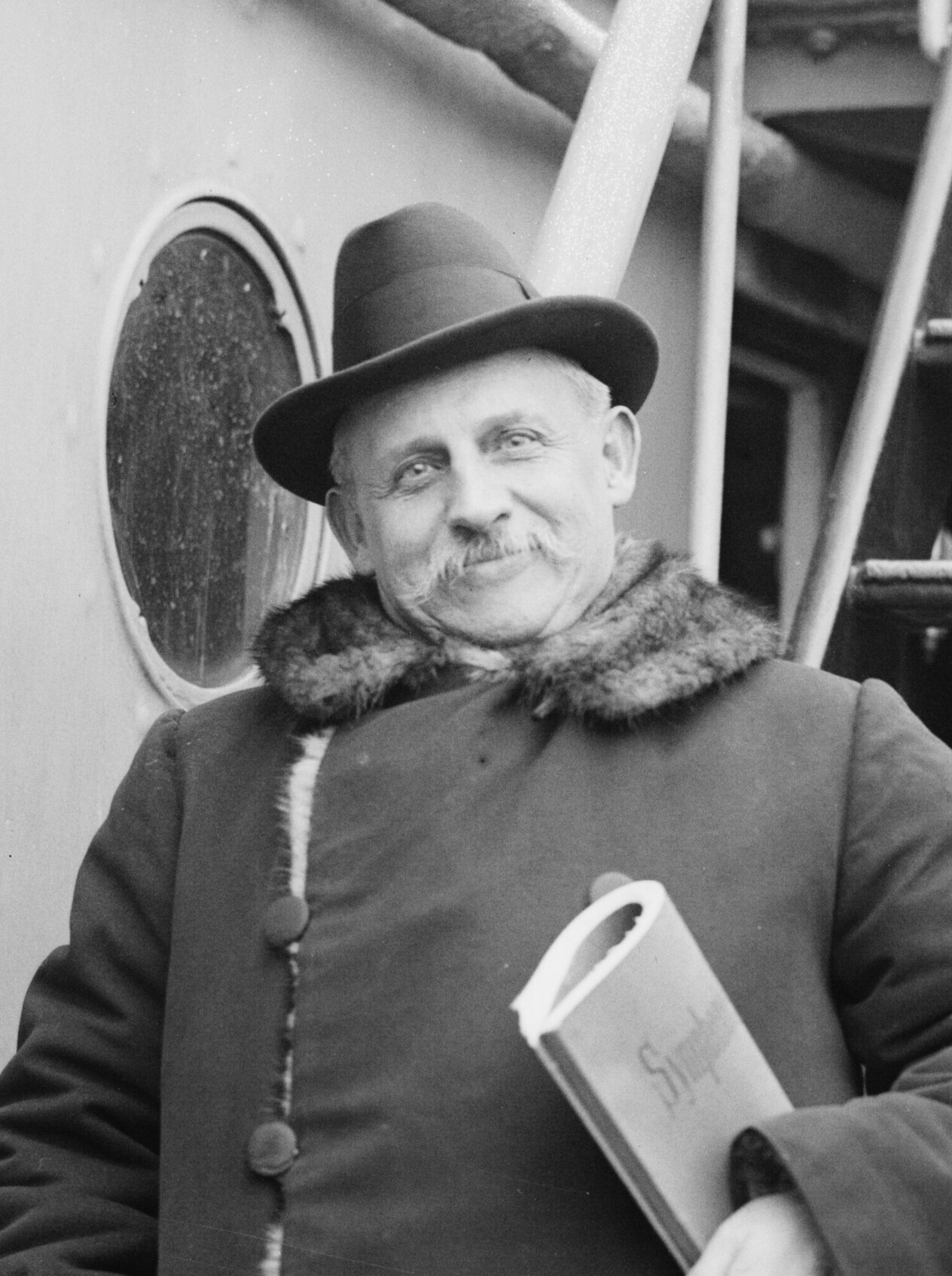
d'Harcourt in 1917

Anne Marie Eugène d'Harcourt, Comte d'Harcourt (May 20, 1859 – March 7, 1918), was a French conductor and composer.

== Biography ==
He was born on May 20, 1859, in Paris, France, to Bruno Jean Marie d'Harcourt and Juliette d'Andigne de la Chasse. He attended the Paris Conservatoire in 1880. He was an organ student of Eugène Gigout.

He completed his mandatory military service and on the advice of Charles Lamoureux went to Berlin, Germany, where he became a pupil of Woldemar Bargiel. He returned to Paris and founded the "Concerts Eclectiques Populaires" in 1892.

He married Armande de Pierre de Bernis on July 23, 1898, in Marseille, France. They had as their son, Bruno, Count of Harcourt.

In 1900 he organized a society to perform oratorios in the Église Saint-Eustache, Paris, and he directed "The Messiah" by Handel, Berlioz's Requiem, St Matthew Passion by Bach and for the first time anywhere, Massenet's oratorio La Terre Promise. In 1904 he was sent by the French Government on a musical mission to various European countries to access the current state of music.

He died on March 7, 1918, in Locarno, Switzerland.
