= Princess Isabelle of Orléans (1878–1961) =

French princess and Duchess of Guise (1878-1961)

Princess Isabelle
- Duchess of Guise
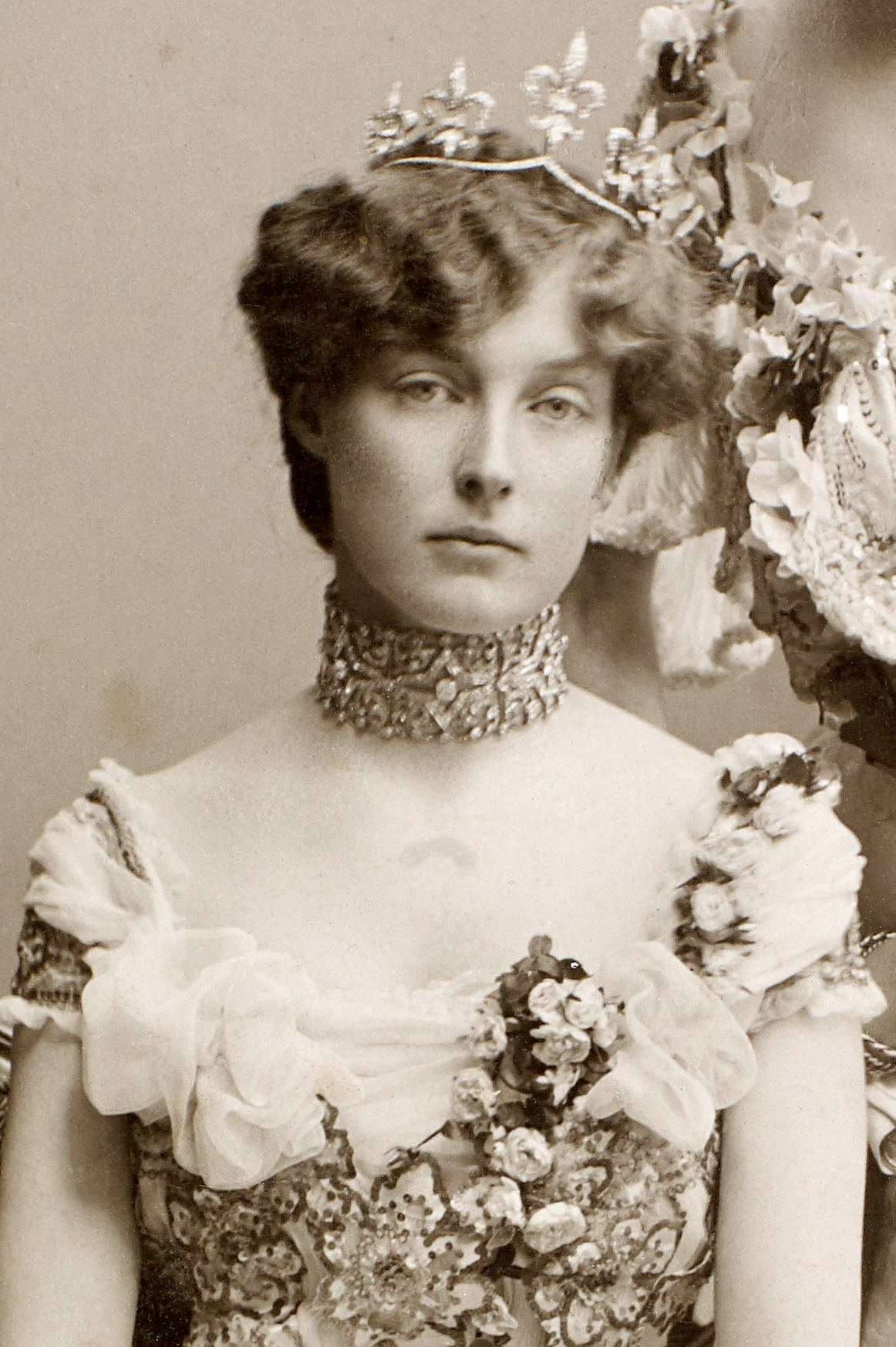
- Isabelle, c. 1902

Consort of the Orléanist pretender to the French throne
- Pretendence: 28 March 1926 – 25 August 1940
- Born: 7 May 1878; Eu, France
- Died: 21 April 1961 (aged 82); Larache, Morocco
- Burial: Chapelle royale de Dreux
- Spouse: Prince Jean, Duke of Guise (m. 1899; died 1940)
- Issue: Princess Isabelle, Countess of Harcourt; Françoise, Princess Christopher of Greece and Denmark; Princess Anne, Duchess of Aosta; Prince Henri, Count of Paris
Names
- Isabelle Marie Laure Mercédès Ferdinande d'Orléans
- House: Orléans
- Father: Prince Philippe, Count of Paris
- Mother: Infanta Maria Isabel of Spain
- Coat of arms Princess Isabelle of Orléans

Princess Isabelle of Orléans (French: Isabelle Marie Laure Mercédès Ferdinande; 7 May 1878 – 21 April 1961) was a member of the French Orleanist royal family and by marriage Duchess of Guise.

== Biography ==
=== Early life ===
Isabelle was born at the Château d'Eu in Eu, France, the third daughter and fifth (fourth surviving) child of Prince Philippe, Count of Paris and Infanta Maria Isabel of Spain. In 1886, when she was eight years old, a law was promulgated by the Third Republic that effectively exiled all dynasties who formerly ruled France, whereupon she and her family moved to England.

=== Marriage and issue ===
As a young woman, Isabelle had many suitors, chief among them being the future King Albert I of Belgium. Albert, however, was forced to end the courtship under pressure from his uncle King Leopold II, who feared that a marriage to the daughter of an exiled pretender to the French throne would result in backlash from the republican government in Paris.

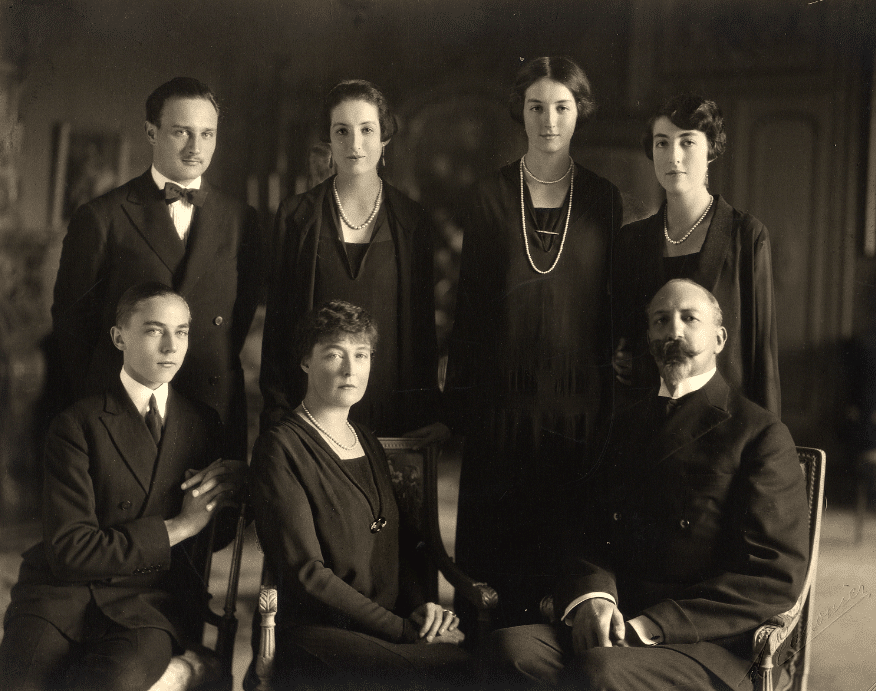
Isabelle with her family, 1925.

On 30 October 1899, Isabelle married her first cousin Prince Jean, Duke of Guise. Jean was the son of prince Robert, Duke of Chartres and Françoise d'Orléans. Upon the death of her brother, Philippe of Orléans, Duke of Orléans, claimant to the throne of France as "Philip VIII", the Duke of Guise became, at least for his Orleanist supporters, titular king of France as "Jean III". The title was disputed by members of the Spanish Anjou branch of the family, descended from Louis XIV.

The couple had four children:

- Princess Isabelle of Orléans (27 November 1900 – 12 February 1983). First married in 1923 to Bruno, Count of Harcourt (1899–1930) and then to Prince Pierre Murat in 1934.
- Princess Françoise of Orléans (25 December 1902 – 25 February 1953). Married to Prince Christopher of Greece and Denmark in 1929. He was the son of King George I of Greece and Olga, Queen of Greece. They were parents of Prince Michael of Greece and Denmark.
- Princess Anne of Orléans (5 August 1906 – 19 March 1986). She married Prince Amedeo of Savoy, 3rd Duke of Aosta in 1927.
- Henri, Count of Paris (5 July 1908 – 19 June 1999). He married Princess Isabelle of Orléans-Braganza in 1931.

Princess Isabelle died in Larache, Morocco, on 21 April 1962 at age 82.

== Foreign dynastic decorations ==
- Grand Cross of Honour and Devotion of the Sovereign Military Order of Malta (1926).
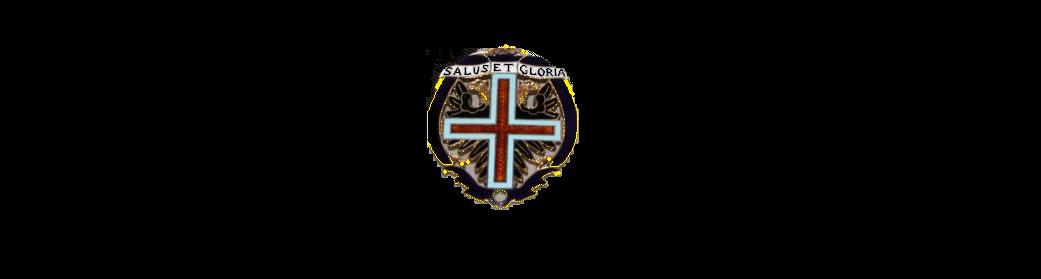
- Dames of the Order of the Starry Cross.
- Dames 943 of the Order of Queen Maria Luisa (24 October 1899).
- Grand Cross with White Distinctive of the Civil Order of Beneficence (20 October 1927)
- Grand Cross of the Order of the Redeemer.
- Honorary Grand Cross of the Order of Saint Isabel .

== Ancestry ==
Ancestors of Princess Isabelle of Orléans (1878–1961)

8. Louis Philippe I, King of the French
4. Prince Ferdinand Philippe, Duke of Orléans
9. Princess Marie Amélie of Naples and Sicily
2. Prince Philippe, Count of Paris
10. Frederick Louis, Hereditary Grand Duke of Mecklenburg-Schwerin
5. Duchess Helene of Mecklenburg-Schwerin
11. Princess Caroline Louise of Saxe-Weimar-Eisenach
1. Princess Isabelle of Orléans
12. Louis Philippe I, King of the French (= 8)
6. Prince Antoine, Duke of Montpensier
13. Princess Marie Amélie of Naples and Sicily (= 9)
3. Princess Marie Isabelle of Orléans
14. Ferdinand VII of Spain
7. Infanta Luisa Fernanda of Spain
15. Princess Maria Christina of the Two Sicilies

Princess Isabelle of Orléans (1878–1961) House of Orléans Cadet branch of the House of Bourbon Born: 7 May 1878 Died: 21 April 1961
Titles in pretence
Preceded by Archduchess Maria Dorothea of Austria	— TITULAR — Queen consort of France; 28 March 1926 – 25 August 1940	Succeeded by Isabelle of Orléans-Braganza
