= Philomena, Countess of Paris =

Aristocrat of Spanish and Austrian descent (born 1977)

Philomena de Tornos y Steinhart
- Countess of Paris
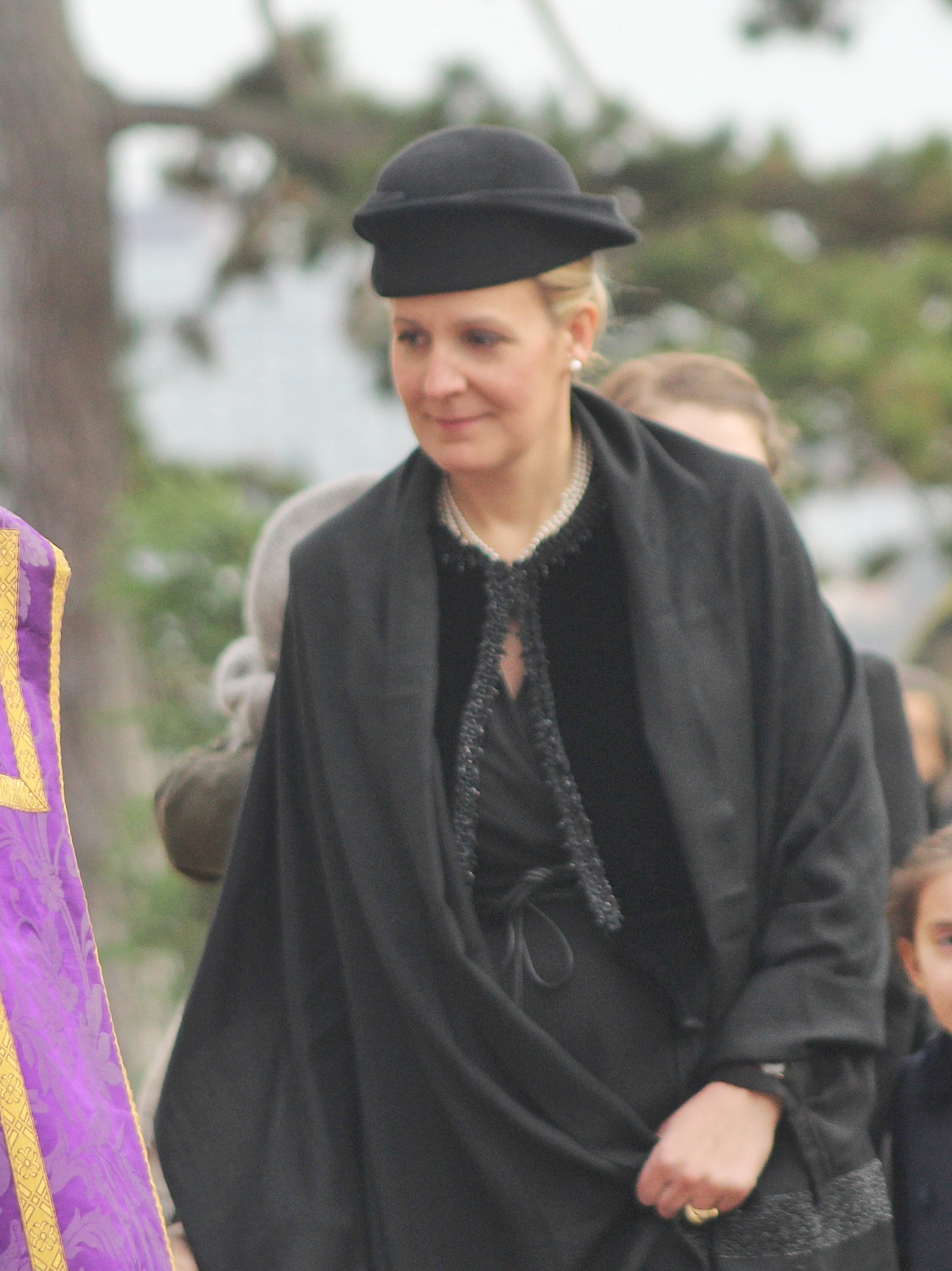
- The Countess of Paris in 2019

Consort of the Orléanist pretender to the French throne
- Pretendence: 21 January 2019 – present
- Born: Maria Philomena Magdalena Juliana Johanna de Tornos y Steinhart; 19 June 1977 (age 49); Vienna, Austria
- Spouse: Prince Jean, Count of Paris (m. 2009)
- Issue: Prince Gaston, Dauphin of France; Princess Antoinette; Princess Louise-Marguerite; Prince Joseph; Princess Jacinthe; Prince Alphonse
- House: de Tornos
- Father: Alfonso de Tornos y Zubiría
- Mother: Maria Antonia von Steinhart
- Religion: Catholicism

Arms of alliance of Philomena de Tornos y Steinhart and her husband Prince Jean, Duke of Vendôme

Philomena de Tornos y Steinhart (born 19 June 1977) is an aristocrat of Hispanic-Austrian descent. Philomena, who uses the courtesy title of "Countess of Paris", is the wife of Jean d'Orléans, Count of Paris, Orléanist claimant to the defunct throne of France and head of the House of Orléans, a cadet branch of the House of Bourbon.

== Early life and ancestry ==
Philomena is the elder daughter and eldest child of Don Alfonso de Tornos y Zubiría (b. Getxo, 13 October 1937 - d. Paris, 5 April 2013), of Basque noble ancestry, and his wife (married in Vienna, 18 September 1976), Maria Antonia Anna Zdenka, Edle von Steinhart (b. 1944), of Austrian noble ancestry. Philomena has two younger siblings: a sister named Maria Magdalena, Countess d'Andlau de Cleron d'Haussonville (b. 1980) and a brother, David de Tornos y Steinhart (b. 1982).

Her paternal grandparents are Don Juan de Tornos y Espelíus (1905-1985) (former head of the personal secretariat of Infante Juan, Count of Barcelona, grandfather of the current King of Spain) and his wife, Doña María del Carmen Zubiría y Calbetón (1906-1981), daughter of Don Luis de Zubiria y Urizar, 2nd Marquis de Yanduri (1876-1944), members of the Spanish nobility.

Her maternal grandparents were Dr. Ferdinand, Edler von Steinhart (1910–1998) and his wife (married September 1939) Gabriele Felicitas Murad von Werner (1913–1994), paternal granddaughter of Murad Effendi, Ottoman diplomat who was born as Franz Xaver Karl Georg Arthur von Werner, both members of the Austrian nobility.

== Life and education ==
She spent part of her youth in the Auvergne and studied at the Lycée Maritime in Ciboure. Philomena, her husband Jean and their children lived at their family estate in Dreux, France, but in 2020 they moved to live in Montréal de l'Aude.

== Marriage and children ==
Philomena married Prince Jean, Duke of Vendôme in a civil service on 19 March 2009 in Paris, conducted by Mayor Rachida Dati. The religious wedding was held on 2 May 2009 at the Cathédrale Notre-Dame at Senlis, with a reception at the Château de Chantilly. The bride wore a gown by Christian Lacroix and a jacket embroidered by Maison Lesage.

The pair are distantly related, as both are descendants of Count Jaroslav Bořita of Martinice by his first wife, Baroness Maria Eusebia von Sternberg (1584–1634), members of an ancient Bohemian nobility.

The couple have six children:

- Prince Gaston Louis Antoine Marie d'Orléans (born 19 November 2009 in Paris), became Dauphin of France succeeding his father on 21 January 2019;
- Princess Antoinette Léopoldine Jeanne Marie d'Orléans (born 28 January 2012 in Vienna);
- Princess Louise-Marguerite Éléonore Marie d'Orléans (born 30 July 2014 in Poissy);
- Prince Joseph Gabriel David Marie d'Orléans (born 2 June 2016 in Dreux);
- Princess Jacinthe Élisabeth-Charlotte Marie d’Orléans (born 9 October 2018 in Dreux).
- Prince Alphonse Charles François Marie d'Orléans (born 31 December 2023 in Carcassonne).

== Dynastic honours ==
- (Kingdom of Portugal) Portuguese Royal Family: Dame Grand Cross of the Royal Order of Saint Isabel (27 October 2012, installed 6 November 2012)
- (Kingdom of the Two Sicilies) Two Sicilian Royal Family: Bailiff Dame Grand Cross of Justice of the Sacred Military Constantinian Order of Saint George (19 March 2019, installed 13 May 2019)

== See also ==
- Orléanist

== Bibliography ==
- Opfell, Olga S. (2001). "H.R.H. Henri, Count of Paris: Royal House of France House of Bourbon-Orleans". Royalty Who Wait: The 21 Heads of Formerly Regnant Houses of Europe. Jefferson, North Carolina and London: McFarland. pp. 21–32. ISBN 0-7864-0901-0.

Philomena, Countess of Paris Born: 19 June 1977
Titles in pretence
Preceded by Micaëla Cousiño Quiñones de León	— TITULAR — Queen consort of France; 21 January 2019 – present Reason for succession failure: Orléans monarchy deposed in 1848	Incumbent
