= Orléanist =

French monarchist faction in support of the House of Orléans

Coat of arms of the House of Orléans at the start of the July Monarchy

Orléanist (French: Orléaniste) was a 19th-century French political label originally used by those who supported a constitutional monarchy expressed by the House of Orléans. Due to the radical political changes that occurred during that century in France, four different phases of Orléanism can be identified:

- The "pure" Orléanism: constituted by those who supported the constitutional reign of Louis Philippe I (1830–1848) after the 1830 July Revolution, and who showed liberal and moderate ideas.
- The "fusionist" (or "unionist") Orléanism: the movement formed by pure Orléanists and by those Legitimists who after the childless death of Henri, Count of Chambord in 1883 endorsed Philippe, Count of Paris, grandson of Louis Philippe, as his successor. The fusion drove the Orleanist movement to more conservative stances, emphasising French nationality (rejecting claims to France of the Spanish Bourbons on account of their "foreignness") and Catholicism.
- The "progressive" Orléanism: the majority of "fusionists" who, after the decline of monarchist sentiment in the 1890s, joined into moderate republicans, who showed progressive and secular-minded goals, or into Catholic rally, like the Liberal Action.
- Contemporary Orléanism. The party Action Française embraced and still does advocate for its own variant of Orléanism which rejects the economic liberal policies of "pure" Orléanism and supports Integralism.

Orleanism was opposed by the two other monarchist trends: the more conservative Legitimism that was loyal to the eldest branch of the House of Bourbon after 1830, and the Bonapartism that supported Napoleon's legacy and heirs.

== Under the July Monarchy ==
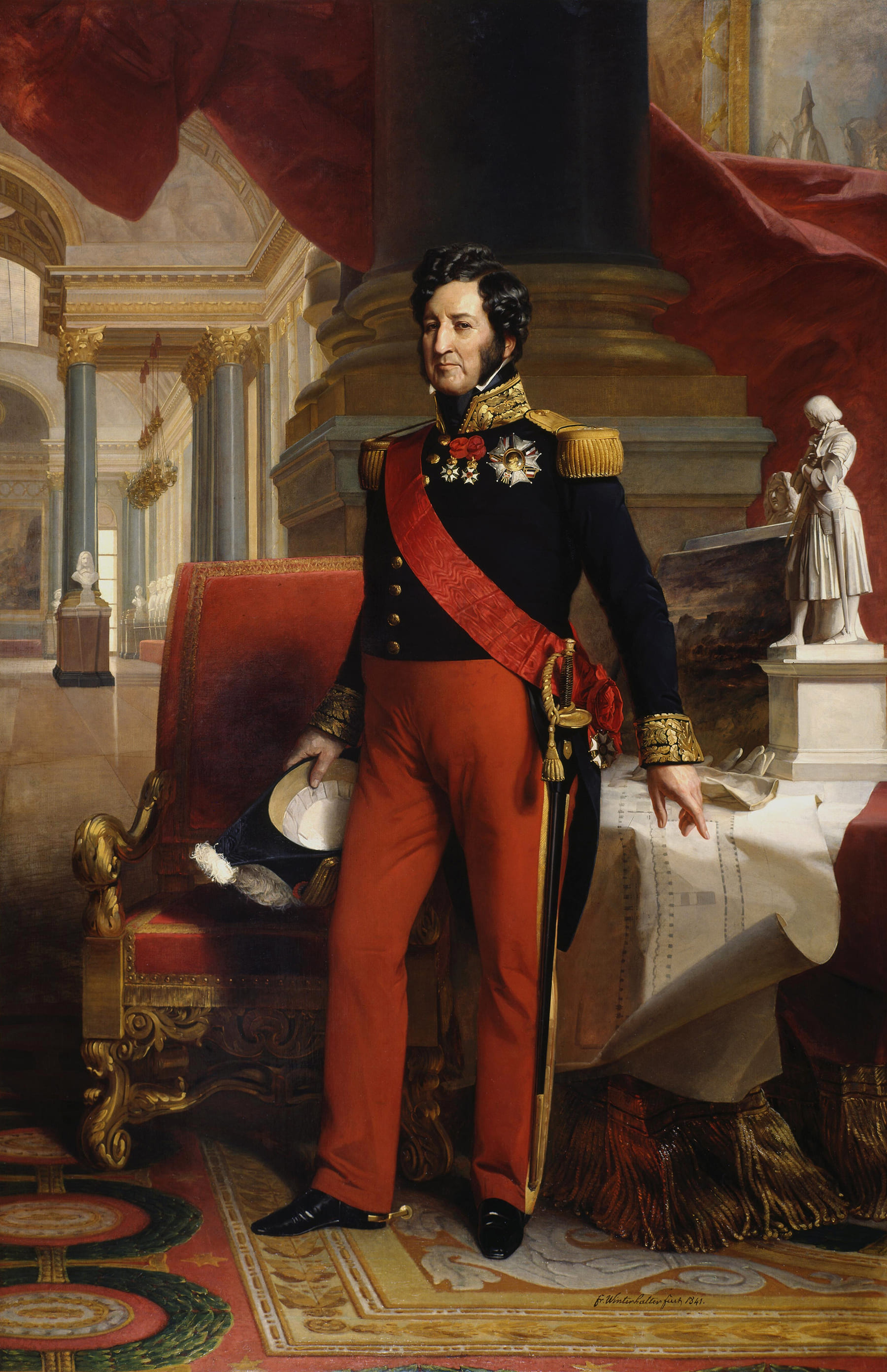
Louis Philippe portrait by Winterhalter

On 26 July 1830, the revolution of the so-called Three Glorious Days (or July Revolution) erupted due to the authoritarian and anti-Gallican tendencies showed by Charles X and his Prime Minister Jules de Polignac, expressed by the recently approved Saint-Cloud Ordinances. Despite the abdication of Charles X and the Dauphin Louis in favor to Charles X's grandson Henri, Duke of Bordeaux, on 2 August 1830, only seven days later Louis Philippe I, still Duke of Orléans, was elected by the Chamber of Deputies as new "King of the French". The enthronement of Louis Philippe was strongly wanted by Doctrinaires, the liberal opposition to Charles X's ministries, under the concept "nationalize the monarchy and royalize France". On 14 August 1830, the Chamber approved a new Constitution, which became the de facto political manifesto for the Orléanists, containing the basis for a constitutional monarchy with a central Parliament. The Orléanism, became the dominant tendency within political life, easily divided inside the Chamber of Deputies between the centre-left of Adolphe Thiers and the centre-right of François Guizot. Louis Philippe showed himself more aligned with Guizot, entrusted to the higher offices of government, and rapidly became associated with the rising "new men" of the banks, industries and finance, gaining the epithet of "Roi bourgeois". In the early 1840s, Louis Philippe's popularity decreased, due to his strong connection to upper classes and repression against workers' strikes, and showed few concerns for his weakened position, leading the writer Victor Hugo to describe him as "a man with many little qualities". The Orléanist regime finally fell in 1848, when a revolution erupted and on 24 February Louis Philippe abdicated in favor to his grandson Philippe, Count of Paris, under regency of his mother Helene, Duchess of Orléans, who was quickly ousted out from the Chamber of Deputies during the regency's formalization, who was interrupted by republican deputies who instead proclaimed the Second Republic.

After 18 years of reign, Louis Philippe left the Orléanist base well-defined inside the magistrature, the press, universities and academies, especially the Académie française. However, also some great aristocratic families joined the court, like the Dukes of Broglie, as well former Bonapartist officers like the Marshal Soult and Édouard Mortier. This establishment constituted the majority of the Party of Order, led by Thiers, who represented the conservatives and monarchists under the Second Republic.

== Under the Third Republic ==
=== Fusion and restoration project ===
Electoral results
Year	No. of overall votes	% of overall vote	No. of overall seats won
National Assembly
1871	Unknown (1st)	33.5%	214 / 638
Chamber of Deputies
1876	554,117 (6th)	7.5%	40 / 533
1877	169,834 (5th)	2.1%	11 / 521
1881	552,971 (5th)	7.7%	42 / 545
1885	991,188 (4th)	12.2%	73 / 584
1889	994,173 (4th)	12.5%	72 / 576
1893	816,789 (3rd)	10.5%	63 / 574
1898	607,960 (5th)	7.5%	44 / 585

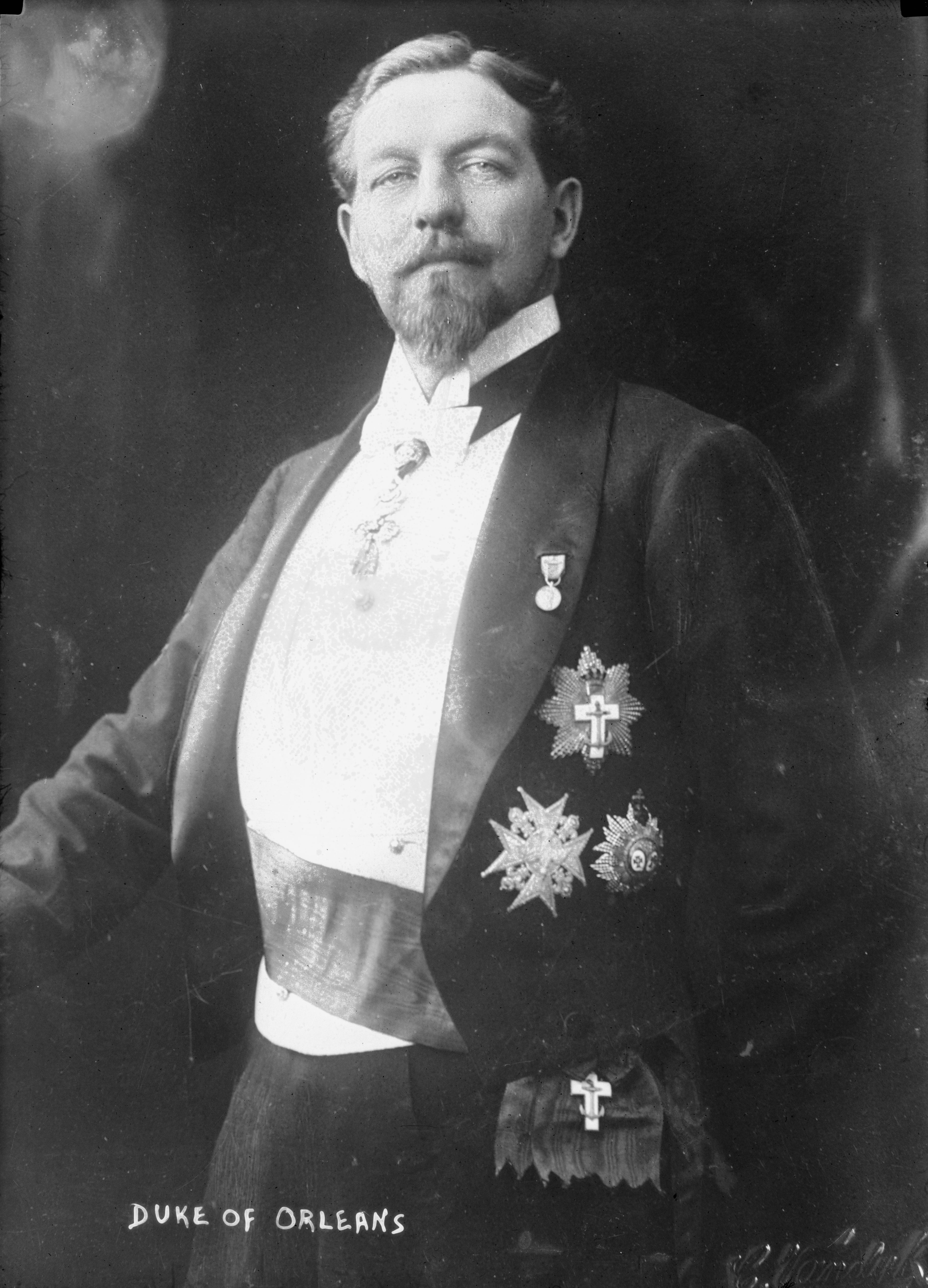
The Duke of Orléans, son of the Count of Paris, espoused conservative stances, also reviving the Order of the Holy Spirit to support his claim.

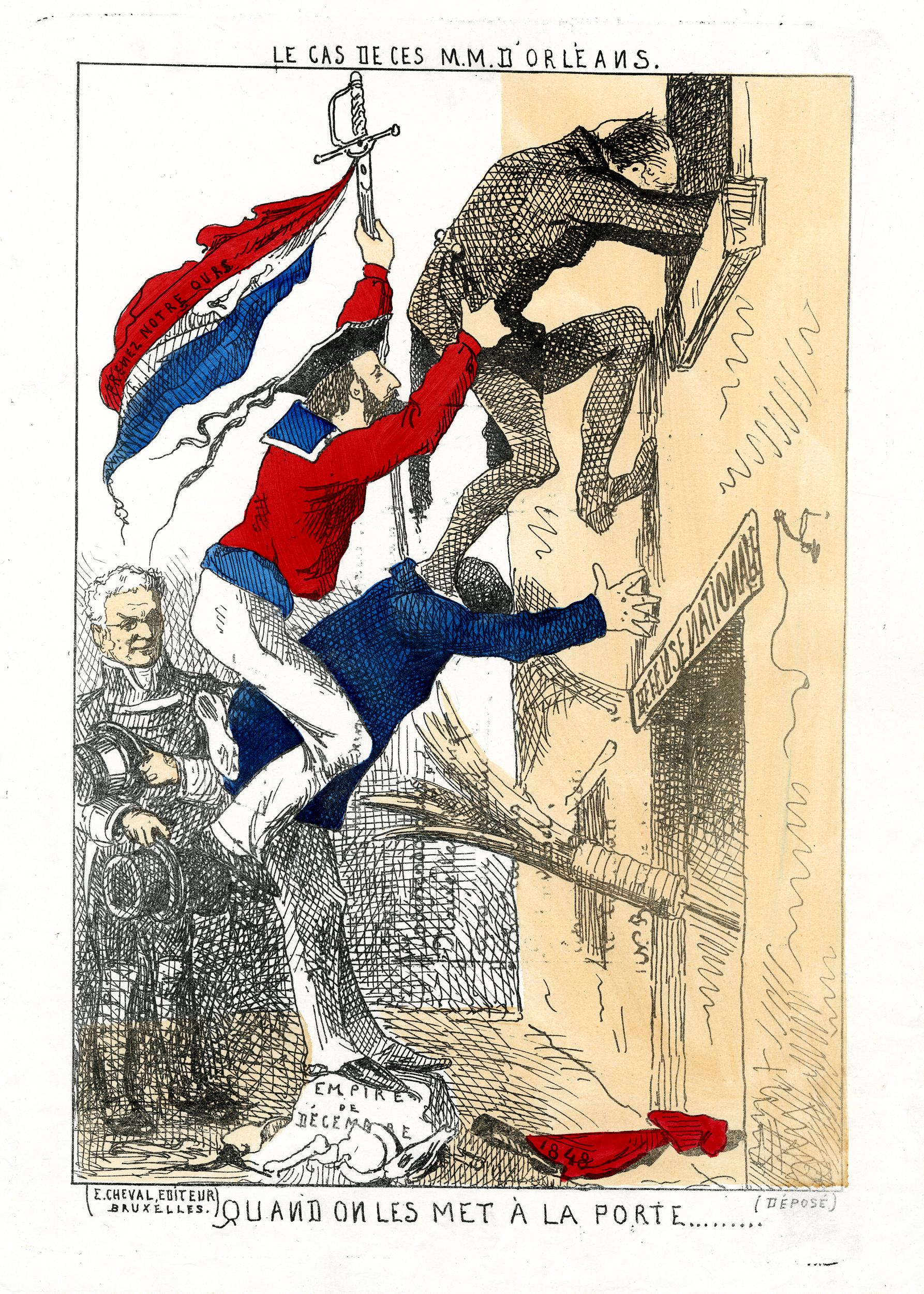
Satirical cartoon of 1871: Orléanists stand on the ruined December Empire and attempt to enter the "Défense Nationale" building, while Adolphe Thiers looks on.

Orléanism revived after the French defeat in the Franco-Prussian War of 1870-1871 which caused the fall of the Second Empire which had succeeded to the Second Republic under Emperor Napoleon III, the former president of France who had been enthroned after the coup d'état of 1851. The Second Empire was succeeded itself officially in 1871 by the Third Republic. A National Assembly, composed by 638 on 778 seats, was formed and new elections were called for the 8 February of the same year, which resulted in a victory for the monarchist right: 396 seats won, divided to 214 Orléanists and 182 Legitimists, nicknamed "cavalrymen". Initially divided about the dynastic issue, the Orléanists found a compromise with the Legitimists, supporting the rights of Henri, Count of Chambord (former Duke of Bordeaux, currently childless) in return of the recognition of the Count of Paris as his heir, echoing an 1862 statement of Chambord. Although Chambord never mentioned the Count of Paris as his heir, probably fearing the defection of his ultraconservative supporters, the informal agreement sanctioned the "fusion" of Legitimists and Orléanists, who quite easily formed a conservative coalition. The monarchist majority, led by the Duke of Aumale (son of Louis Philippe), and the centre-left endorsed the centre-right candidate Thiers as president of the Republic, but due to the continued arguments between Legitimists and Orléanists and the memory of the dynastic divisions of the past 40 years, Thiers moved to support a "conservative republic" instead of a divided monarchy.

Due to Chambord's dislike of Aumale, the "fusionists" rapidly passed under the leadership of the Duke of Broglie, who in 1873 successfully managed the election of President Patrice de MacMahon, former general and national hero who showed Legitimist sympathies, considering him as a kind of "lieutenant-general of the kingdom" before the fully restoration of Chambord on the throne. Broglie was shortly after awarded with the premiership by MacMahon, supported by monarchists and the centre-right. Restoration appeared imminent when a parliamentary commission was established in October 1873 to adopt a monarchist constitution. But in the same month the majority was weakened by the refusal of Chambord to accept the French Tricolour, used since 1830, preferring instead the return of the royal white flag, symbol of the Ancien Régime. The question was apparently resolved with a compromise between Broglie and Chambord: the last will accept the tricolour flag while a future agreement about a new flag will be considered. In October the majority was shocked when the centre-right representative Charles Savary rashly misinformed the press of Chambord's full acceptance of the tricolour flag,. The pretender had to harshly clarify his position, causing the left of the centre-right, Orléanists disappointment and the dissolution of the "restoration" commission on 31 October 1873. A last attempt by Chambord was made on 12 November, when he asked President MacMahon via the Duke of Blacas to join with him into the National Assembly and spoke toward the representatives, hoping to convince them to restore the monarchy, but MacMahon refused due to his institutional position, toward he was formally even if not ideologically attached, causing the project's failure. Due to the impossibility to restore the monarchy in a short time, the Orléanists waited the death of the sickly Chambord, occurred in 1883, but by that time, enthusiasm for a monarchy had faded, and as a result the Count of Paris was never offered the French throne.

The monarchists, however, still controlled the National Assembly, and under MacMahon's partisan presidency they launched the so-called "moral order government", in reference to the Paris Commune, whose political and social innovations were viewed as morally degenerate by large conservative segments of the French population. In February 1875, a series of parliamentary acts established the constitutional laws of the new republic. At its head was a President of the Republic. A two-chamber parliament consisting of a directly elected Chamber of Deputies and an indirectly-elected Senate was created, along with a ministry under the President of the council (prime minister), who was nominally answerable to both the President of the Republic and the legislature. Throughout the 1870s, the issue of whether a monarchy should replace the republic dominated public debate. On 16 May 1877, with public opinion swinging heavily in favour of a republic after the election of March, President MacMahon made one last desperate attempt to salvage the monarchical cause by dismissing the "conservative republican" prime minister Jules Simon and appointing the Duke of Broglie to office. He then dissolved parliament and called a general election for the following October. If his hope had been to halt the move towards republicanism, it backfired spectacularly, with the president being accused of having staged a constitutional coup d'état known as "16 May Crisis" after the date on which it happened. Republicans returned triumphantly after the October elections for the Chamber of Deputies. The crisis ultimately sealed the defeat of the royalist movement, and was instrumental in creating the conditions of the longevity of the Third Republic: in January 1879 the Republicans gained control of the Senate, formerly monopolized by monarchists. MacMahon himself resigned on 30 January 1879, leaving a seriously weakened presidency in the hands of Jules Grévy, leader of the Republican Left.

The end of the presidency of MacMahon and the Senate's loss caused the end of the monarchist bloc. Although there were Orléanist deputies in the Chamber for all the 19th century, they were only a minority. At the end, many monarchists accepted the republic, moving toward the centre. Some Orléanists, especially from their bourgeoise core base, accepted the republic even since the 1870s, like Thiers and press baron Émile de Girardin. In 1892, after Pope Leo XIII's approval to the Third Republic, breaking the historical alliance between Church and Crown, some monarchists led by Orléanist Jacques Piou and Legitimist Albert de Mun formed the group of the "ralliés" ("supporters"), that in 1901 constituted the base of the first Christian Democratic party in France, the Liberal Action, while many other royalists were still attached to the Crown.

=== Association with the far-right ===
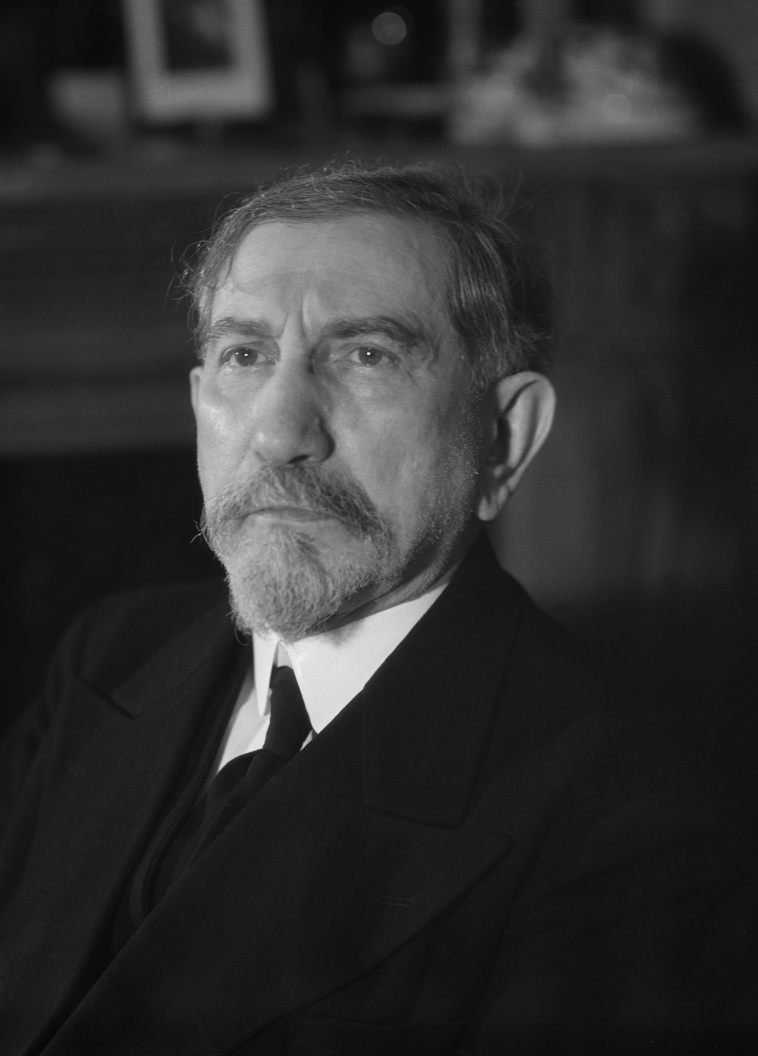
Charles Maurras in 1937

The elections of 1898 confirmed the exclusion of the monarchists from any possible government. However, 4 years earlier, the Dreyfus affair shook public opinion, dividing the republican camp: socialists, radicals and liberals defended the innocence of Dreyfus, while other republicans joined the nationalists and monarchists against Dreyfus. The election also introduced 10 overtly anti-Semitic representatives, led by Édouard Drumont. The following year, on 20 June 1899, the academic Henri Vaugeois and journalist Maurice Pujo founded the nationalist association Action française, initially absent of any specific ideology. However, the Action was joined by many Catholics and monarchists who were anti-Dreyfus, contributing to the move of the association toward the right. Particularly, the adhesion of Charles Maurras, considered a "pragmatic" anti-Dreyfusard rather than a true anti-Semite, contributed to the creation of the ideology of the Action, which rapidly became the main monarchist group. Maurras, despite becoming the movement's ideologist, supported not a classical monarchy on religious term (divine right) but a positivist one, stating that a monarchy would grant more order and stability than a parliamentary republic. The largest group of French monarchists, after the death of Chambord in 1883, endorsed the Count of Paris until his death in 1894, recognizing the claim of his son Philippe, Duke of Orléans, who was also supported by the Action. However, monarchism inside the Action was always integrated secondary to its semi-official ideology of "integral nationalism" theorized by Maurras, and many Action activists were still republicans, like the founder Vaugeois. The movement grew to be one of the largest organizations in France, but in 1926 a condemnation from Pope Pius XI against the Action caused the defection of many Catholic sympathizers. The Pope judged that it was folly for the French Church to continue to tie its fortunes to the unlikely dream of a monarchist restoration, and distrusted the movement's tendency to defend the Catholic religion in merely utilitarian and nationalistic terms, and the Action Française never recovered from the condemnation.

By 1934, the Action was still a considerable force, with over 60,000 members across France. In that year, they joined other far-right leagues on 6 February demonstrations against political corruption and the Parliament, causing the resignation of Prime Minister Édouard Daladier the day after and provoking fear of a nationalist coup d'état. The papal condemnation, the aggressive tactics, and Maurras's disrespectful attitude toward constitutional monarchists finally ended the organization as a major power. The Orléanist pretender Jean, Duke of Guise, who in 1937 broken ties with the Action, also lost many supporters. From this moment, Orléanism ceased to be associated with the Action or the far-right. Instead, the Duke of Guise's son and heir Henri, Count of Paris, launched his own magazine Courier Royale and secretly dealt with anti-fascist conservative General La Rocque, leader of the French Social Party, about the possibility of a restoration.

== Hope during the Fourth Republic ==
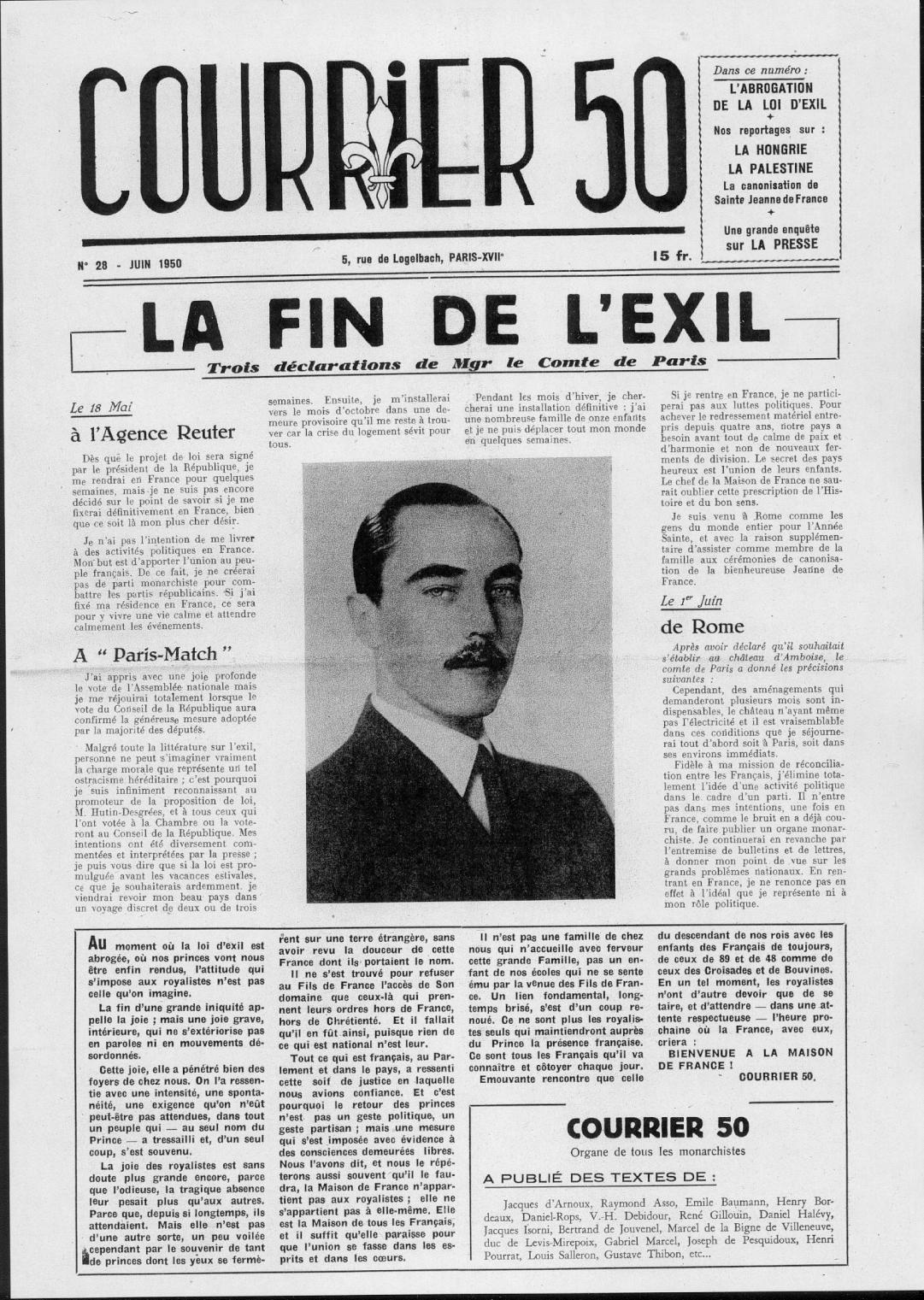
Front page of Courrier 50 announcing the end of the exile of Orléans

In 1946, the Count of Paris (who succeeded his father in 1940) moved to Portugal due to the ban on former royals still present in France. As a result of the unstable situation of the Fourth Republic, characterized like its predecessor by short governments and a high number of political parties, the Count of Paris made a serious attempt to restore the French monarchy. He endorsed the Christian Democratic Popular Republican Movement (MPR), and formed a kind of political committee composed of the academics Bertrand de Jouvenel, Gustave Thibon and Michel de Saint Pierre, publishing on 5 February 1948 the manifesto Esquisse d'une constitution monarchique et démocratique, that promoted the idea of a constitutional monarchy. Thanks to the MPR deputy Paul Hutin-Desgrées (co-founder of Ouest-France), the exile law was abrogated on 24 June 1950, permitting the return of the Count of Paris to the capital, where he met with President Vincent Auriol. The count and his family made their home in the Parisian suburbs of Louveciennes, and quickly became media darlings. Orléans frequently went to parties and meetings which were attended by prominent French politicians of the Fourth Republic, such as Antoine Pinay, Jacques Soustelle, Pierre Mendès France and Maurice Schumann. Through his newsletter Courier 50, the Count of Paris expressed support for the policies of Mendès France, like the peace in Indochina, the refusal of a US-controlled European Defence Community (EDC) and decolonization of French Africa.

Orléans' relationship with Charles de Gaulle was also promising, as the general and the pretender had similar political views and were both devout Roman Catholics. When De Gaulle became prime minister in 1958, it was expected by the Count of Paris that the general would move to restore the French monarchy, but instead De Gaulle preferred to strengthen the republican institutions, eventually becoming the driving force behind the establishment of the present-day Fifth Republic. De Gaulle was elected president of the new government in 1959, and seems to have promised the Count of Paris that he wouldn't run again in the election of 1965, instead supporting the candidacy of the pretender that would promote a campaign to transform the republic into a constitutional monarchy. However, in 1963 De Gaulle confided to his minister Alain Peyrefitte that, despite his respect and esteem for the Count of Paris, he never considered him to be his successor as the head of state, stating that the idea of a monarchy was incompatible with the modern world. Disappointed by the false hopes and unfulfilled promises, the Count of Paris retired from French political life in 1967, ending also the publications of his newsletter.

== Principles of succession ==
Orléanist pretenders from 1883 to the present follow these principles:

- The Crown passes by primogeniture to males born in the male line of Hugh Capet.
- Only children born of legal marriages conforming with the canon law of the Catholic Church are dynasts.
- The Sovereign or Head of the House can neither abdicate nor alter the line of succession. The Princes of the blood likewise cannot personally renounce their succession rights. Those rights can however be permanently lost under specific circumstances (see below).
- The throne is never vacant; upon the death of the Sovereign or Head of the House, the first in line automatically succeeds, regardless of any coronation or whether actually reigning.
- The Sovereign or Head of the House must be Catholic.
- The Sovereign or Head of the House must be both French and born of an unbroken line of French dynasts descending from Hugh Capet. Any prince of the blood that leaves France to claim a foreign throne or a position subject to which permanently loses his rights of succession, as do his descendants. It is this rule that separates the Orléanist rule from the Legitimist one.

== List of claimants to the French throne since 1848 ==
Claimant	Portrait	Birth	Marriages	Death
Philippe, Count of Paris (Louis Philippe II); 1848–1873; Orléanist pretender (Philippe VII); 1883–1894; Unionist pretender		24 August 1838; Paris; Son of Prince Ferdinand Philippe, Duke of Orléans and Duchess Helen of Mecklenburg-Schwerin	Princess Marie Isabelle of Orléans; 30 May 1864; 8 children	8 September 1894; Stowe House; Aged 56
Philippe, Duke of Orléans (Philippe VIII); 1894–1926		24 August 1869; York House, Twickenham; Son of Philippe, Count of Paris and Princess Marie Isabelle of Orléans	Archduchess Maria Dorothea of Austria; 5 November 1896; No children	28 March 1926; Palermo; Aged 56
Jean, Duke of Guise (Jean III); 1926–1940		4 September 1874; France; Son of Robert, Duke of Chartres and Marie-Françoise of Orléans	Isabelle of Orléans; 30 October 1899; 4 children	25 August 1940; Larache, Spanish Morocco; Aged 65
Henri, Count of Paris (Henri VI); 1940–1999		5 July 1908; Chateau de Nouvion-en-Thiérache, Aisne, France; Son of Jean, Duke of Guise and Isabelle of Orléans	Isabelle of Orléans-Braganza; 8 April 1931; 11 children	19 June 1999; Chérisy; Aged 90
Henri d'Orléans, Count of Paris (Henri VII); 1999–2019		June 14, 1933; Woluwe-Saint-Pierre, Belgium; Son of Henri, Count of Paris and Isabelle of Orléans-Braganza	Marie Thérèse, Duchess of Montpensier; 5 July 1957; 5 children Micaëla Cousiño Quiñones de León; 31 October 1984 (Civil); 26 September 2009 (Religious)	21 January 2019; Paris; Aged 85
Jean, Count of Paris (Jean IV); 2019–present		May 19, 1965; Boulogne-Billancourt, Paris, France; Son of Henri, Count of Paris and Marie-Thérèse of Württemberg	Philomena de Tornos Steinhart; 19 March 2009; 5 children	

== Orléanist political parties ==
- Doctrinaires (1815–48)
- Resistance Party (1832–48)
- Movement Party (1831–48)
- Party of Order (1848–52)
- Action Française (1899–present)

== Legacy ==
The Orléanist party, despite the different regimes, maintained its bourgeois platform, constituted by those academics, journalists and financiers who backed Louis Philippe during his reign, and was intended as the liberal centre of politics, far from reactionary Legitimists and revolutionary republicans. However, for all the span of Louis Philippe's reign, the Orléanists were not a homogeneous party, but simply the majority who supported the constitutional system. It was only after the establishment of the Second French Republic in 1848 and the division inside right-wing factions over the monarchy that the Orléanist party found unity, supporting a parliamentary system instead of an executive one.

In the early 20th century, the majority of Orléanists accepted the republican institutions, approving the parliamentary system and pro-business policy realized by the republican majority, who reflected the historical Orléanist purposes. French historian René Rémond included the presidency of Valéry Giscard d'Estaing as part of the Orléanist tradition, due to his liberal views and equidistance from the nationalist right (descending from Bonapartism) and the conservative right (from Legitimism). The term "Orléanist parliamentarism" was also used by jurist and sociologist Maurice Duverger to define the form of government of the Fifth Republic, which presents a parliamentary system with a powerful head of state.

In 1974, before the presidential election, the New Royal Action (NAR), born by a moderate faction spilled from the Action française, endorsed Bertrand Renouvin for the presidency, with the purpose of restoring a constitutional monarchy led by Orléans, followed by centrist and liberal positions on other issues. Renouvin gained only 43,722 votes (0.17%).

== See also ==
- Succession to the former French throne (Orléanist)
- Succession to the French throne
- French dynastic disputes
- Alliance Royale
- New Royalist Action
- French Action

== Bibliography ==
- Aston, Nigel (1988). Orleanism, 1780–1830. Vol. 38.
- Broglie, Gabriel de (1981). L'Orléanisme: La ressource libérale de la France (in French). Perrin (réédition numérique FeniXX). ISBN 9782262054014.
- Broglie, Gabriel de (2011). Fayard (ed.). La Monarchie de Juillet (in French).
- Robert, Hervé (1992). PUF (ed.). L'orléanisme (in French). Presses universitaires de France réédition numérique FeniXX. ISBN 9782705928605.
- Beik, Paul (1965). Louis Philippe and the July Monarchy. Van Nostrand Reinhold.
- Collingham, H. A. C. (1988). The July Monarchy: A Political History of France, 1830–1848. Longman.
- Howarth, T. E. B. (1962). Citizen-King: The Life of Louis Philippe, King of the French.
- Poisson, Georges (1999). Les Orléans, Une famille en quête d'un trône (in French). Perrin.
- Newman, Edgar; Simpson, Robert (1987). Historical Dictionary of France from the 1815 Restoration to the Second Empire. Westport, Connecticut: Greenwood Press. Archived from the original on 2011-06-28 – via Questia.
- Rémond, René (1966). The Right Wing in France: From 1815 to de Gaulle. Philadelphia: University of Pennsylvania Press.
- Passmore, Kevin (2013). The Right in France from the Third Republic to Vichy. Oxford: Oxford University Press. pp. 25–26.
- Montplaisir, Daniel de (2008). Perrin (ed.). Le Comte de Chambord, dernier roi de France (in French).
- Montplaisir, Daniel de (2011). Louis XX, petit-fils du roi Soleil (in French). Jacob-Duvernet.
