= Micaela, Countess of Paris =

Chilean-Spanish noblewoman (1938–2022)

Micaela Cousiño
- Countess of Paris
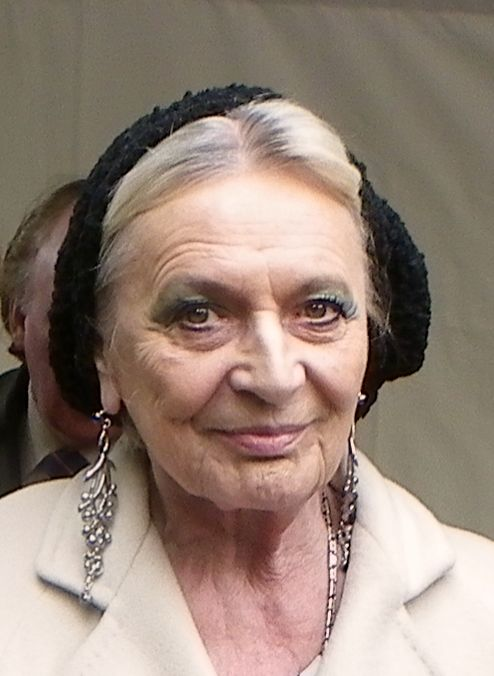

Consort of the Orléanist pretender to the French throne
- Pretendence: 26 September 2009 – 21 January 2019
- Born: Micaela Ana María del Pilar Cousiño; 30 April 1938; Vichy, Allier, France
- Died: 13 March 2022 (aged 83); Paris, France
- Spouse: Jean-Robert Bœuf (m. 1961; div. 1966) Henri d'Orléans, Count of Paris (m. 1984; died 2019)
- Issue: Alexis Bœuf
- House: Orléans (by marriage)
- Father: Luis Maximiliano Cousiño
- Mother: Antonia Quiñones de Léon, 4th Marchioness of San Carlos
- Religion: Catholicism

Micaela Ana María del Pilar Cousiño (30 April 1938 – 13 March 2022) was a Chilean-Spanish noblewoman and second wife of Henri, Count of Paris, Orléanist pretender to the French throne from 1999 until his death in 2019.

== Early life ==
Micaela Ana María del Pilar Cousiño was born in Vichy, Allier, France, on 30 April 1938. She was the daughter of Luis Maximiliano Cousiño, heir to one of the largest family fortunes of Chile, dating from the 18th century, and his wife, Antonia Quiñones de Léon, 4th Marchioness of San Carlos, of the marquesses of Montevirgen.

== Career ==
Micaela Cousiño started her career on the radio in France. Later, she worked for a press agency - a large advertising group both in Madrid and in Paris. From 1978 to May 1981, she became responsible for the communication of the minister and the senior directors at the cabinet of then government minister Raymond Barre. She also worked as an employee of the Cancer Research Association for a year in 1982. Cumplió labores culturales en el castillo del príncipe Lagarde-Salignac.

Since the accession of her late husband as head of the Royal House of Orléans, she became involved with the family's activities and participated in many events together with other members of the family.

== Marriages and children ==
Micaela Cousiño was married twice. Firstly she married civilly Jean-Robert Bœuf in 1961, with whom she had a son, Alexis Bœuf. Secondly, in 1984, she married Henri d'Orléans, Count of Paris, having had no offspring from this marriage.

Henri d'Orléans, then Count of Clermont, and Micaela married civilly in 1984. This marriage was without the consent of Henri's father, then head of the House of Orléans, who initially declared Henri disinherited, substituting the non-dynastic title Comte de Mortain for his son's Clermont countship (the latter once held in appanage by a son of Louis IX of France, who became ancestor of the Bourbon-Orléans line). Henri refused to acknowledge this title, but this act created a lasting division within the Orléans family.

Tensions lessened after several years, and on 7 March 1991 the Count of Paris reinstated Henri as heir apparent and Count of Clermont.

Micaela died on 13 March 2022 at the age of 83 in Paris.

== Ancestors ==
Ancestors of Micaela, Countess of Paris

8. Luis Cousiño Squella
4. Luis Alberto Cousiño Goyenechea
9. Isidora Goyenechea Gallo
2. Luis Maximiliano Cousiño Sébire
10. Amable François Sébire
5. Marie Louise Luisa Sébire Diot
11. Marie Diot
1. Micaela Ana María del Pilar Cousiño
12. Cayo Quiñones de León y Santalla
6. Fernando Juan José Quiñones de León y Francisco-Martín, 2nd Marquis of San Carlos
13. Ana de Francisco-Martín y Orrantia, 1st Marquise of San Carlos
3. Antonia María Micaela Quiñones de Leon y Bañuelos, 4th Marquise of San Carlos
14. Miguel de los Santos de Bañuelos y Travel, 1st Count of Bañuelos
7. Antonia de Bañuelos y Thorndyke, 2nd Countess of Bañuelos
15. Mary Adeline Thorndike

== See also ==
- Orléanist

== Bibliography ==
- Opfell, Olga S. (2001). "H.R.H. Henri, Count of Paris: Royal House of France House of Bourbon-Orleans". Royalty Who Wait: The 21 Heads of Formerly Regnant Houses of Europe. Jefferson. pp. 21–32.
- Mallalieu, Huon (9 December 2015). "Art Market: Vive la Revolution!". Country Life: 88–89.

Micaela, Countess of Paris Born: 30 April 1938 Died: 13 March 2022
Titles in pretence
Vacant Title last held by Duchess Marie-Thérèse of Württemberg	— TITULAR — Queen consort of France; 26 September 2009 – 21 January 2019	Succeeded by Philomena de Tornos Steinhart
