= Le Courrier français (1948–1950) =

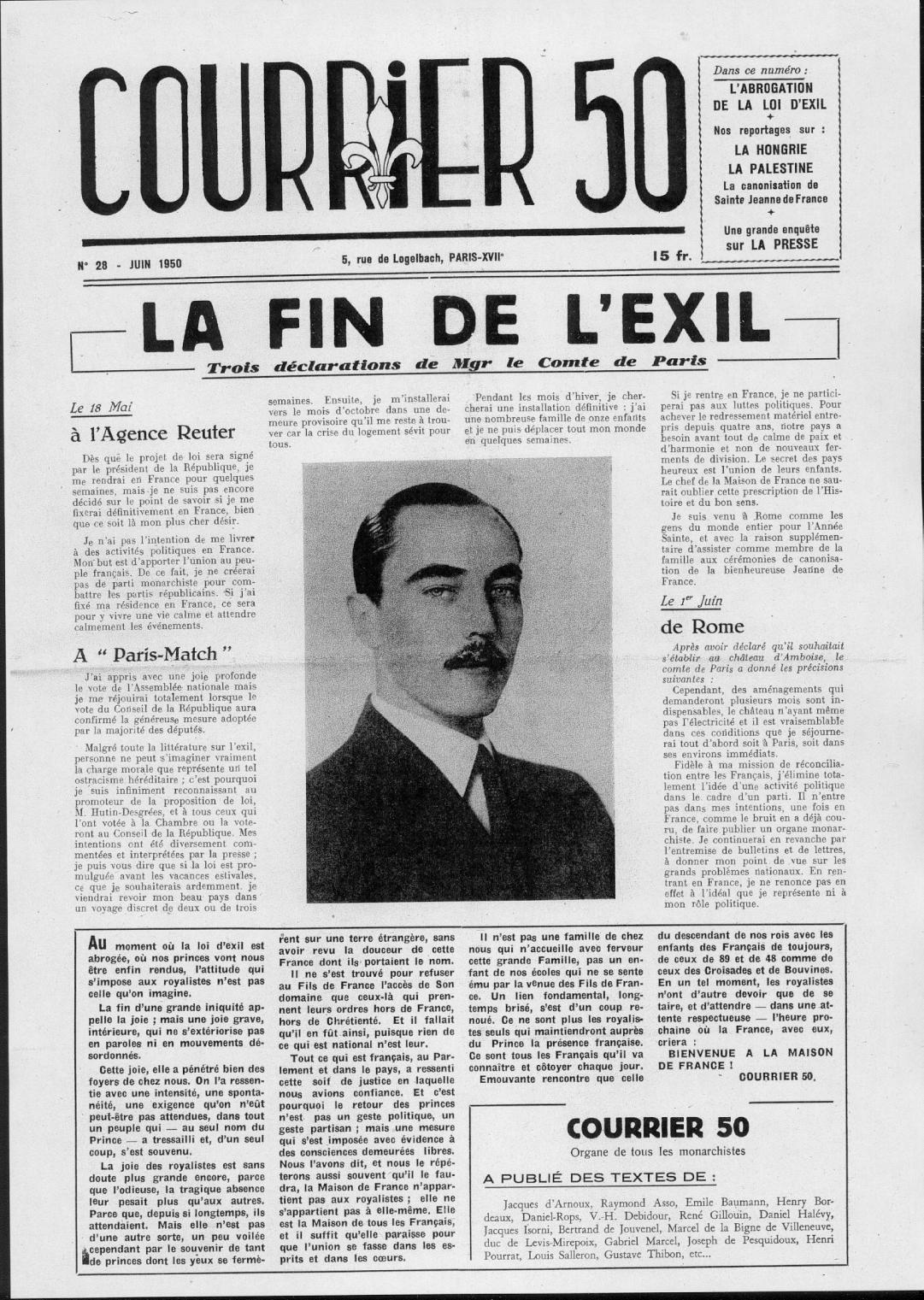
- Page 1 of Courrier 50 on the return from exile of the Count of Paris
- Categories: Royalist journal
- First issue: 1948-1950
- Country: France
- Language: French

Le Courrier français (French pronunciation: [lə kuʁje fʁɑ̃sɛ]) was a French monthly journal that appeared from March 1948 to June 1950. It was published by royalist supporters of Henri, Count of Paris (1908–1999). In successive years it took the names Le Courrier 48, Le Courrier 49 and Le Courrier 50.

The monarchist paper Ici France was launched in October 1946. In May 1947 it became a 16-page weekly with abundant illustrations mainly concerning the royal family. It disappeared in November 1947. Le Courrier de la Mesnie decided to replace Ici France with the same formula and many of its staff. Le Courrier français was launched in March 1948, and was later renamed Courrier 48. The new monthly supported the Count of Paris but did not depend on him for financing. Courier 49 (No. 15) published a letter from Gabriel Marcel to Pierre Boutang on the detention of Charles Maurras.

The chief editor was Maurice Colinon and the main contributors were Jacques Baulmier, René Chissey, Victor-Henry Debidour, Michel de Saint-Pierre, Maurice d’Olziac, Guy Coutant de Saisseval and François Chatel. Occasional contributors included Daniel-Rops, Gabriel Marcel, Marcel de La Bigne de Villeneuve, Henri Pourrat, Louis Salleron, Henry Bordeaux, René Gillouin, Jean-François Gravier, Daniel Halévy, Jacques Isorni, Bertrand de Jouvenel, duc de Levis-Mirepoix, Joseph de Pesquidoux and Gustave Thibon.

Le Courrier français was one of several ephemeral royalist publications, others being Force populaire, Le Nouveau Régime, Lys Rouge and L'Etandard. The journal never had the stature of Ici France. It had smaller circulation, fewer pages and less distinguished contributors. It ceased to appear in June 1950 after the return of the prince, and was never any help to him.
