= Le Nouvion-en-Thiérache =

- Commune
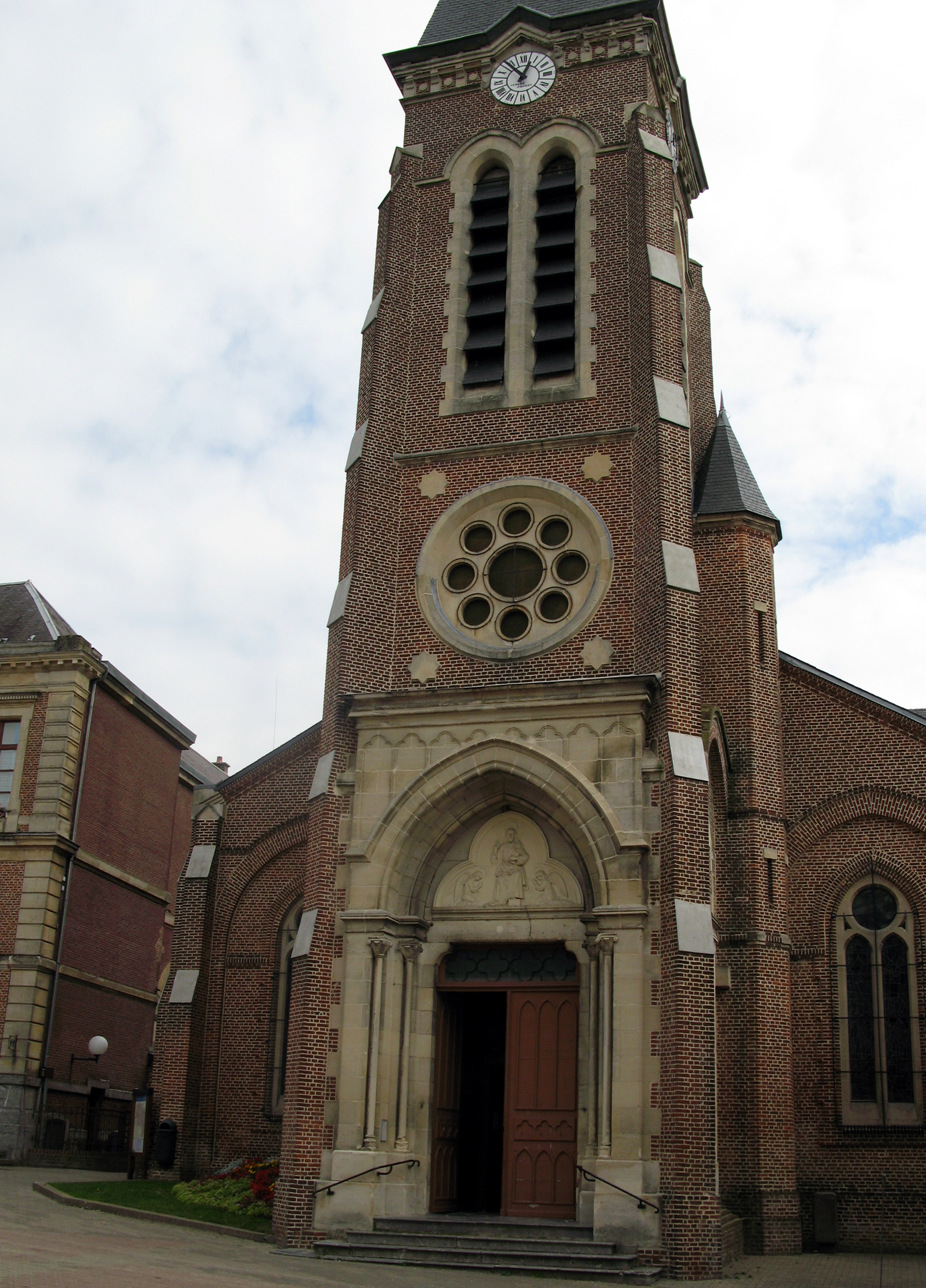
- The church of Le Nouvion-en-Thiérache

- Coat of arms
- Location of Le Nouvion-en-Thiérache
- Location within France Location within Hauts-de-France
- Coordinates: 50°01′05″N 3°47′09″E
- Country: France
- Region: Hauts-de-France
- Department: Aisne
- Arrondissement: Vervins
- Canton: Guise
- Intercommunality: Thiérache du Centre

Government
  - Mayor (2026–32): Erick Betremieux
- Area^{1}: 48.42 km^{2} (18.70 sq mi)
- Elevation: 185 m (607 ft)
- Highest elevation: 229 m (751 ft)
- Lowest elevation: 154 m (505 ft)
- Population (2023): 2,468
  - Density: 50.97/km^{2} (132.0/sq mi)
- Time zone: UTC+01:00 (CET)
  - Summer (DST): UTC+02:00 (CEST)
- INSEE/Postal code: 02558 /02170
- ^{1} French Land Register data, which excludes lakes, ponds, glaciers > 1 km^{2} (0.386 sq mi or 247 acres) and river estuaries.

Le Nouvion-en-Thiérache (French pronunciation: [lə nuvjɔ̃ ɑ̃ tjeʁaʃ], literally Le Nouvion in Thiérache; Picard: Ch' Nouvion-in-Thiérache) is a commune in the Aisne department, region of Hauts-de-France (formerly Picardy), northern France.

== Population ==
Historical population

Year	Pop.	±% p.a.
1793	3,018	—
1800	3,357	+1.53%
1806	3,082	−1.41%
1821	3,158	+0.16%
1831	3,106	−0.17%
1836	3,068	−0.25%
1841	3,045	−0.15%
1846	3,240	+1.25%
1851	3,295	+0.34%
1856	3,094	−1.25%
1861	3,070	−0.16%
1866	3,261	+1.21%
1872	3,172	−0.46%
1876	3,273	+0.79%
1881	3,334	+0.37%
1886	3,209	−0.76%
1891	3,110	−0.62%
1896	3,085	−0.16%
1901	3,189	+0.67%

Year	Pop.	±% p.a.
1906	2,977	−1.37%
1911	2,875	−0.69%
1921	2,628	−0.89%
1926	2,851	+1.64%
1931	2,623	−1.65%
1936	2,636	+0.10%
1946	2,455	−0.71%
1954	2,684	+1.12%
1962	3,096	+1.80%
1968	3,343	+1.29%
1975	3,247	−0.42%
1982	3,139	−0.48%
1990	2,905	−0.96%
1999	2,917	+0.05%
2007	2,823	−0.41%
2012	2,801	−0.16%
2017	2,602	−1.46%
2023	2,468	−0.88%

Source: EHESS and INSEE (1968-2023)

== History ==
=== World War I ===
On 27 August 1914, 210 houses in Le Nouvion-en-Thiérache were destroyed. On 3 October 1914 the Germans requisitioned cars and trucks, six bicycles, candles and kerosene. Every day, the town had to supply the Germans with 100 kg of assorted meat, 85 kg of bread, 48 kg of oats, 8 bales of alfalfa; 8 bales of straw, carrots, turnips, a cabbage and 200 kg of coal. A large part of the Nouvion-en-Thiérache forest is requisitioned and cut down to produce coal and rifle butts. On 6 November 1918 the town was liberated.

== Personalities ==
- Kamini (born 1979), rapper, comedian and screenwriter.
- Ernest Lavisse (1842-1922), historian.
- Adrien Fainsilber (1932-2023), architect and urbanist.

== See also ==
- Communes of the Aisne department
