= List of princesses of Greece by marriage =

Coat of arms of the King of the Hellenes

This is a list of Greek princesses by marriage from the accession of Geórgios I to the throne of the Kingdom of Greece in 1863. Individuals holding the title of princess would usually also be styled "Her Royal Highness" (HRH).

Elizabeth II, Queen of the United Kingdom, Marína Kárella and Irina Aleksandrovna Ovtchinnikova, while meeting most of the requirements, are not classed princesses by marriage of Greece, because Prince Fílippos, husband of Elizabeth II, renounced his Greek (and Danish) titles, Prince Michaíll had a morganatic marriage, and Prince Pétros lost his succession rights upon his marriage.

== List of Greek princesses by marriage since 1863 ==
Portrait	Name	Greek name	Arms	Born	Died	Marriage	Husband
	Princess Sophia of Prussia	Sofía		14 June 1870	13 January 1932	27 October 1889	Crown Prince Constantine
	Princess Marie Bonaparte	María		2 July 1882	21 September 1962	21 November 1907	Prince George
	Grand Duchess Elena Vladimirovna of Russia	Eléni		29 January 1882	13 March 1957	29 August 1902	Prince Nicholas
	Princess Alice of Battenberg	Alíki		25 February 1885	5 December 1969	6 October 1903	Prince Andrew
	Nancy Stewart	Anastasía		20 January 1878	29 August 1923	1 February 1923	Prince Christopher
	Frances, Daughter of France	Frankíski		25 December 1902	25 February 1953	11 February 1929	Prince Christopher
	Princess Elizabeth of Romania	Elisávet		12 October 1894	15 November 1956	27 February 1921 div. 1935	Crown Prince George
	Aspasía Mánou	Aspasía		4 September 1896	7 August 1972	4 November 1919	King Alexander
	Princess Frederica of Hanover	Freideríki		18 April 1917	6 February 1981	9 January 1938	Hereditary Prince Paul
	Marie-Chantal Miller	María		17 September 1968		1 July 1995	Crown Prince Paul
	Tatiana Blatnik	Tatiána		27 August 1980		25 August 2010 div. 2024	Prince Nicholas
	Nina Flohr	Nína		22 January 1987		12 December 2020	Prince Philip
	Chrysí Vardinogiánni	Chrysí		14 August 1981		7 February 2025	Prince Nicholas

== See also ==
- List of princesses of Greece by birth
- List of princesses of Denmark by marriage
- Monarchy of Greece
