= Princess Françoise of Orléans (1902–1953) =

Princess Françoise
- Princess Christopher of Greece and Denmark
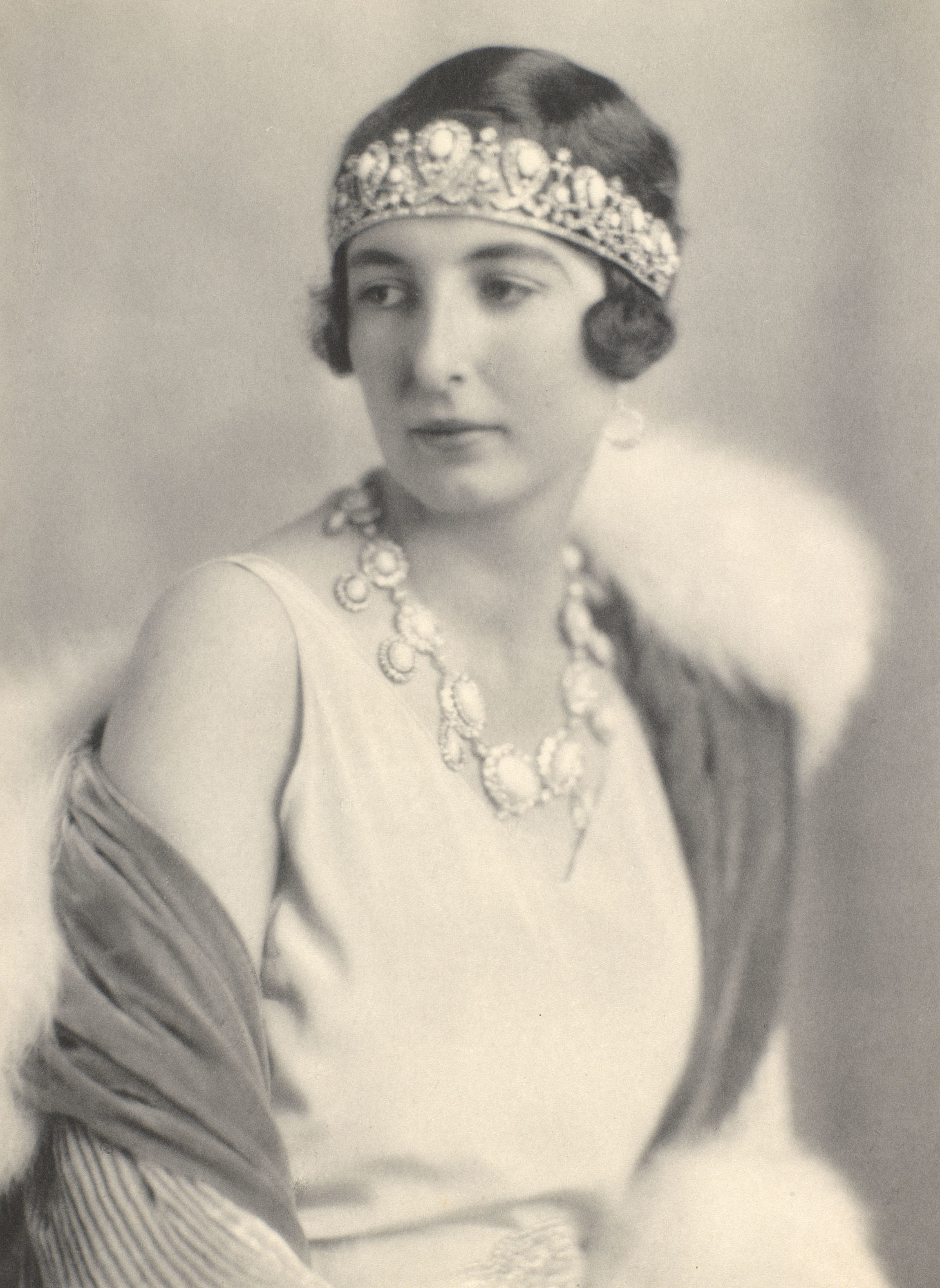
- Formal portrait, c. 1929–30
- Born: 25 December 1902; Paris, France
- Died: 25 February 1953 (aged 50); Paris, France
- Burial: Royal Cemetery, Tatoi Palace, Greece
- Spouse: Prince Christopher of Greece and Denmark (m. 1929; died 1940)
- Issue: Prince Michael of Greece and Denmark
Names
- Françoise Isabelle Louise Marie d'Orléans
- House: Orléans
- Father: Prince Jean, Duke of Guise
- Mother: Princess Isabelle d'Orléans

Princess Françoise d'Orléans (Françoise Isabelle Louise Marie; 25 December 1902 - 25 February 1953) was born an Orléans Princess of France and became a Princess of Greece and Denmark by marriage. She was thus a member of the Greek royal family and a descendant of the "Citizen-King" Louis Philippe I.

== Life ==
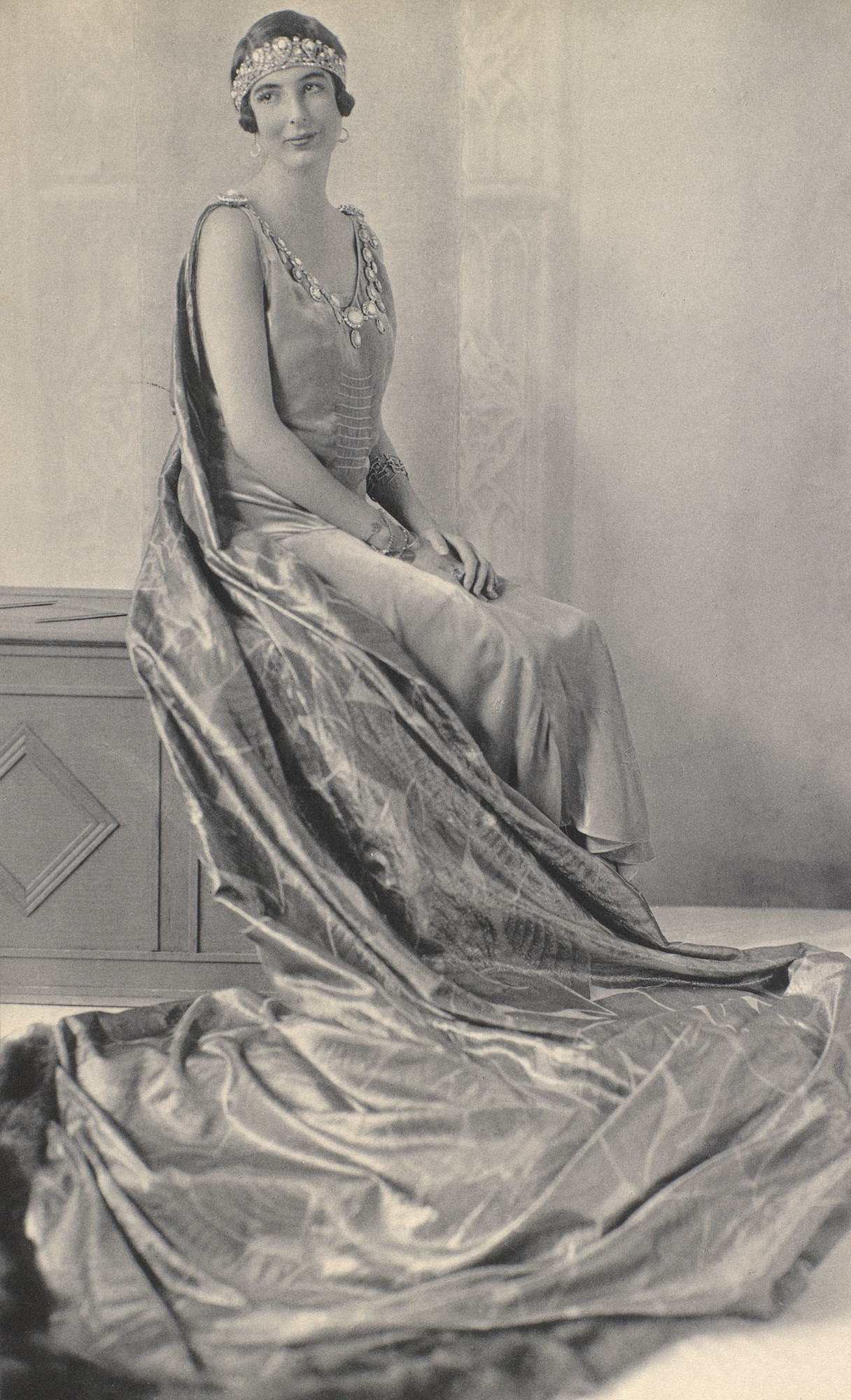
Photograph by Barrett, c. 1922

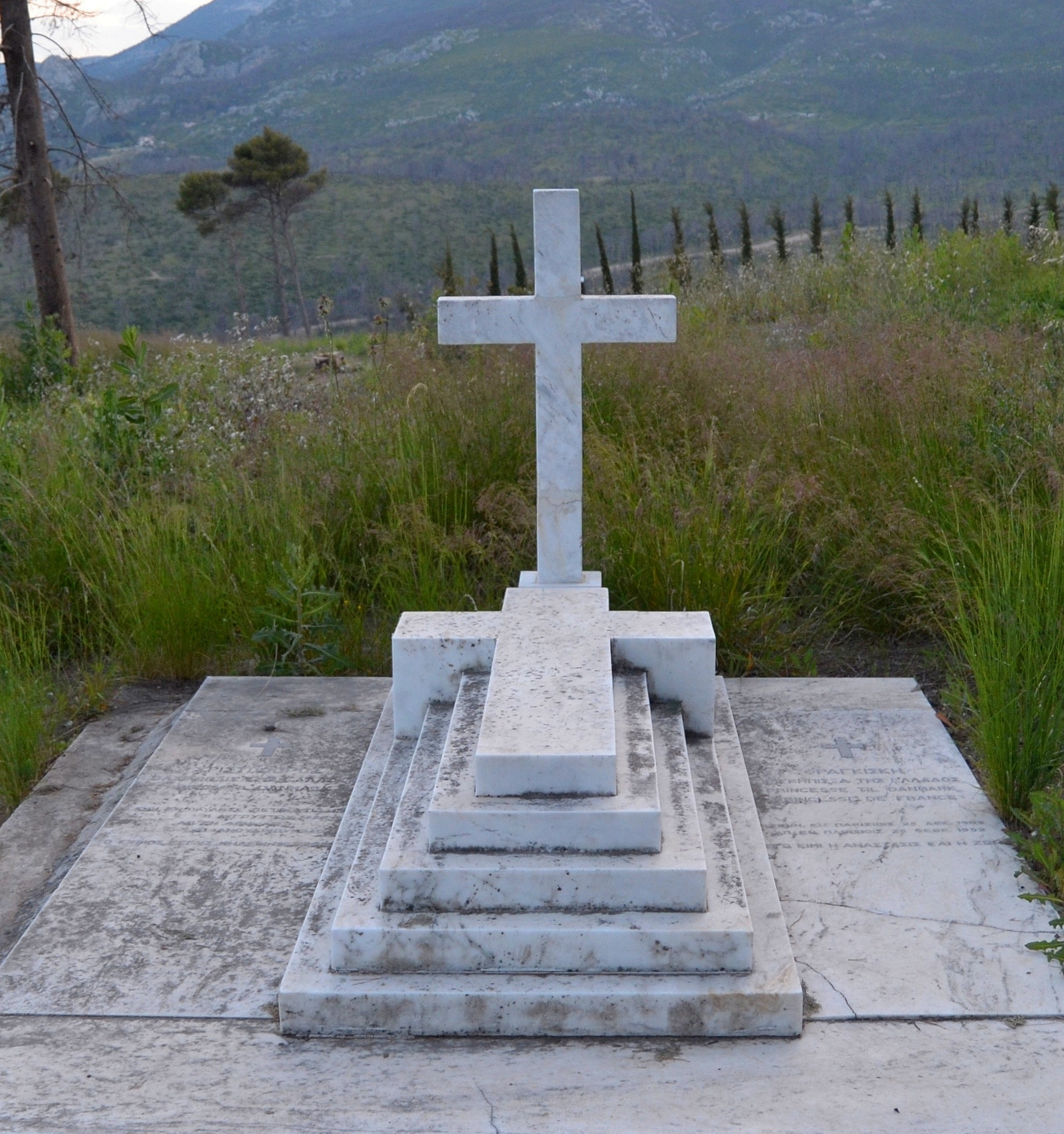
Tomb of Prince Christopher (left) and Princess Françoise (right) - Tatoi Royal Cemetery

Françoise d'Orléans was born in Paris, the second daughter of Jean d'Orléans, duc de Guise (an Orléanist pretender to the throne of France under the name Jean III) and his wife, the French Princess Isabelle of Orléans. Françoise's brother, Prince Henri, Count of Paris, succeeded their father as the Orleanist pretender, under the name Henri VI.

In Palermo on 11 February 1929, she married Prince Christopher of Greece and Denmark (1888–1940). This was Christopher's second marriage - he was the youngest son of King George I of Greece (1845–1913) and his wife, Grand Duchess Olga Constantinovna of Russia (1851–1926). Through his father, he was thus a grandson of King Christian IX of Denmark (1818–1906), nicknamed "the father-in-law of Europe" due to his six children all marrying into other royal families.

This royal marriage was unusual in that era, he was Greek Orthodox, she was Catholic. They had only one child, the writer Prince Michael of Greece and Denmark (1939–2024), whose marriage to the Greek artist Marina Karella (born 1940) did not conform to the laws of the royal house and thus deprived him of all right of succession to the Greek throne. She is grandmother of Princess Alexandra of Greece, an artist, art collector, arts patron, and child life specialist. Her other grand-daughter is Princess Olga of Greece, who married Prince Aimone of Savoy-Aosta, one of two claimants to be Head of the House of Savoy. In 1948, she decided to leave the city. The civil war in Greece was preventing her from entering, and the British government refused to grant her asylum. Françoise and her son Michael went to Paris, where they lived in the home of Princess Isabella and her second husband, Prince Pierre Murat. Françoise did not want to see anyone in their residence and rarely left her rooms. She eventually became depressed. She died on 25 February 1953 in Paris, aged 51. She is buried alongside her husband in Tatoi Royal Cemetery, Greece.

== Ancestry ==
Ancestors of Princess Françoise of Orléans (1902–1953)

8. Prince Ferdinand Philippe, Duke of Orléans (= 12)
4. Prince Robert, Duke of Chartres
9. Duchess Helene of Mecklenburg-Schwerin (= 13)
2. Prince Jean, Duke of Guise
10. François, Prince of Joinville
5. Princess Françoise of Orléans
11. Princess Francisca of Brazil
1. Princess Françoise of Orléans
12. Prince Ferdinand Philippe, Duke of Orléans (= 8)
6. Prince Philippe, Count of Paris
13. Duchess Helene of Mecklenburg-Schwerin (= 9)
3. Princess Isabelle of Orléans
14. Prince Antoine, Duke of Montpensier
7. Infanta María Isabel of Spain
15. Infanta Luisa Fernanda of Spain

== Bibliography ==
- Christopher of Greece, Memoirs of HRH Prince Christopher of Greece, The Right Book Club, London, 1938.
- (in French) Michael of Greece and Henri of Orléans, comte de Paris, Mon album de famille, Perrin, 1996. ISBN 2-262-01237-7
- (in French) Michael of Greece, Mémoires insolites, Xo, Paris, 2004 ISBN 2-84563-186-3
- (in French) Isabelle, countess of Paris, Tout m'est bonheur, Éditions Robert Laffont, Coll. « Vécu », Paris, 1978. ISBN 2-221-00107-9
- (in Spanish) Ricardo Mateos Sainz de Medrano, La Familia de la Reina Sofía, La Dinastía griega, la Casa de Hannover y los reales primos de Europa, La Esfera de los Libros, Madrid, 2004 ISBN 84-9734-195-3
