= Olga of Greece =

Olga of Greece may refer to:

- Olga Constantinovna of Russia (1851–1926), queen of Greece from 1867 until 1913
- Princess Olga of Greece and Denmark (1903–1997), Prince Nicholas of Greece and Denmark's daughter; Prince Paul of Yugoslavia's wife
- Princess Olga, Duchess of Aosta (b. 1971), daughter of Prince Michael of Greece and Denmark
- Princess Olga of Greece and Denmark (b. April 1880 – d. November 1880), infant daughter of King George I of Greece
