= Françoise d'Orléans =

Françoise d'Orléans may refer to:

- Françoise d'Orléans-Longueville (1549–1601), the second wife of Louis I, Prince of Condé
- Françoise Madeleine d'Orléans (1648–1664), Duchess of Savoy
- Princess Françoise d'Orléans (1844–1925), Duchess of Chartres
- Princess Françoise d'Orléans (1902–1953), Princess of Greece and Denmark by marriage
