= Princess Alexandra of Greece (born 1968) =

Greek royal, artist, and art collector

Princess Alexandra
- Mrs Nicolas Mirzayantz
- Born: 15 October 1968 (age 57); Athens, Greece
- Spouse: Nicolas Mirzayantz (m. 1998)
- Issue: Tigran Mirzayantz; Darius Mirzayantz
Names
- Alexándra Élli Frankíski María
- House: Glücksburg
- Father: Prince Michael of Greece and Denmark
- Mother: Marina Karella
- Occupation: artist, art collector, arts patron, child life specialist

Styles of Princess Alexandra of Greece
- Reference style: Her Highness
- Spoken style: Your Highness

Princess Alexandra Elli Francisca Maria of Greece (born 15 October 1968), known professionally as Alexandra Mirzayantz, is a Greek artist, art collector, arts patron, and child life specialist. As the daughter of Prince Michael of Greece and Denmark, she is a member of the Greek royal family and a relative of the Danish royal family. A morganatic descendant of the House of Glücksburg, she is not a Danish princess nor is she entitled to the style Royal Highness as other members of the Greek royal family are. She was born a princess of Greece entitled to the style Your Highness, and was excluded from the line of succession to the Greek throne. She is a second cousin of Constantine II of Greece, who reigned as King of the Hellenes until the monarchy was abolished in 1973.

== Early life and family ==
Princess Alexandra was born in Athens on 15 October 1968. She is the daughter of the historian Prince Michael of Greece and Denmark and the artist Marina Karella. She is the older sister of Princess Olga. She is a great-granddaughter of George I of Greece and Olga Constantinovna of Russia. She is also a great-granddaughter of Prince Jean, Duke of Guise and a great-great-granddaughter of Christian IX of Denmark. As Princess Alexandra's parents' marriage is morganatic, and therefore non-dynastic, she is a Greek princess by birth but not a Danish princess, uses the style Your Highness instead of Her Royal Highness, and is excluded from the line of succession to the former Greek throne.

On 29 July 1973, Princess Alexandra's second cousin, Constantine II of Greece, was deposed and the Greek monarchy was abolished.

== Career ==
Princess Alexandra is a certified child life specialist.

In 2018, she graduated with a master's degree in fine arts from the New York Academy of Art. She works as a painter and portraitist. She has cited Melina Mercouri, Rita Wilson, Niki de Saint Phalle, Willem Claesz. Heda, and Rembrandt as her artistic inspiration. In 2020, she painted portraits of National Health Service members as part of a fundraising initiative. In 2022 she sold paintings as part of a benefit for visual aids.

Princess Alexandra and her husband are patrons of the New York art scene. She is also an art collector. She owns a portrait of her grandfather, Prince Christopher of Greece and Denmark, painted by Philip de László in 1919, as part of her collection.

== Personal life ==
Princess Alexandra married the perfumer Nicolas Mirzayantz on 27 June 1998 in Torcello. They have two sons.

He is vice president of global business development for International Flavors & Fragrances.

She is active in the New York social scene. In 2007, she was inducted into the International Best Dressed Hall of Fame List.

She attended the funeral of her father, Prince Michael on 1 August 2024, and was seen with other Greek royal family members, including Princess Olga, Queen Anne-Marie of Greece, Queen Sofía of Spain, and Crown Prince Pavlos.
