= The Apaches of Athens =

1930 Greek silent film

- Theatrical Poster
- Directed by: Dimitris Gaziadis
- Screenplay by: Yiannis Prineas
- Based on: Apaches of Athens
- Produced by: Dimitris Gaziadis; Alexandros Gaziadis; Kostas Gaziadis; Michalis Gaziadis
- Starring: Petros Epitropakis; Mery Sagianou-Katseli; Stella Christoforidou; Yiannis Prineas; Petros Kyriakos; George Christoforidis; Nikolaos Perdikis
- Cinematography: Michalis Gaziadis
- Music by: Nikos Hadziapostolou
- Production company: Dag Films
- Release date: 28 April 1930
- Running time: 7 reels 93 minutes
- Country: Greece
- Languages: Silent film; Greek French intertitles

The Apaches of Athens (Greek: Οι Απάχηδες των Αθηνών) is a 1930 Greek silent film directed by Dimitrios Gaziadis. It was one of the first Greek silent films to feature recorded sound via a gramophone. The method was also attempted by the film Astero. Apaches of Athens was produced by the DAG film company and is based on the 1921 operetta of the same name by Nikos Hadziapostolou and Yiannis Prineas. Yiannis Prineas appears in the film as the character Nikolas Karoubas. The term Apaches (απάχης) means "hoodlum" or "criminal" and the title is translated to "hoodlums of Athens". The story is a romantic adventure about an Athenian petty criminal named Petros aka the Prince. His name in the original story was Kostas. The film was rebooted in 1950 produced by Olympia Film directed by Ilias Paraskevas and written by Yiannis Prineas.

The film premiered in Athens on 28 April 1930 at the Attikon theater. It was very successful in Greece and was shown in several European countries namely England, France, Sweden and Norway. The film was also shown in parts of Egypt and Turkey. The film received mixed reviews from the media mostly because of the failed synchronization of sound which used an external gramophone at 78 RPM that sometimes did not overlap with the actor's lips moving. DAG films could not afford the vitaphone therefore the company did not produce the first talking film in Greece which was accomplished in the 1932 film Sweetheart of a Shepherdess (Ο Αγαπητικός της βοσκοπούλας).

The film was lost until 2016. It was discovered in the film library of France and restored due to the generous donation of The Stavros Niarchos Foundation. The French title was Les Apaches d'Athenes and it featured French intertitles instead of dialog. The film was digitized to 4K and 35mm copies, and the music was reconstructed. The cost was close to 121,000 euros and featured the collaboration of Kostas Gavras, the Greek Film Archive, the French Film Archive and of the National Opera of Greece. The supervisor was Maria Komninou. The film was processed at the L'Immagine Ritrovata workshops in Bologna and Paris. The film premiered on 15 February 2020 right before the outbreak of the COVID-19 pandemic at the Stavros Niarchos Hall featuring free admission. The film was set to be screened in countless film festivals worldwide but never did because of the covid shutdown.

== Plot ==
The Apaches of Athens (1930)

The film opens at the apartment of Petros Labetis also known as the prince. His landlord is trying to collect rent but the prince does not want to pay him. Two of his friends Giorgios and Nikolas (Yiannis Prineas) arrive and they are planning their day all three of them were orphans and rebels. The prince walks past Titika an event he does every day. She is a beautiful florist but she is also poor. The prince encounters a group of orphan children but is very rude to them and the prince meets up with his friends Giorgios and Nikolas at the local restaurant. The next scene opens with the three friends gambling on the street but they encounter a large group of orphans and a rock war ensues. The prince is injured and Titika nurses him back to health. She clearly has a crush on the prince. The film documents the poor orphans of the city and the life of the impoverished community. The film introduces a wealthy millionaire named Athanasios Paralis and his lavish estate which was Tatoi Palace. His daughter Vera Paralis inherited a massive fortune from her mother who recently died. Athanasios' secretary is Zinovion Kiriakon. Zinovion has a crush on Vera and wants to marry her. Vera is riding her horse but loses control and falls off. The prince finds her on the side of the road and helps her recover. Vera falls in love with the prince. Meanwhile, Zinovios tells Athanasios he wants to marry his daughter but the wealthy millionaire did not approve the request instead he insulted Zinovios.

Zinovios hires the prince to pretend to be a real prince to insult Vera and Athanasios to make Zinovios look like a hero. On her birthday he will be introduced as the Prince of Athonos. A short while after the prince, Giorgios, and Nikolas receive a deposit for the scam a messenger wants to bring news to the prince and his friends that he just inherited a massive fortune in Canada but the three rebels believe he is a bill collector and send him away. Because they received a down payment from Zinovios, Giorgios, and Nikolas finally fulfill their dream to take a ride in a taxi. The film takes viewers for a ride in Athens during the 1930s. The big party for Vera finally occurs and the Prince of Athonos arrives dressed in a very expensive suit and plays the role of a real prince to impress the wealthy socialites. Giorgios and Nikolas find expensive suits and crash the party and the prince introduces them as his friends. Titika was also at the party she was hired as the florist for the big celebration. She recognized the prince and they had a brief encounter. Zinovios tells the wealthy millionaire Athanasios that the prince is a fraud and has him escorted from the mansion compound. The family sends their butler to apologize to the prince and welcome him back to the mansion but he refused because he loved Titika. The messenger finally was able to tell the prince about his massive inheritance from Canada. Titika and the prince live happily ever after.

== Analysis ==
The film offers a rich history. The Gaziadis family collaborated on the film. George Christoforidis the actor that played the wealthy elite Athanasios Paralis was a prominent actor during the Ottoman Empire and migrated to Greece. His real daughter Stella Christoforidou actually played his daughter Vera Paralis in the film. One of the writers of the play Yiannis Prineas appears in the film as the character Nikolas Karoubas. Part of the film was actually filmed at the estate of the Greek royal family Tatoi Palace. At the time King George II was exiled with his family and the Greek government allowed the filming of the movie.

== Cast ==
- Petros Epitropakis as the prince or (Petros Labetis)
- Mery Sagianou-Katseli as Titika
- Stella Christoforidou as Vera Paralis
- Yiannis Prineas as Nikolas Karoubas
- Petros Kyriakos as Giorgios Karkaletsos
- George Christoforidis as Athanasios Paralis
- Nikolaos Perdikis as Zinovion Kiriakon

== Bibliography ==
- Bruzzo, Mariona; Sala, Teresa M. (2019). I Media Cities Innovative e-Environment for Research on Cities and the Media. Bologna, Italy: Bologna University Press. ISBN 9788491682769.
- Poupou, Anna (December 2017). "Modern Space and Narration in the Greek Films of the Interwar Period". Film Icon: Journal of Greek Film Studies (4). ISSN 2241-6692. Archived from the original on 2 August 2019.
- Karalis, Vrasidas (2012). A History of Greek Cinema. London, UK: Continuum International Publishing. ISBN 9781441194473.
- Tsiapos, Argyris (2015). Οι Πρώτες Ταινίες του Ελληνικού Κινηματογράφου Η Ιστορία του Προπολεμικού Ελληνικού Σινεμά [The First Films of Greek Cinema The History of Pre-War Greek Cinema] (in Greek). Athens, Greece: Serres Publishing. ISBN 978-960-93-7608-2.
- Paridis, Christos (2 April 2020). ""Οι Απάχηδες των Αθηνών": Η πρώτη "Άδουσα και Ηχητική" Ελληνική Ταινία Ζωντανεύει Ξανά στη Λυρική" [The Apaches of Athens": The first "Without Sound and Sound" Greek film Comes to Life Again at Lyriki] (in Greek). Athens, Greece: Lifo. Archived from the original on 23 March 2023.
- Lizardos, Alexandros Romanos (7 April 2022). "Οι Απάχηδες των Αθηνών Θερμή Υποδοχή της Αποκατεστημένης Κόπιας της Ταινίας στο Παρίσι" ["The Apaches of Athens": Warm Reception of the Restored Copy of the Film in Paris] (in Greek). Athens, Greece: ERT News. Archived from the original on 29 September 2022.
- Symboulidis, Haris (15 February 2020). "Οι Απάχηδες Των Αθηνών" [The Apachis of Athens] (in Greek). Athens, Greece: Avopolis. Archived from the original on 23 March 2023.
