= Aimone di Savoia Aosta (born 1967) =

Disputed head of the house of Savoy since 2021

Aimone
- Duke of Aosta; Duke of Savoy (disputed)
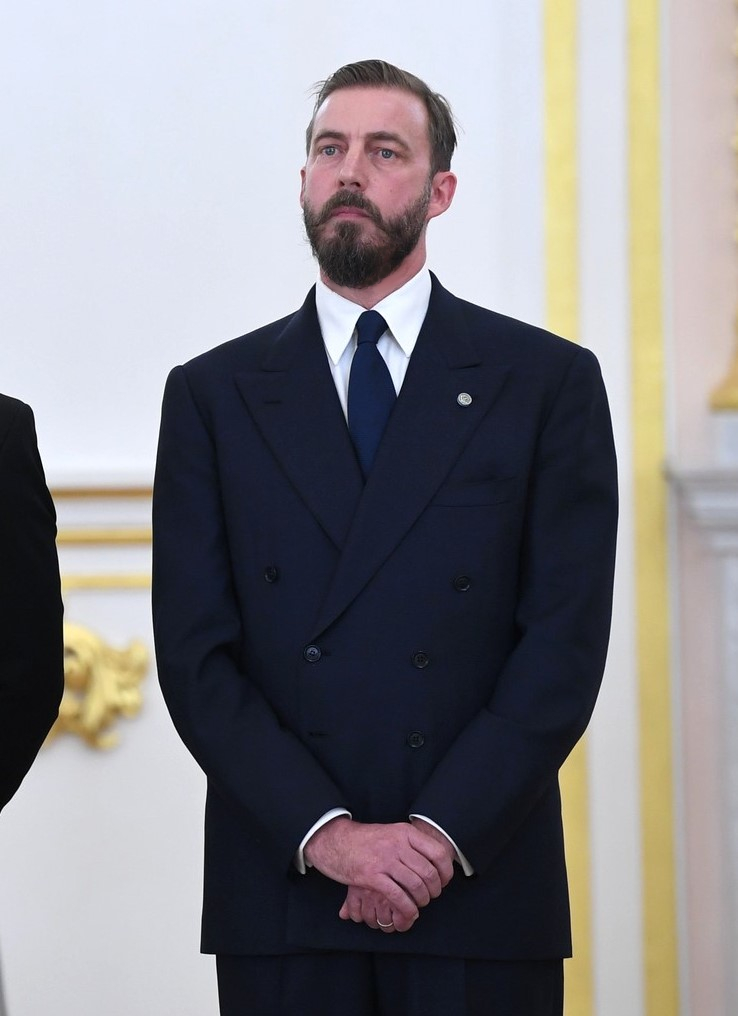
- Aimone in 2020

Head of the House of Savoy (disputed)
- Tenure: 1 June 2021 – present
- Predecessor: Prince Amedeo
- Heir apparent: Prince Umberto
- Born: 13 October 1967 (age 59); Florence, Italy
- Spouse: Princess Olga of Greece (m. 2008)
- Issue: Prince Umberto; Prince Amedeo; Princess Isabella
Names
- Aimone Umberto Emanuele Filiberto Luigi Amedeo Elena Maria Fiorenzo
- House: Savoy
- Father: Prince Amedeo, 5th Duke of Aosta
- Mother: Princess Claude of Orléans
- Religion: Roman Catholicism

Aimone of Savoy-Aosta, 6th Duke of Aosta (Aimone Umberto Emanuele Filiberto Luigi Amedeo Elena Maria Fiorenzo di Savoia-Aosta; born 13 October 1967) is an Italian businessman and one of two claimants to be head of the House of Savoy. Since November 2019, he has served as the Ambassador of the Sovereign Military Order of Malta to Russia.

== Education and career ==
Aimone was born in Florence, the second child and only son of Prince Amedeo of Savoy, Duke of Aosta and his first wife, Princess Claude of Orléans. Aimone attended the Francesco Morosini Naval Military School and Bocconi University. After he completed his education, Aimone worked at JPMorgan Chase in the United Kingdom. After attending the Italian Naval Academy, he also served a period in the Italian Navy's special forces (see Comando Raggruppamento Subacquei e Incursori Teseo Tesei).

Beginning in 2000, Aimone was the president of Pirelli operations in Russia. Since 2012, he has also served as CEO of Pirelli Tyre's Nordic division. His contribution to deepening bilateral economic relations between Italy and Russia has been recognized by the authorities of both countries, by the appointment to the Order of Friendship of Russia and the Order of Merit of the Italian Republic.

== Marriage and children ==
Aimone's engagement to Princess Olga of Greece, daughter of Prince Michael of Greece and Denmark, was announced in May 2005. Olga and Aimone are second cousins; both being great-grandchildren of the French pretender Prince Jean, Duke of Guise. They are also second cousins once-removed, as George I of Greece is Olga's patrilineal great-grandfather and Aimone's great-great-grandfather. Several falsely reported wedding dates marked what was to become a three-year engagement. The couple finally wed on 16 September 2008 at the Italian embassy in Moscow, the city in which Aimone is employed. Their religious marriage took place on 27 September 2008 in Patmos.

Aimone and Olga have three children, two sons and one daughter:

- Prince Umberto of Savoy-Aosta, (born on 7 March 2009) in Neuilly-sur-Seine, France, Duke of Spoleto.
- Prince Amedeo Michele of Savoy-Aosta, (born on 24 May 2011) in Neuilly-sur-Seine, France. A day after his birth Amedeo was granted the title Duke of the Abruzzi by his paternal grandfather.
- Princess Isabella Vita Marina of Savoy-Aosta, (born on 14 December 2012) in Paris, France. She was named in honour of Princess Isabelle of Orléans.

The boys are the only surviving young male members of the House of Savoy.

== Dynastic issues ==
Seal as head of the Royal House.

From birth, Aimone was known as Duke of Apulia (duca delle Puglie).

On 7 July 2006, Aimone's father, Prince Amedeo, Duke of Aosta, claimed the headship of the House of Savoy and the title Duke of Savoy, in opposition to his cousin Vittorio Emanuele, Prince of Naples. Amedeo defined Aimone as Duke of Aosta "in pectore". Amadeo died in 2021. On 3 February 2024, Vittorio Emanuele died, leaving his son Emanuele Filiberto of Savoy with the claim to the headship in opposition to Aimone.

Aimone di Savoia Aosta (born 1967) House of Savoy Born: 13 October 1967
Italian nobility
Preceded by Amedeo	6th Duke of Aosta; 7th creation 2021–present	Incumbent; Heir: Umberto
Titles in pretence
Preceded by Amedeo	— TITULAR — King of Italy (disputed); 2021–present Reason for succession failure: Kingdom abolished in 1946	Incumbent; Heir: Umberto
