= Tatoi Palace =

Greek palace associated with the former Greek Royal Family

Coordinates: 38°09′45.83″N 23°47′37.28″E

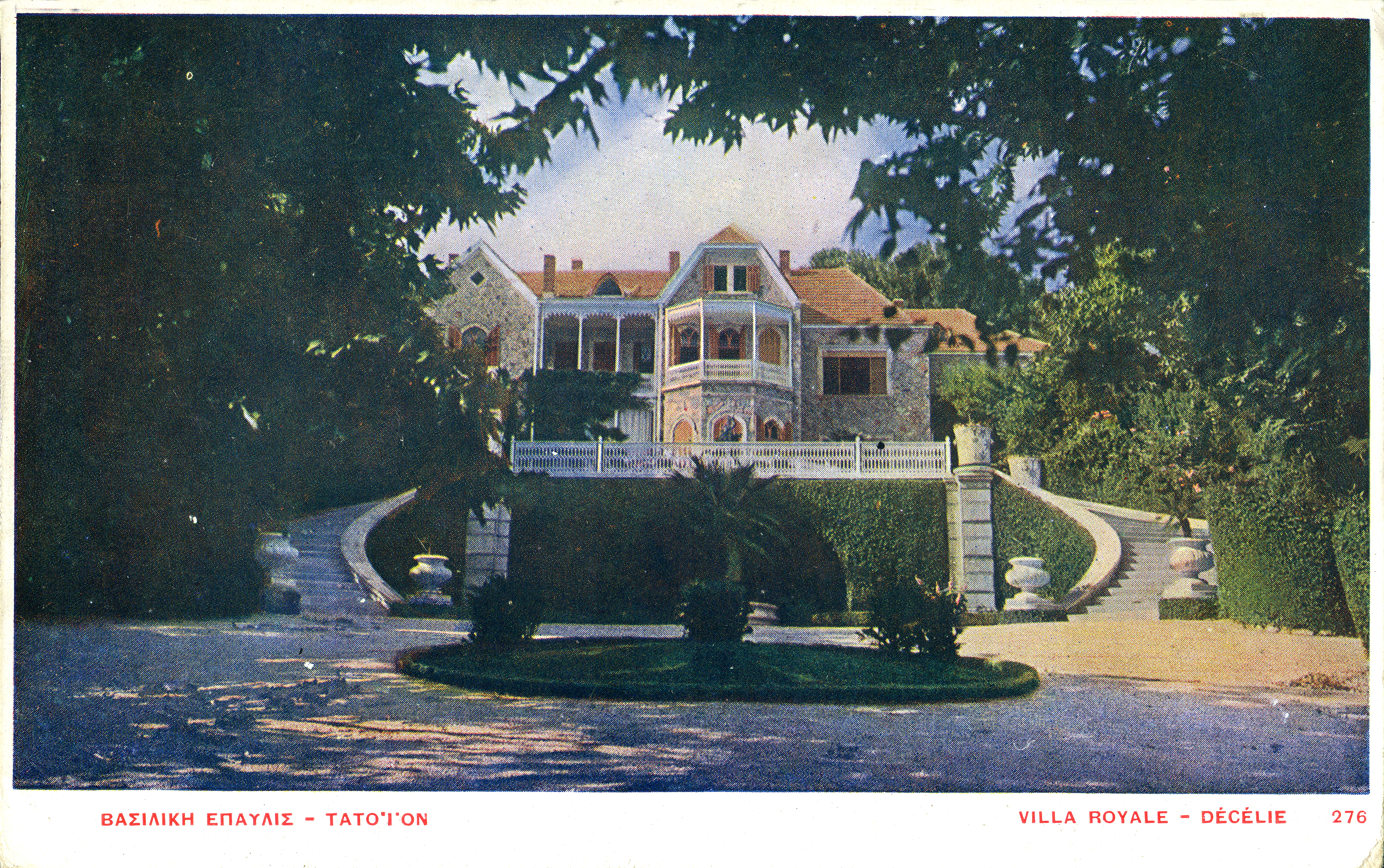
- Tatoi Palace c. 1915

General information
- Location: Parnitha, Attica, Greece
- Year built: 1884–86
- Owner: Greek royal family (1872–1924, 1936–1994); Government of Greece (1994–present)

Design and construction
- Architect: Ernst Ziller

Tatoi (Greek: Τατόι, pronounced [ta.ˈto.i]) was the summer palace and 42 km^{2} (10,000 acres) estate of the former Greek royal family. The area is a densely wooded southeast-facing slope of Mount Parnitha, and its ancient and current official name is Dekeleia. It is located 27 km (17 mi) from the city centre of Athens and 2.5 km (2 mi) from Kifissia.

== Development of the estate and ownership disputes ==
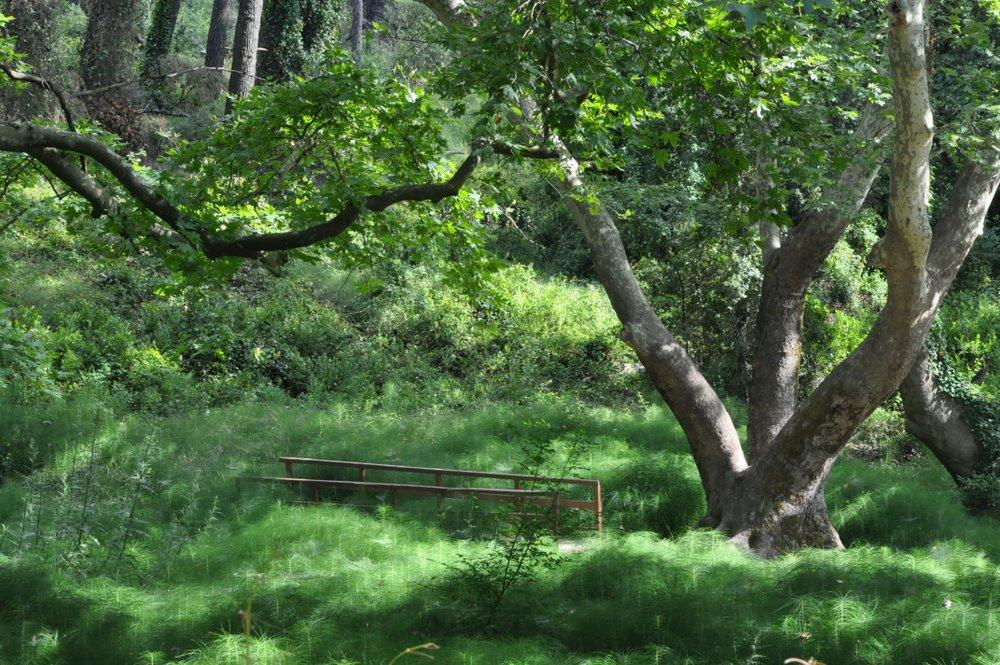
King's Forest.

King George I purchased the estate in 1872, purchasing it with private funds he had brought from Denmark.

In July 1916, an arson attack ravaged Tatoi Palace. The royal family barely escaped the flames. Among the palace personnel and firefighters who arrived to deal with the blaze, sixteen people were killed.

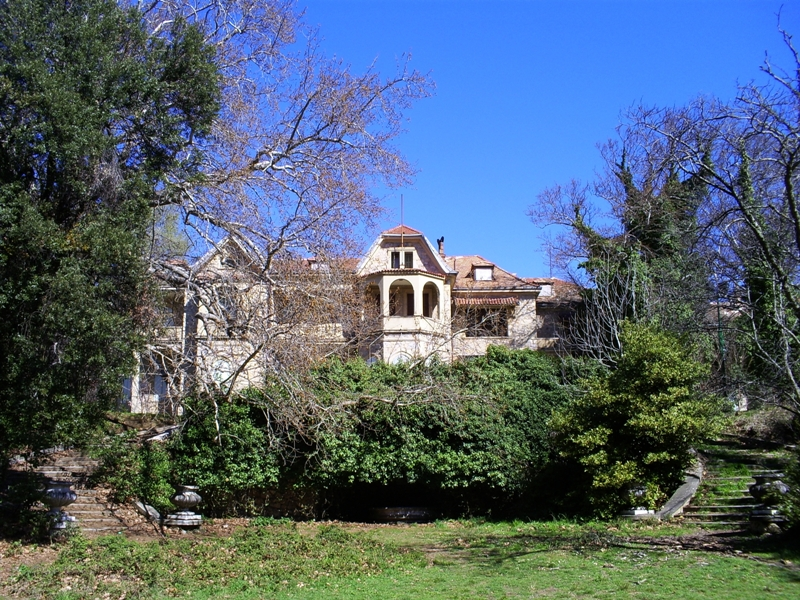
Partial view of the abandoned Tatoi Palace in 2008.

During the Republican regime in the 1920s, most of the estate was confiscated from its owners. Around 1929-1930 the government allowed Dimitrios Gaziadis to film the movie The Apaches of Athens (1930) at the lavish estate. In 1936, it was returned to King George II following the monarchy's restoration.

During the Second World War, when the King was in exile and Greeks suffered considerable hardships under German occupation, the woods at Tatoi were chopped down for fuel and corpses were buried in shallow graves.

King George II regained possession of the estate in 1946. It passed down as private property to King Constantine II until 1994, when the royal estates were confiscated by the government of Andreas Papandreou.

In 1973, the property was abandoned completely. Lack of funding resulted in the cows and horses dying of starvation in the stables. The buildings were subject to vandalism and looting, resulting in significant losses. A former cowshed was filled with objects from Rododafni Castle, the mansion at Psychico, Mon Repos palace, and other royal residences. With permission of the Government, in 1993, the ex-King was able to remove nine cargo crates of objects: some of this appeared at auction at Christies in 2007. There remained 17,000 objects, including antiquities, old masters, and a life-size portrait of Queen Anne-Marie that are now in storage at the Ministry of Culture.

== Restoration and reopening ==
In June 2007, the Government of Greece said it intended to turn the former palace and grounds into a museum. However, it was reported in September 2012 that the government now intended to sell the palace and its estate in the face of mounting financial pressure. Founded in 2012, the "Friends of Tatoi Association" has set itself the goal to restore the former royal estate and convert it to a museum and public venue, while facing political indifference and lack of money.

In 2015, ten cars which were kept in the former royal estate of Tatoi were designated as cultural monuments by the Central Council for Modern Monuments (ΚΣΝΜ). However, the cars, as well as the carriages (which were not included in the decision) remained in the ruins, with parts of the roof falling on the cars in 2016. As of 2020, the cars and carriages had been removed and restored as part of restoration efforts by the Greek government.

For several years, the Greek government had no plan for preservation of the Tatoi Palace, neighbouring buildings and the natural area around the Tatoi, and the estate suffered extensive age and weather damage. An idea to convert the former royal estate to a private winery or a resort with restaurants and barbecue was met with criticism by private persons and organisations, who feared it could erase the historical elements of the property, and who preferred to open Tatoi as a museum for the public. The former royal estate of Polydendri forest is also completely abandoned, and the buildings are in a state of decay.

In late 2019, the Greek culture ministry moved ahead with plans to finally restore the palace. After approximately a year of conservation work had been undertaken, the Greek government announced that the estate would become a mixed-use development after the completion of restoration. Plans are centered on the conversion of the main house into a museum of the royal family, as well as the construction of a new luxury hotel and spa. The 2021 forest fires were catastrophic for the estate: 16,997 hectares (42,000 acres) were burnt, with a fire breaking out in the Palace itself. While it was saved, two adjoining storage containers containing objects were destroyed. The area of the Royal Cemetery burned, but the Mausoleum and the Church of the Resurrection were saved. A number of estate buildings, including the Directorate building (which was being used to store furniture), the caretaker's house, the Telegraph Office and Sturm House, were lost.

Following the death of Constantine II, it was announced by Lina Mendoni, the Minister of Culture and Sports, that the government intended to transform Tatoi into a museum by 2025. The exterior was to be renovated and the royal gardens tidied. The project followed efforts to clean the palace and its surroundings for the burial of Constantine II. The forest had started to recover by 2024 and plans were announced to restore the gardens. The renovations were initially expected to be completed by late 2025.

In October 2026, it was reported that the palace was scheduled to reopen in December 2026.

== Buried at Tatoi ==
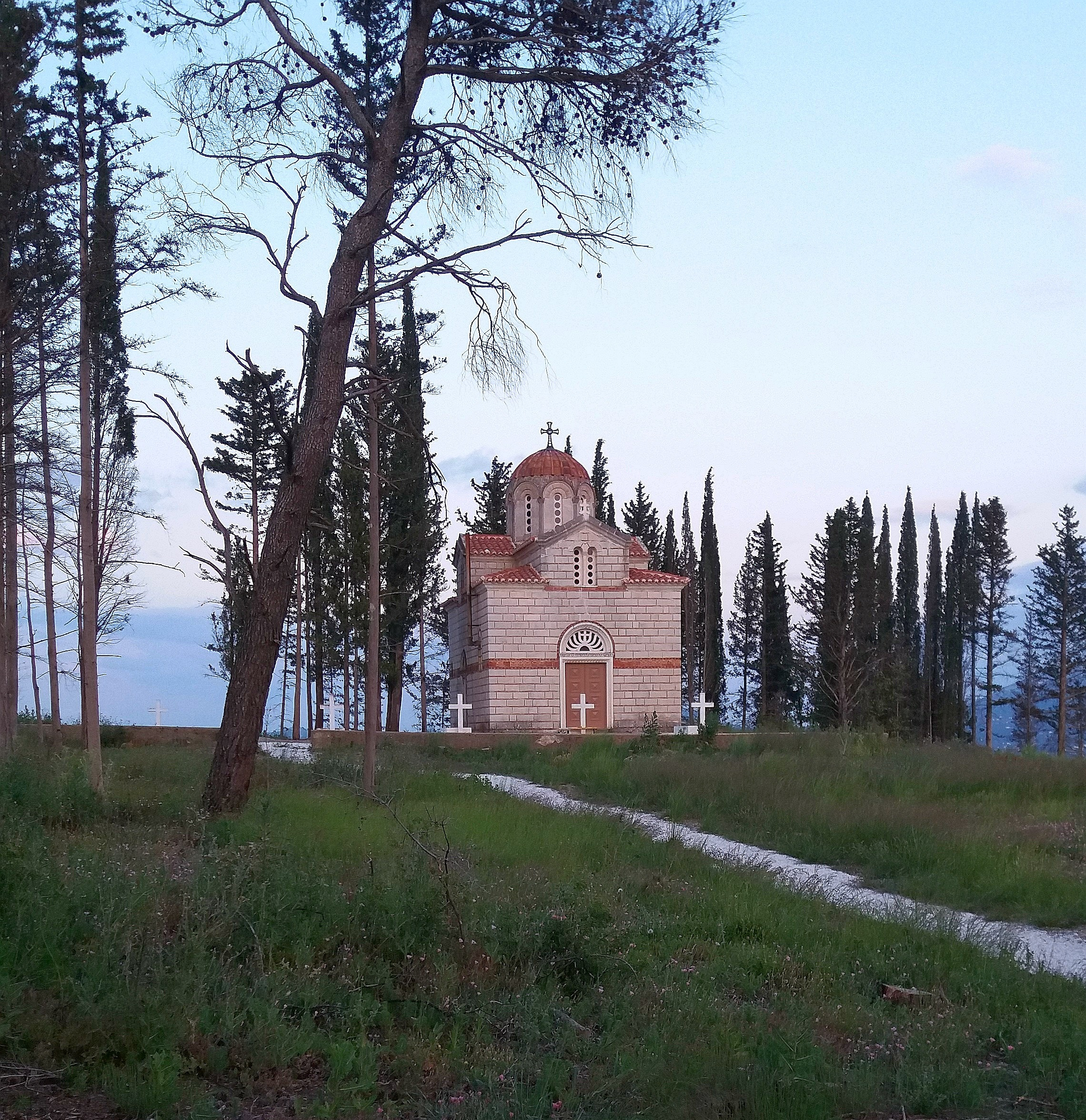
Resurrection Church at Tatoi Royal Cemetery

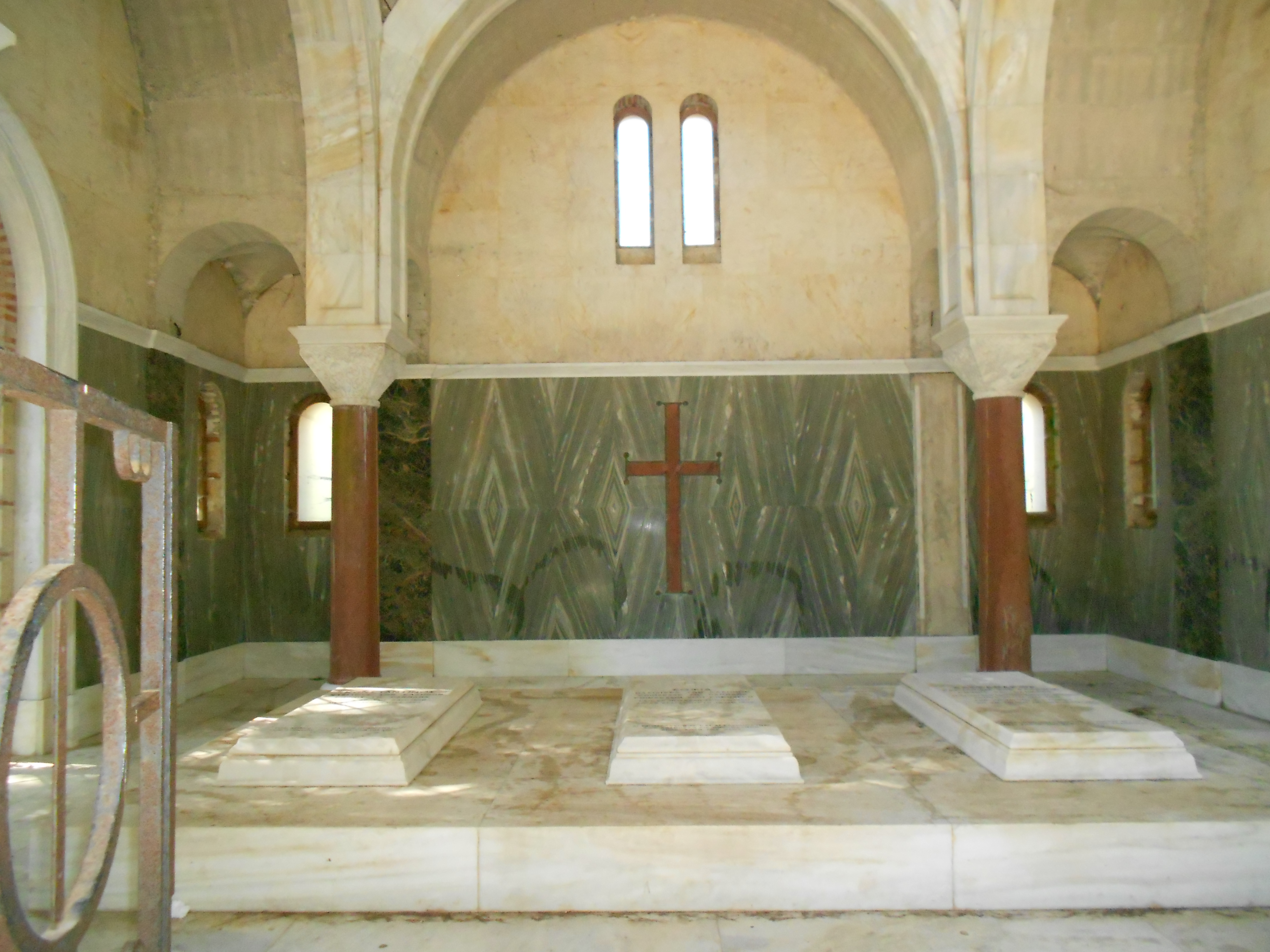
Mausoleum at Tatoi Royal Cemetery with the tombs of Constantine I, Sophia of Prussia and Alexander

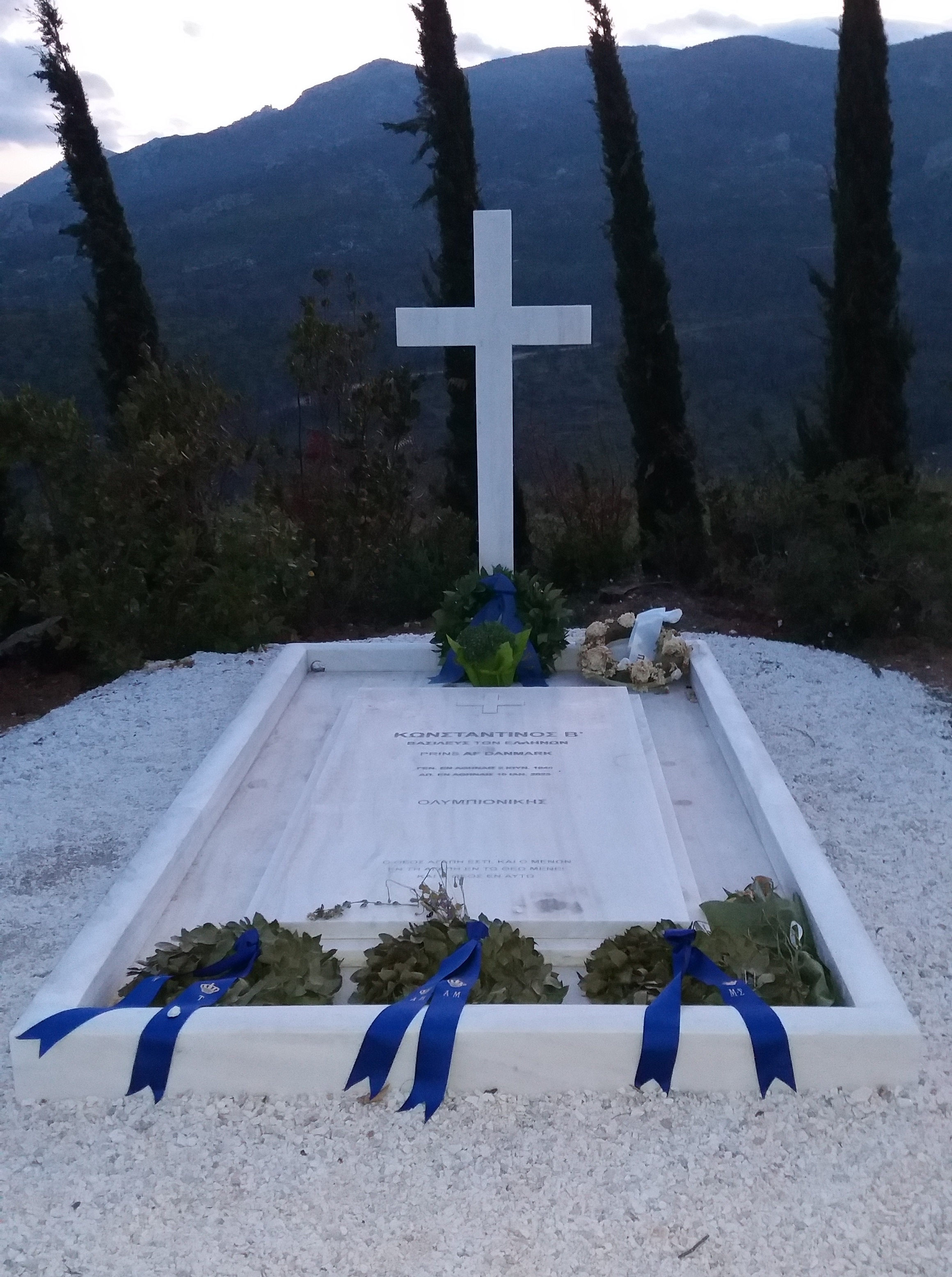
Tomb of King Constantine II

Tatoi Royal Cemetery is a private cemetery located on the south end of the estate in a large wooded area.

Buried in the Tatoi Royal Cemetery are:

1. Princess Olga of Greece and Denmark (1880–1880) – (daughter of George I of Greece)
2. Princess Alexandra of Greece and Denmark, Grand Duchess Alexandra Georgievna of Russia (1870–1891) – (daughter of George I of Greece)
3. George I of Greece (1845–1913)
4. Alexander of Greece (1893–1920)
5. Constantine I of Greece (1868–1923)
6. Grand Duchess Olga Constantinovna of Russia, Queen of Greece (1851–1926) – (wife of George I of Greece)
7. Princess Sophia of Prussia, Queen of Greece (1870–1932) – (wife of Constantine I of Greece)
8. Prince Nicholas of Greece and Denmark (1872–1938) – (son of George I of Greece)
9. Prince Christopher of Greece and Denmark (1888–1940) – (son of George I of Greece)
10. Princess Maria of Greece and Denmark, Grand Duchess Maria Georgievna of Russia (1876–1940) – (daughter of George I of Greece
11. Prince Andrew of Greece and Denmark (1882–1944) – (son of George I of Greece
12. George II of Greece (1890–1947)
13. Princess Françoise of Orléans, Princess Christopher of Greece and Denmark (1902–1953)
14. Grand Duchess Elena Vladimirovna of Russia, Princess Nicholas of Greece and Denmark (1882–1957)
15. Prince George of Greece and Denmark (1869–1957) – (son of George I of Greece)
16. Princess Marie Bonaparte, Princess George of Greece and Denmark (1882–1962)
17. Paul of Greece (1901–1964)
18. Aspasia Manos, Princess Alexander of Greece and Denmark (1896–1972)
19. Princess Frederica of Hanover, Queen of Greece (1917–1981) – (wife of Paul of Greece)
20. Princess Katherine of Greece and Denmark, Lady Katherine Brandram (1913–2007) – (daughter of Constantine I of Greece)
21. Constantine II of Greece (1940–2023)
22. Prince Michael of Greece and Denmark (1939–2024) – (son of Prince Christopher of Greece and Denmark)
23. Princess Irene of Greece and Denmark (1942–2026) – (daughter of Paul of Greece)

A mausoleum was built to house the bodies of Constantine I, Sophia and Alexander, seen in the image above. The remaining members are buried in tombs with crosses near the Resurrection Church.

Princess Alexandra of Greece and Denmark, Queen of Yugoslavia (1921–1993) was buried here from 1993 until 2013, when her remains were exhumed and returned to Serbia, where they were reburied at Oplenac in 2013.

== Climate ==
Tatoi has a hot-summer Mediterranean climate (Csa) with hot, dry summers and cool, rainy winters. The lowest temperature ever recorded is −8.9 °C (16.0 °F) on 9 January 2019.

Climate data for Tatoi, 235 m asl (1956-2010)
Month	Jan	Feb	Mar	Apr	May	Jun	Jul	Aug	Sep	Oct	Nov	Dec	Year
Mean daily maximum °C (°F)	11.7 (53.1)	12.5 (54.5)	14.9 (58.8)	19.4 (66.9)	25.0 (77.0)	29.9 (85.8)	32.1 (89.8)	31.9 (89.4)	27.9 (82.2)	22.4 (72.3)	17.5 (63.5)	13.2 (55.8)	21.5 (70.8)
Mean daily minimum °C (°F)	3.4 (38.1)	3.6 (38.5)	5.1 (41.2)	7.9 (46.2)	12.1 (53.8)	16.5 (61.7)	19.5 (67.1)	19.6 (67.3)	15.8 (60.4)	12.0 (53.6)	8.0 (46.4)	5.1 (41.2)	10.7 (51.3)
Average precipitation mm (inches)	67.5 (2.66)	50.9 (2.00)	49.7 (1.96)	24.6 (0.97)	23.2 (0.91)	10.3 (0.41)	10.9 (0.43)	5.5 (0.22)	19.2 (0.76)	51.3 (2.02)	59.2 (2.33)	79.7 (3.14)	452 (17.81)
Source: Hellenic National Meteorological Service

=== European temperature record ===
Tatoi was until 2021 one of the areas in the Athens Metropolitan Area (the other one was Elefsina) which held the record of the highest ever officially recorded temperature in Europe for 44 years with a reading of 48.0 °C (118.4 °F) on 10 July 1977.

== Bibliography ==
- Kardamitsi-Adami, Maro (2009). Palaces in Greece. Melissa Books. ISBN 978-960-204-289-2.
- Kostas M. Stamatopoloulos, The Chronicle of Tatoi, Kapon Editions, Athens, 2015
- Kostas M. Stamatopoloulos, Tatoi: Tour In Time And Space, Kapon Editions, Athens, 2015
- Symboulidis, Haris (15 February 2020). "Οι Απάχηδες Των Αθηνών" [The Apachis of Athens] (in Greek). Athens, Greece: Avopolis. Archived from the original on 23 March 2023.

== Sources ==
- Van der Kiste, John (1994). Kings of the Hellenes: The Greek Kings, 1863–1974. Dover, New Hampshire and Stroud, Gloucestershire: Sutton Publishing. ISBN 0-7509-0525-5.
