= Prince Michael of Greece and Denmark =

Greek royal, historian and author (1939–2024)

Prince Michael
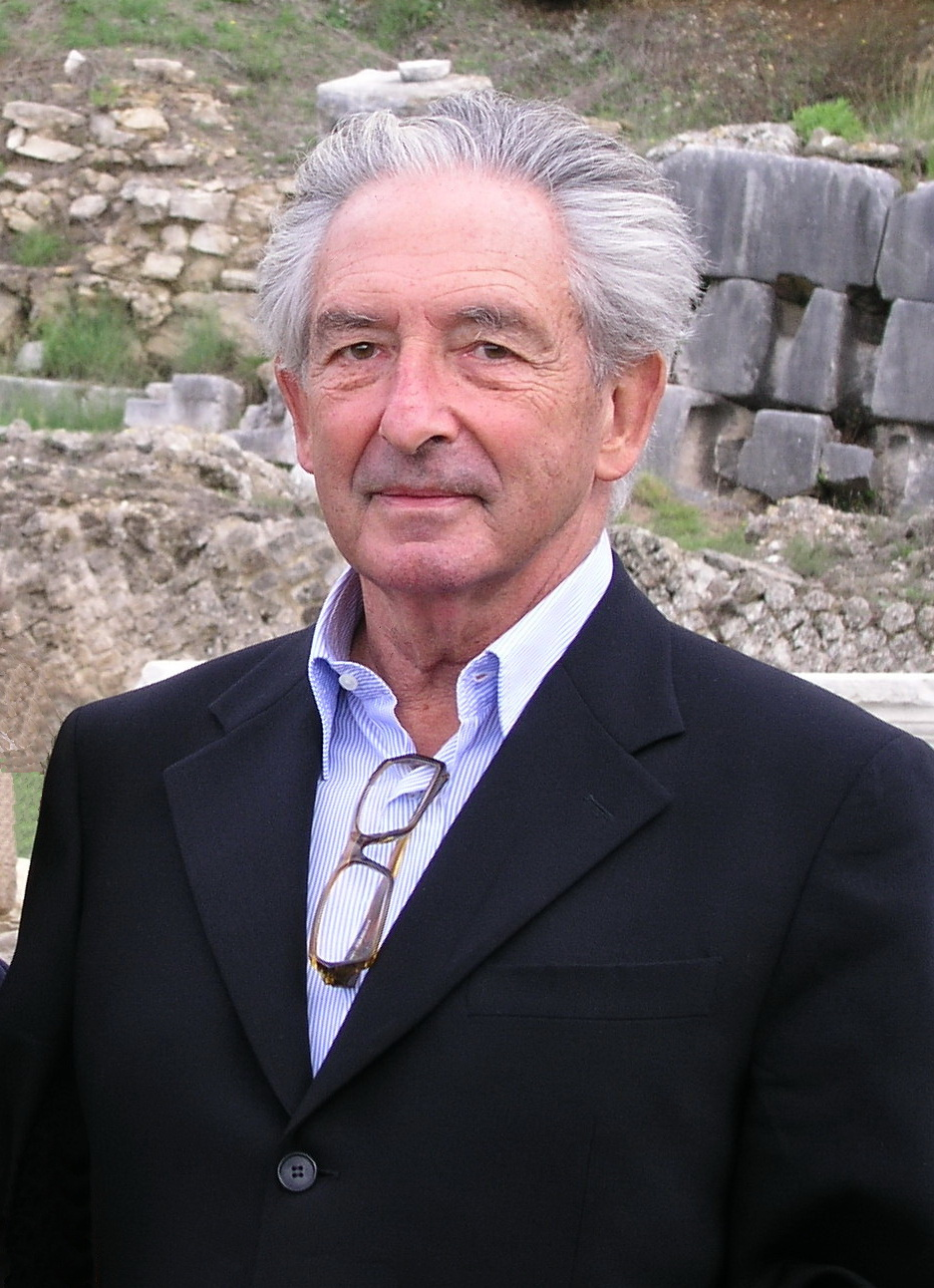
- Prince Michael in 2008
- Born: Prince Michael of Greece and Denmark; 7 January 1939; Rome, Italy
- Died: 28 July 2024 (aged 85); Athens, Greece
- Burial: 1 August 2024; Royal Cemetery, Tatoi Palace, Greece
- Spouse: Marina Karella (m. 1965)
- Issue: Princess Alexandra; Princess Olga, Duchess of Aosta
- Other names: Μισέλ ντε Γκρες; Μιχαήλ Ντε Γκρες
- House: Glücksburg
- Father: Prince Christopher of Greece and Denmark
- Mother: Princess Françoise d'Orléans
- Religion: Greek Orthodox

Prince Michael of Greece and Denmark (Greek: Μισέλ ντε Γκρες, romanized: Michel de Grèce; 7 January 1939 – 28 July 2024) was a Greek historian, author, and member of the Greek royal family. He wrote several historical books and biographies of Greek and other European figures, in addition to working as a contributing writer to Architectural Digest.

He was a first cousin, among others, of Kings George II of Greece, Paul of Greece, their sister, Queen Helen, Queen Mother of Romania, in addition to Prince Philip, Duke of Edinburgh and also of Prince Henri d'Orléans.

== Birth and family ==
Michael was born in Rome to Prince Christopher of Greece and Denmark (youngest son of King George I of Greece) and his second wife, Princess Françoise d'Orléans (daughter of the Orleanist claimant to the defunct French throne, Jean d'Orléans, Duke of Guise). His godparents were his two first cousins Queen Helen, Queen Mother of Romania and King George II of Greece (eldest children of his paternal uncle King Constantine I).

His father died in 1940, when Michael was a year old. His mother died in 1953, when Michael was 14, leaving him an orphan. Although a Greek prince, like many members of his dynasty he grew up largely abroad, sometimes in exile. As Europe marched into World War II, the infant Michael's family scattered: his mother's father, the Duke of Guise, left his residence of exile in Brussels, the Manoir d'Anjou, for their property at Larache, Morocco, in March 1939 where he died on 24 August, the Manoir having become the Belgian headquarters for Germany's invading Wehrmacht.

About eight months before her father's death, Françoise was widowed by the death of Prince Christopher, following an abscess of the lung, in Athens in January. She took Michael to join her mother's household in Larache where her elder sister, Princess Isabelle Murat and her family, had also taken refuge from Europe. Their brother, Henri, Count of Paris, who succeeded his own father as head of the Orleanist monarchist movement, sent for his wife and children to come from their relatives in Brazil, and by the spring of 1941 they too were settled in Spanish Morocco (still being banned from the French sector), near Casablanca, in a small house without electricity that was named Oued Akreech in the town of Rabat. Michael lived his early childhood years on the African continent in the midst of his mother's family. Later, they also spent time in Spain.

By the time Michael's mother died in Paris in early 1953, France had repealed the law of banishment against its former ruling families (24 June 1950) and the Comte de Paris had taken up residence in the capital. When, in August 1953, Monseigneur moved the Comtesse and their children to a new estate, the Manoir du Cœur Volant in Louveciennes, Michael joined the couple and their four eldest children in the main building, while the seven younger children and their governesses occupied an annex given the name la maison de Blanche Neige ("Snow White's cottage"). Henceforth, Michael was given into the care of his uncle and raised with his Orléans cousins.

Michael later acknowledged that his uncle had been a poor manager of his ward's assets, but maintained that there was no malfeasance or attempt to conceal losses. He would also comment that, allegations to the contrary notwithstanding, his uncle's notorious relationship with his assistant Monique Friesz in his later years, during which substantial assets were presumed to have been consumed or diverted, did not reflect manipulation on her part so much as the desire of the Comte de Paris for companionship when he chose to isolate himself from the society, culture and luxury to which he had previously been accustomed.

Following the death of his second cousin, Christian Ludwig Gustav Fritz Castenskiold (1926–2024), on 16 July 2024, he became the last surviving great-grandchild of King Christian IX of Denmark.

== Activities ==
Michael studied political science in Paris. He then re-patriated to Greece for military duty, serving for four years in the Cavalry-Tank Corps, in Athens and Thessaloniki. He inherited from his mother a half-interest in the domain of the Nouvion-en-Thiérache, once the seat of the Dukes of Guise, from whom the Bourbon-Orléans inherited the vast property, which included a grand château and a petit château, in Aisne. The Comte de Paris owned the other half of the Nouvion. He and Michael sold the grand château in 1980 to the city of Roubaix, which subsequently became a conference center for environmental studies, while the petit château was sold in 1986 to the local government of Nouvion.

== List of works ==
Having watched his mother observe a family tradition by igniting what he called a kind of auto-da-fé in which she burned his late father's papers and memorabilia following the sale of his villa in Rome after the war, Prince Michael grew up to become a biographer and historian. He penned several biographies about members of ruling dynasties, those about contemporaries often including accounts and anecdotes attributed to his royal relatives. He also authored novels about historical royalty, distinguished for meticulous detail.

- Les rois les dynasties qui ont fait l'histoire; les dynasties francaises; les Valois, les Bourbons, les Orléans, les Bonaparte (1972)
- Quand Napoléon faisait trembler l'Europe (1978)
- Louis XIV, the other side of the sun (1984)
- Rani, La femme sacrée, a novelised but well documented biography of the Rani of Jhansi (French: 1984; English: 2013) ISBN 978-2266023610
- The royal house of Greece (1988), illustrated album
- Συρία : ελληνικοί απόηχοι (1993)
- Living with ghosts (1996)
- Nicholas and Alexandra: the family albums (1996)
- The Empress of Farewells: the story of Charlotte, Empress of Mexico (1998)
- The White Night of St. Petersburg (2000), novelised biography of Grand Duke Nicholas Kostantinovich
- Jewels of the Tsars (2006), illustrated album
- Le Rajah Bourbon (2007), concerning the Bourbons of India
- Voices of light (2012), illustrated by Marina Karella ISBN 978-2916123608

== Marriage and issue ==
Michael married Marina Karella (born 17 July 1940) on 7 February 1965 in Athens, daughter of Theódoros Karellas and Elli Chalikiopoulos. Marina is a Greek artist and sculptor of international reputation whose work has often been exhibited in Athens, Paris and New York. The marriage was held at the Royal Palace in Athens. This was a non-dynastic marriage, which obtained the legally required authorisation of King Constantine II only after Michael renounced all rights of succession to the Greek throne for himself and his descendants.

The couple have two daughters:

- Princess Alexandra Elli Francisca Maria of Greece (born 15 October 1968), married to Nicolas Mirzayantz on 27 June 1998. They have two sons: Tigran (born 16 August 2000) and Darius (born April 2002).
- Princess Olga Isabelle of Greece (born 17 November 1971), married in 2008 to her second cousin Prince Aimone of Savoy, 6th Duke of Aosta, a member of the former royal family of Italy. Aimone and Olga are the parents of two sons, Prince Umberto (born 7 March 2009) and Prince Amedeo (born 2011), and of a daughter, Princess Isabella (born 2012).

== Death ==
Prince Michael died at a hospital in Athens, on 28 July 2024, at the age of 85. He was the last surviving grandchild of George I of Greece. He has lineage to the House of Bourbon through his mother's side of the family and the last surviving great-grandchild of Christian IX of Denmark.

His funeral was held on 1 August 2024 at the Church of Saint Theodores in the First Cemetery of Athens, followed by burial in the Tatoi Royal Cemetery. His immediate family – Marina Karella, Princess Alexandra of Greece, Nicolas Mirzayantz, Princess Olga, Duchess of Aosta, Prince Aimone, Duke of Aosta, and his grandchildren – attended the funeral. Other dignitaries included Queen Anne-Marie of Greece, Pavlos, Crown Prince of Greece, Marie-Chantal, Crown Princess of Greece, Princess Alexia of Greece and Denmark, Prince Nikolaos of Greece and Denmark, Princess Theodora of Greece and Denmark, Prince Philippos of Greece and Denmark, Queen Sofía of Spain, Princess Irene of Greece and Denmark, Princess Anne, Duchess of Calabria, Princess Mafalda of Savoy-Aosta, Princess Bianca of Savoy-Aosta and Mareva Grabowski, the wife of the Prime Minister of Greece, Kyriakos Mitsotakis.

== Titles, styles, honours and arms ==
Styles of Prince Michael of Greece and Denmark
- Reference style: His Royal Highness
- Spoken style: Your Royal Highness

=== Titles and styles ===
- 7 January 1939 – 28 July 2024: His Royal Highness Prince Michael of Greece and Denmark.

==== Foreign honours ====
- Denmark: Knight of the Order of the Elephant (R.E., 11 September 1964).
- France: Commander of the Order of Arts and Letters
- Empire of Iran: Recipient of the Commemorative Medal of the 2500th Anniversary of the founding of the Persian Empire (14 October 1971).

== Ancestry ==
Ancestors of Prince Michael of Greece and Denmark

8. Christian IX of Denmark
4. George I of Greece
9. Princess Louise of Hesse-Kassel
2. Prince Christopher of Greece and Denmark
10. Grand Duke Konstantin Nikolayevich of Russia
5. Grand Duchess Olga Constantinovna of Russia
11. Princess Alexandra of Saxe-Altenburg
1. Prince Michael of Greece and Denmark
12. Prince Robert, Duke of Chartres
6. Prince Jean, Duke of Guise
13. Princess Françoise of Orléans
3. Princess Françoise of Orléans
14. Prince Philippe, Count of Paris
7. Princess Isabelle of Orléans
15. Princess Marie Isabelle of Orléans

== See also ==
- List of historians
