= Princess Olga of Savoy-Aosta =

Princess Olga
- Duchess of Aosta
- Born: Princess Olga of Greece; 11 November 1971 (age 55); Athens, Greece
- Spouse: Prince Aimone, Duke of Aosta (m. 2008)
- Issue: Prince Umberto; Prince Amedeo; Princess Isabella
Names
- Olga Isabelle
- House: Glücksburg
- Father: Prince Michael of Greece and Denmark
- Mother: Marina Karella

Coat of arms of Princess Olga, Duchess of Aosta

Princess Olga Isabelle of Savoy-Aosta, Duchess of Aosta (née Princess Olga of Greece; Greek: Πριγκίπισσα Όλγα της Ελλάδας; born 11 November 1971), is the younger daughter of author Prince Michael of Greece and Denmark and Marina Karella, an artist and daughter of the Greek business magnate Theódoros Karéllas. Olga is married to her second cousin Prince Aimone, Duke of Aosta.

== Early life ==
Princess Olga was born on 11 November 1971 in Athens, Greece. She is the younger sister of Princess Alexandra and grew up in Paris and New York, spending summers at the family's island retreat at Patmos, Greece. She chose to attend boarding school in England, studied history in Rome, and is a graduate of Princeton University. She also holds a degree from Columbia University's Graduate School of Architecture, Planning and Preservation. Although Olga worked for a while in interior decoration, she went to Panama to photograph and study phalaena. Later, as a lepidopterist, she helped to set up and then worked in the Liquid Jungle Lab in Panama in co-operation with the Smithsonian Tropical Research Institute and the Woods Hole Oceanographic Institution. She is also a journalist and filmmaker.

As Princess Olga's parents' marriage is morganatic, and therefore non-dynastic, she is a Greek princess by birth but not a Danish princess, used the style Her Highness instead of Her Royal Highness (until her marriage), and is excluded from the line of succession to the former Greek throne.

== Engagement, marriage and children ==
Olga's engagement to Prince Aimone of Savoy - Aosta, son of Amedeo, 5th Duke of Aosta, was announced in May 2005. Aimone and Olga are second cousins; both being great-grandchildren of the French pretender Jean d'Orléans, duc de Guise. They are also second cousins once removed as George I of Greece is Aimone's great-great-grandfather and Olga's great-grandfather. Olga's father, Prince Michael of Greece and Denmark, Aimone's paternal grandmother, Princess Irene, Duchess of Aosta (née Princess Irene of Greece and Denmark), and Prince Philip, Duke of Edinburgh (born Prince Philip of Greece and Denmark), were all first cousins.

The couple were married, after a three-year engagement, on 16 September 2008 at the Italian embassy in Moscow, the city in which Aimone was employed. Their religious marriage took place on 27 September at Patmos, where it was expected that the Patriarchal Exarch of Patmos, Archimandrite Andipas Nikitaras, would preside at the Church of the Evangelismos of the Virgin Mary at Pano Kambos, with a reception following on the site of a former school. Since the Second Vatican Council, marriages celebrated according to the rite of the Ecumenical Patriarchate of Constantinople, to which the exarchate belongs, may be recognized as canonically valid. A canonical dispensation was obtained from the Catholic Archbishop of Moscow, Monsignor Paolo Pezzi, who was the local Ordinary of prince Aimone.

On 7 March 2009, Princess Olga gave birth to a son named Umberto in Paris, France. On 24 May 2011 in Paris, Olga gave birth to another son, named Amedeo Michele. A day after his birth, Amedeo was granted the title Duke of the Abruzzi by his paternal grandfather. On 14 December 2012, Olga gave birth to a baby daughter, Isabella Vita Marina, in Paris, France.
