= Prince Christopher of Greece and Denmark =

Greek and Danish prince (1888–1940)

Prince Christopher
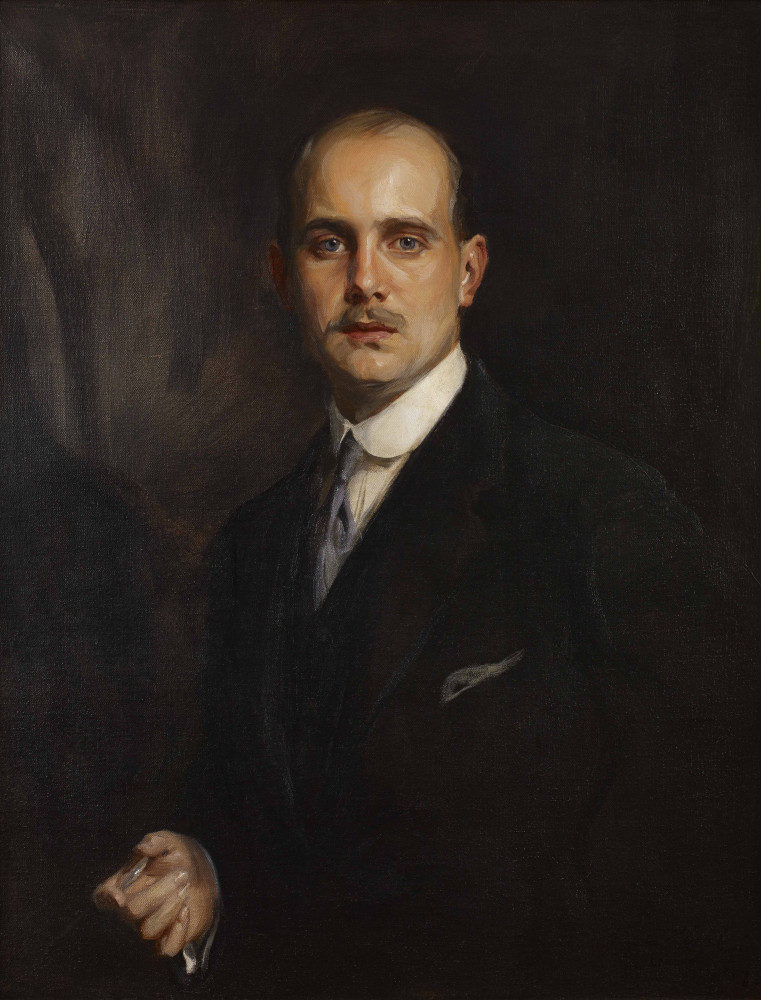
- Portrait by Philip de László, 1919
- Born: 10 August 1888; Pavlovsk, Saint Petersburg, Russia
- Died: 21 January 1940 (aged 51); Athens, Greece
- Burial: Royal Cemetery, Tatoi Palace, Greece
- Spouses: Nancy Stewart Worthington Leeds (m. 1920; died 1923) Princess Françoise of Orléans (m. 1929)
- Issue: Prince Michael
- House: Glücksburg
- Father: George I of Greece
- Mother: Olga Constantinovna of Russia

Prince Christopher of Greece and Denmark (Greek: Χριστόφορος, romanized: Christóphoros; 10 August 1888 – 21 January 1940) was the fifth and youngest son and youngest child of King George I of Greece, belonging to a dynasty which mounted and lost the throne of Greece several times during his lifetime. Much of his life was spent living abroad.

== Family background ==
Christopher was born at Pavlovsk, Imperial Russia, son of King George I of Greece and his wife Queen Olga, a Russian grand duchess by birth. He was the youngest of their eight children, being twenty years younger than their oldest child, Constantine. He was called "Christo" in the family. His older brothers were future King Constantine I, George, Nicholas and Andrew.

Christopher, like his siblings, was a polyglot, speaking Greek, German, English, Danish, Russian, French, and Italian. The siblings spoke Greek to one another, and used English with their parents. The parents, however, spoke German to each other.

The Greek royal family maintained close relations with the Danish royal family, to which they also officially belonged. The Hellenic royal line was a cadet branch of the Schleswig-Holstein-Sonderburg-Glücksburg dynasty which had mounted the throne of Greece in 1863.

== Early adulthood ==
When Christopher came of age he joined the Hellenic Navy, although apparently he would rather have studied the piano. While a young man, he was apparently offered no fewer than three different thrones - those of Portugal, Lithuania, and Albania - but he declined them all, as he did not wish the stress of royal duties.

He was briefly engaged to Princess Alexandra, 2nd Duchess of Fife in about 1910 (Alexandra's mother, Princess Louise, Duchess of Fife, was a daughter of King Edward VII and Queen Alexandra of the United Kingdom, herself an older sister of George I of Greece, Christopher's father). The engagement was terminated when her disapproving father, Alexander Duff, 1st Duke of Fife, learned of the liaison.

== First marriage ==
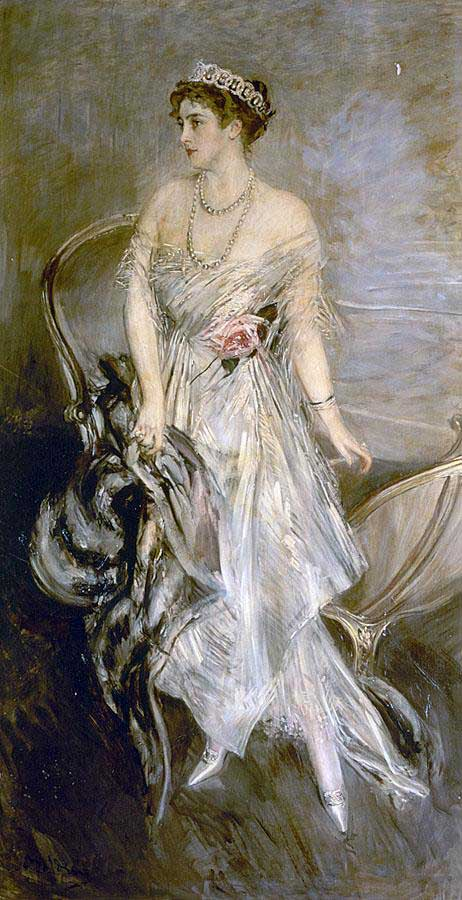
Princess Anastasia of Greece and Denmark, the former Nancy Leeds, by Giovanni Boldini

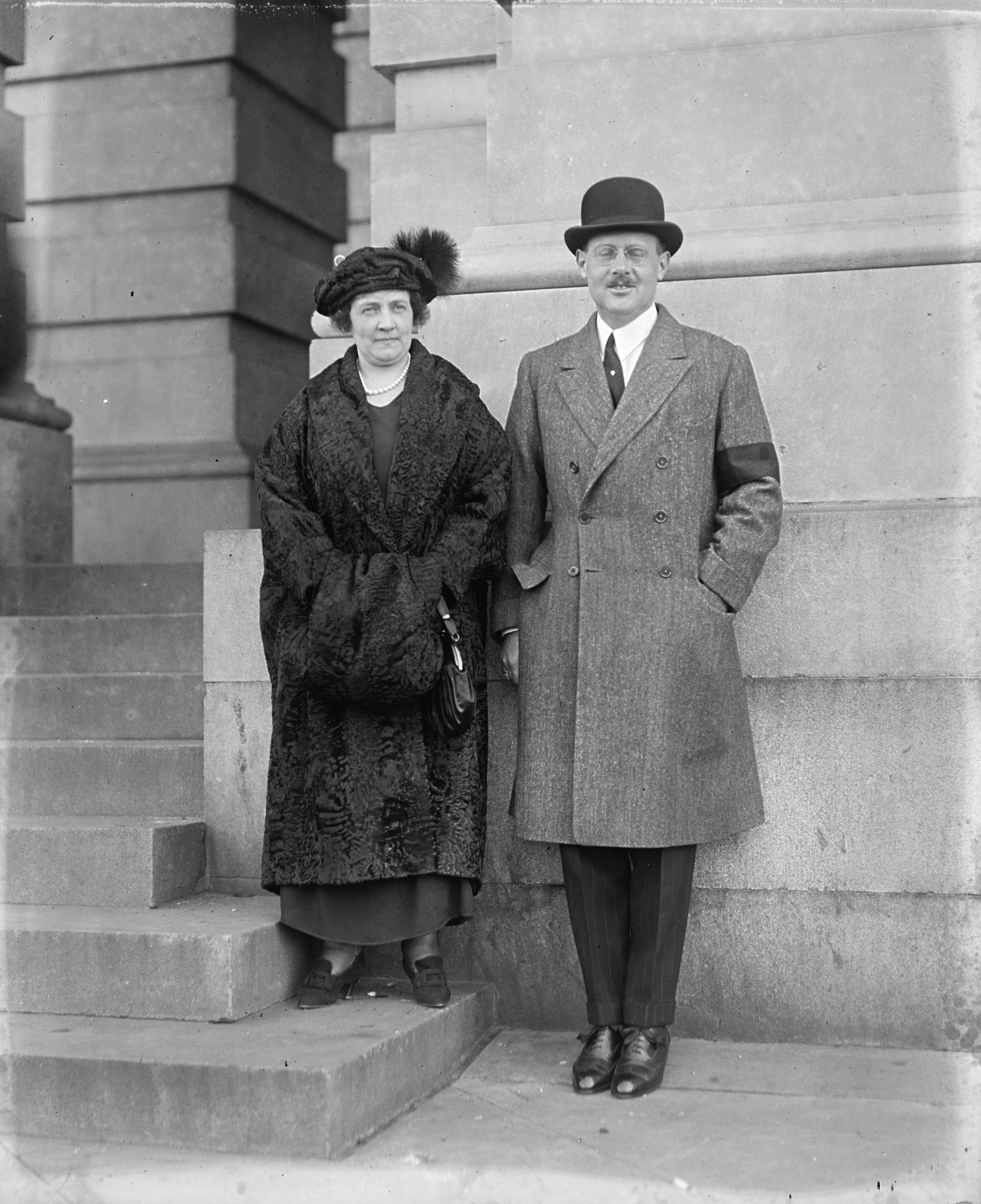
Prince Christopher of Greece and Denmark and his first wife, Princess Anastasia of Greece and Denmark

On 1 January 1920, Christopher married a very wealthy American widow, Nonnie May "Nancy" Stewart Worthington Leeds, at Vevey, Switzerland. His bride, a once-divorced and once-widowed commoner at least a decade older than the prince, was nonetheless recognised as Christopher's dynastic wife by his family (at the time of the engagement and wedding, the Greek royal family lived frugally in exile, and as Christopher was last in the dynasty's order of succession, any children he fathered would not impact the succession rights of other Greek dynasts). Her fortune, estimated in the tens of millions of dollars, was inherited from her second husband, a tin millionaire, and substantially eased the Greek royal family's exile during the 1920s. The wedding followed a six-year engagement while the royal court-in-exile negotiated the terms and arrangements of the marriage.

Shortly after their marriage, Princess Anastasia developed cancer, and died in London on 29 August 1923, leaving no children from this marriage. Prince Christopher did, however, have a stepson, William Bateman Leeds Jr (1902–1971), who had, in 1921, married Princess Xenia Georgievna of Russia. She was Christopher's niece through his elder sister, Princess Marie of Greece.

== Second marriage and family ==
Prince Christopher later remarried; his second wife was Princess Françoise of Orléans (25 December 1902 – 25 February 1953).

Françoise was a daughter of Prince Jean, Duke of Guise, Orléanist pretender to the throne of France, by his wife/first cousin, Isabelle d'Orléans. Isabelle was, in turn, a daughter of Prince Philippe, Count of Paris by his wife and first cousin, Infanta Isabel de Orléans y Borbon.

The couple were married in 1929 in Palermo, Italy; the civil ceremony was on 10 February, and the religious one on 11 February. They were childless for a decade, then one child was born to Françoise: Prince Michael of Greece and Denmark was born in Rome in 1939, shortly before Prince Christopher's death.

== Opinion on Anna Anderson ==
In 1927, Prince Christopher paid a visit to the Long Island home of William and Xenia Leeds, respectively his stepson and niece. Xenia had taken an interest in the strange case of a woman, Anna Anderson, who claimed to be Grand Duchess Anastasia Nikolaevna of Russia, the youngest daughter of the last Tsar of Russia, Nicholas II.

As Prince Christopher explained, "That was her story, and, fantastic as it was, there were many who believed then − and still believe − in her, among them one or two members of the Imperial Family." He went on, "Dozens of people who had known the Grand Duchess Anastasia were brought to see the girl in the hope that they might be able to identify her, but none of them could come to any definite conclusion." Prince Christopher described her: "In the first place she was unable to speak Russian, which the Grand Duchess Anastasia, like all the Czar's children, had talked fluently − and would only converse in German."

Summing up, he said of her, "The poor girl was a pathetic figure in her loneliness and ill health, and it was comprehensible enough that many of those around her let their sympathy over-rule their logic.... She was unable to recognise people who the Grand Duchess Anastasia had known intimately, and her descriptions of rooms in the different palaces and of other scenes familiar to any of the Imperial Family were often inaccurate."

== Opinion on monarchy ==
Prince Christopher recorded his thoughts on monarchy and those aspiring to it: "Nothing under the sun would induce me to accept a Kingdom. A crown is too heavy a thing to be put on lightly. It has to be worn by those born to that destiny, but that any man should willingly take on the responsibility, not being constrained by duty to do so, passes my comprehension."

== Death ==
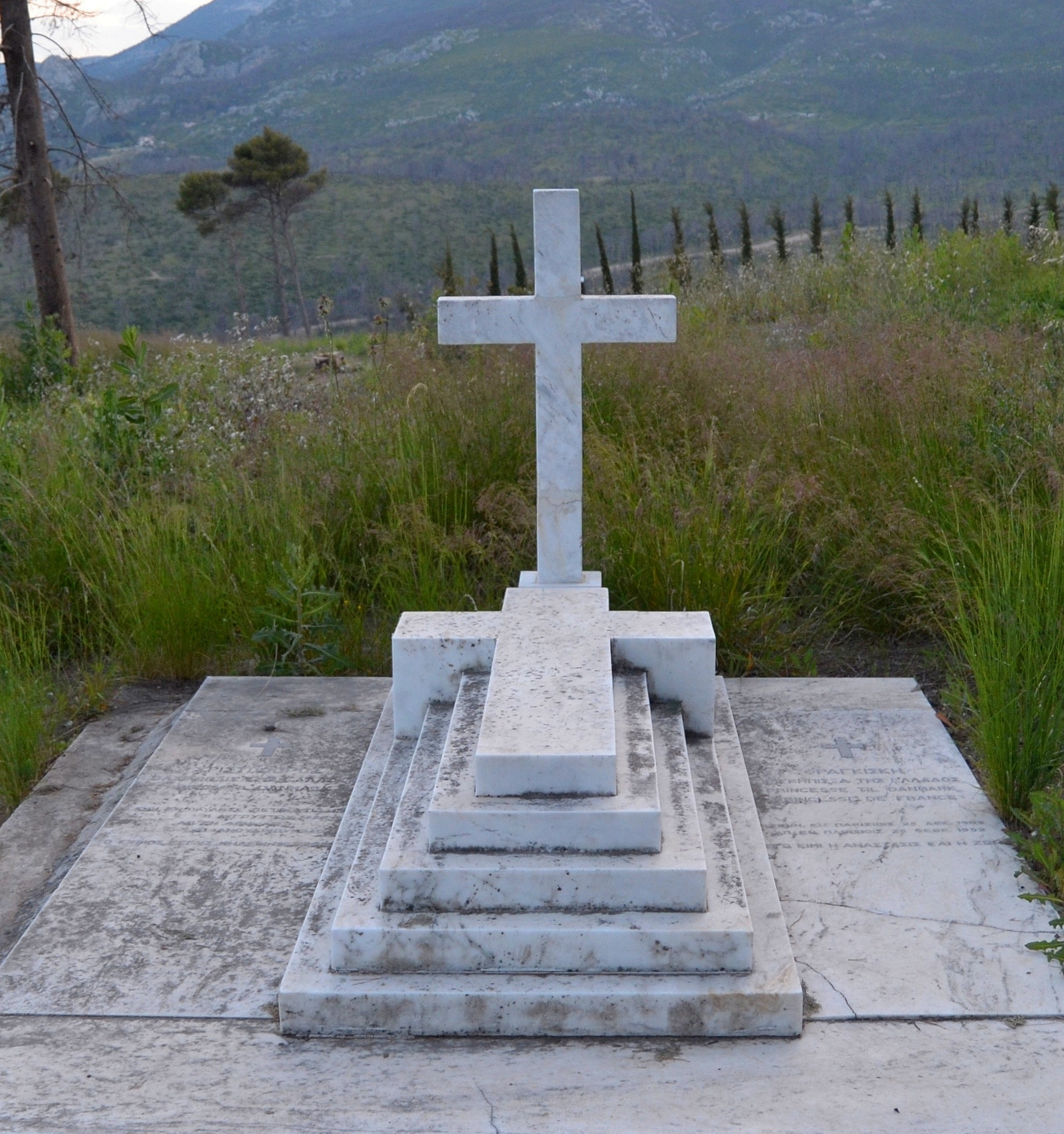
Tomb of Prince Christopher (left) and Princess Françoise (right) - Tatoi Royal Cemetery

Prince Christopher of Greece died in Athens on 21 January 1940, aged 51.

== Ancestry ==
Ancestors of Prince Christopher of Greece and Denmark

8. Friedrich Wilhelm, Duke of Schleswig-Holstein-Sonderburg-Glücksburg
4. Christian IX of Denmark
9. Princess Louise Caroline of Hesse-Kassel
2. George I of Greece
10. Prince William of Hesse-Kassel
5. Princess Louise of Hesse-Kassel
11. Princess Louise Charlotte of Denmark
1. Prince Christopher of Greece and Denmark
12. Nicholas I of Russia
6. Grand Duke Constantine Nikolaevich of Russia
13. Princess Charlotte of Prussia
3. Grand Duchess Olga Constantinovna of Russia
14. Joseph, Duke of Saxe-Altenburg
7. Princess Alexandra of Saxe-Altenburg
15. Duchess Amelia of Württemberg

== Books ==
- Greece, Christopher, Prince (1938). Memoirs of HRH Prince Christopher of Greece. London: The Right Book Club.
- Curley, Walter (1975). Monarchs In Waiting. London: Hutchinson & Co (Publishers) Ltd. ISBN 0-09-122310-5.
- Louda, Jiri; Michael Maclagan (1981). Lines of Succession. London: Orbis Publishing. ISBN 0-85613-276-4.
