= Marina Karella =

Greek artist (born 1940)

Marína
- Consort of Prince Michael of Greece and Denmark
- Born: 17 July 1940 (age 86); Athens, Greece
- Spouse: Prince Michael of Greece and Denmark (m. 1965; died 2024)
- Issue: Princess Alexandra, Mrs. Mirzayantz; Princess Olga, Duchess of Aosta
- Father: Theódoros Karéllas
- Mother: Élli Chalikiopoúlou
- Occupation: artist

Marína Karélla (Greek: Μαρίνα Καρέλλα; born 17 July 1940) is a Greek artist and the widow of Prince Michael of Greece and Denmark.

== Life ==
Marína Karélla was born in Athens on 17 July 1940 to industrialist Theódoros Karéllas and Élli Chalikiopoúlou.

In 1960, Karélla was enrolled at the Athens School of Fine Arts, where she studied till 1963. She then continued with her studies at the École des Beaux-Arts in Paris and the Academy of Fine Arts in Salzburg, having also trained under notable artists like Oskar Kokoška and Giánnis Tsaroúchis.

On 7 February 1965, she married Prince Michael of Greece and Denmark at the Royal Palace in Athens. However, because the marriage was considered non-dynastic, she did not automatically acquire the title of 'Princess of Greece and Denmark' nor the style of 'Her Royal Highness', but is instead referred to as Marína, Consort of Prince Michael of Greece and Denmark.

At the start of the Greek junta (1967–1974), Marina and Michael of Greece were the only members of the Greek royal family granted permission to remain living in their country. However, the couple chose to leave Greece in 1972 and settled in Paris, France with their two daughters.

The couple has two daughters: Princess Alexándra (born 15 October 1968 in Athens) and Princess Olga of Greece (born 17 November 1971 in Athens).

== Work ==
Karélla began her career in 1966, when she presented her first exhibition of paintings at the Festival of Two Worlds in Italy. Her early career was heavily inspired by themes related to Greece. In the '70s she exhibited her White Paintings at Gallery Ioulas, which are now considered among the most famous pieces of her work. The following decade, Karella put up multiple exhibitions at the Earl McGrath Gallery in New York, which also included collaborations with Jack Pierson. Throughout the '90s her work was featured in multiple publications, including The New Yorker and New York (magazine).

During her career Karélla has put up a number of exhibitions in various cities around the world, such as Paris, Athens, New York, Los Angeles, Brussels, Rome, and London, while many of her works are also hosted in many museums and institutions. In 2005, a retrospective exhibition of her work was organized at the Benaki Museum in Athens.

In more recent years, Karélla has increasingly ventured into philanthropic works and is currently the founder and president of Eliza, a non-profit society that works towards the prevention of cruelty against children.
