= George I of Greece =

King of Greece from 1863 to 1913

George I
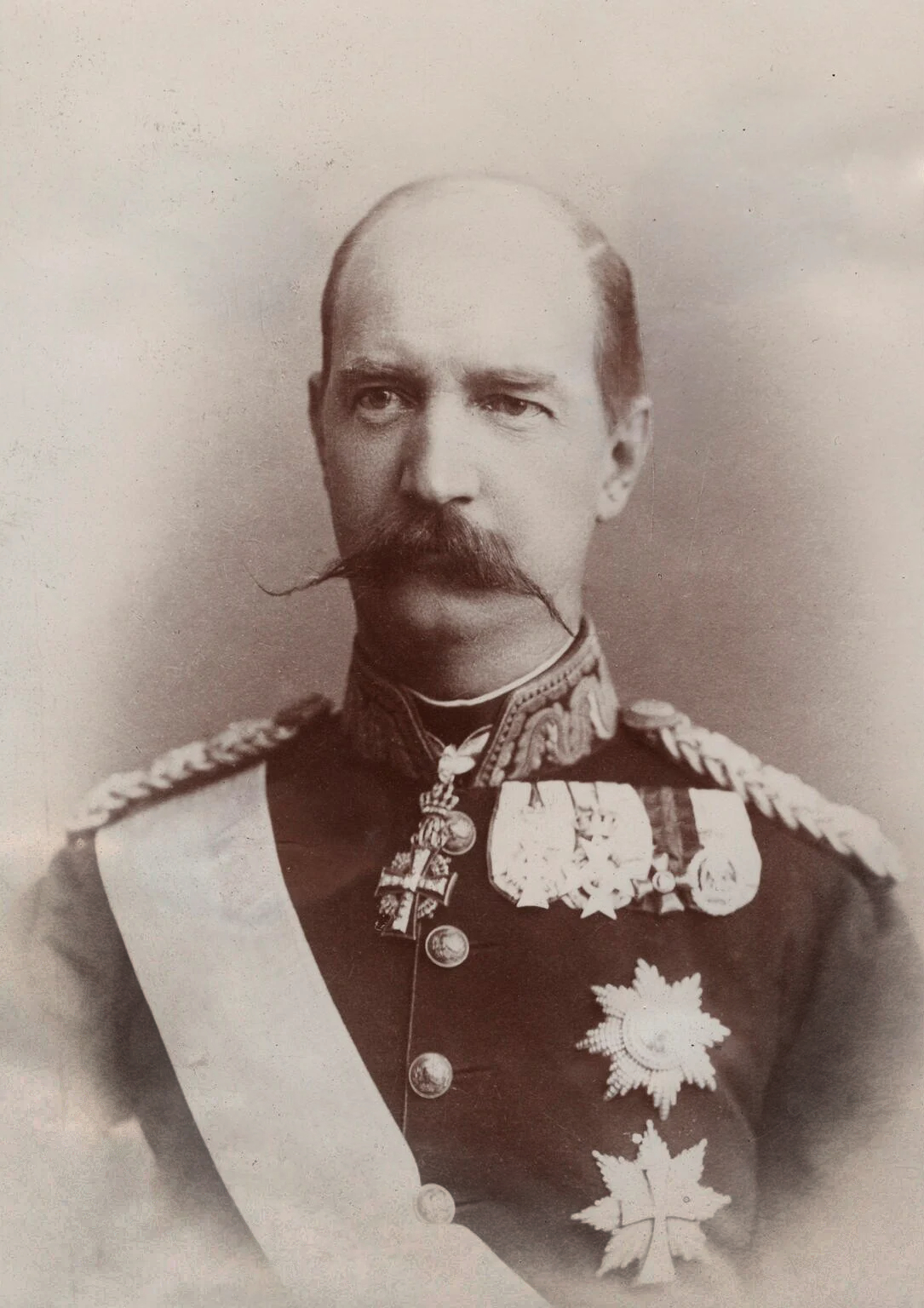
- Formal portrait, c. 1912

King of the Hellenes
- Reign: 30 March 1863 – 18 March 1913 (Note: Throughout George's lifetime, Greece used the Old Style Julian calendar. Unless otherwise indicated, all dates in this article are in the New Style Gregorian calendar.)
- Enthronement: 6 June 1863
- Predecessor: Otto (as King of Greece)
- Successor: Constantine I
- Born: Prince William of Schleswig-Holstein-Sonderburg-Glücksburg; 24 December 1845; Copenhagen, Denmark
- Died: 18 March 1913 (aged 67); Thessaloniki (Note: At the time of the King's assassination, Thessaloniki was an occupied Ottoman territory. The city was recognized as part of the Kingdom of Greece by the Treaty of Bucharest five months later.)
- Cause of death: Assassination
- Burial: Royal Cemetery, Tatoi Palace, Greece
- Spouse: Olga Constantinovna of Russia (m. 1867)
- Issue: Constantine I; Prince George; Princess Alexandra; Prince Nicholas; Princess Maria; Princess Olga; Prince Andrew; Prince Christopher
Names
- Christian William Ferdinand Adolf George
- Greek: Γεώργιος Αʹ (Geórgios I)
- House: Glücksburg
- Father: Christian IX of Denmark
- Mother: Louise of Hesse-Kassel

George I (Note: Greek: Γεώργιος Α΄, romanized: Geórgios I) (born Prince William of Schleswig-Holstein-Sonderburg-Glücksburg; (Note: Danish: Vilhelm) 24 December 1845 – 18 March 1913) was King of Greece from 30 March 1863 until his assassination on 18 March 1913. He was the first monarch of a Greek dynasty that ruled, with a few breaks, until the monarchy was abolished in 1973.

Originally a Danish prince, George was born in Copenhagen, and seemed destined for a career in the Royal Danish Navy. He was only 17 years old when he was elected king by the Greek National Assembly, which had deposed the unpopular King Otto. His nomination was both suggested and supported by the great powers: the United Kingdom of Great Britain and Ireland, the Second French Empire and the Russian Empire. He married Grand Duchess Olga Constantinovna of Russia in 1867. Two of his sisters, Alexandra and Dagmar, married into the British and Russian royal families. Edward VII of the United Kingdom and Alexander III of Russia were his brothers-in-law, and George V of the United Kingdom, Christian X of Denmark, Haakon VII of Norway, and Nicholas II of Russia were his nephews.

George's reign of almost 50 years (the longest in modern Greek history) was characterized by territorial gains as Greece established its place in pre-World War I Europe. Britain ceded the Ionian Islands peacefully in 1864, while Thessaly was annexed from the Ottoman Empire after the Russo-Turkish War (1877–1878). Greece was not always successful in its territorial ambitions; it was defeated in the Greco-Turkish War of 1897. During the First Balkan War, after Greek troops had captured much of Greek Macedonia and Epirus, George was assassinated in Thessaloniki.

== Family and early life ==
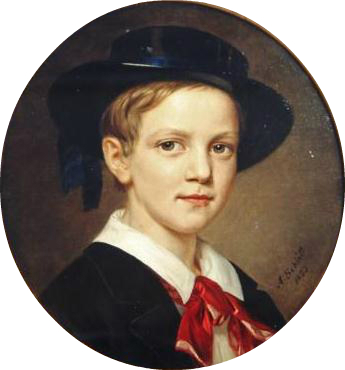
Portrait by August Schiøtt, 1853

George was born on 24 December 1845 at his parents' residence the Yellow Palace, an 18th-century town house at 18 Amaliegade, next to the Amalienborg Palace complex in Copenhagen. He was the second son and third child of Prince Christian of Schleswig-Holstein-Sonderburg-Glücksburg and Princess Louise of Hesse-Kassel. He was baptised with the names Christian William Ferdinand Adolph George, and until his accession in Greece, he was known as Prince William, the namesake of both his grandfathers, William, Duke of Schleswig-Holstein-Sonderburg-Glücksburg, and Prince William of Hesse-Kassel.

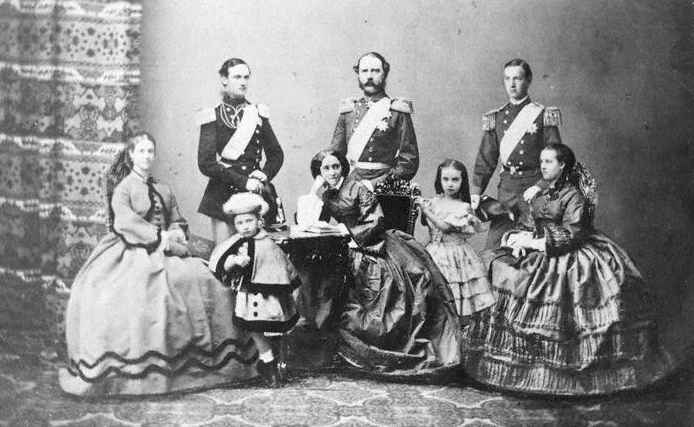
Prince William and his family, 1862: (back row left to right) Frederick, Christian, William; (front row left to right) Dagmar, Valdemar, Louise, Thyra, Alexandra

Although William was of royal blood (his mother and father were both great-grandchildren of Frederick V of Denmark and great-great-grandchildren of George II of Great Britain) his family was relatively obscure and lived a comparatively normal life by royal standards. In 1852, however, his father was designated the heir presumptive to the childless Frederick VII of Denmark, and the following year the family became princes and princesses of Denmark. William's siblings were Frederick (who succeeded their father as King of Denmark), Alexandra (who married Edward VII of the United Kingdom), Dagmar (who married Alexander III of Russia), Thyra (who married Ernest Augustus, Crown Prince of Hanover) and Valdemar.

William's mother tongue was Danish, with English as a second language. He was also taught French and German. He embarked on a career in the Royal Danish Navy, and enrolled as a naval cadet along with his elder brother Frederick. While Frederick was described as "quiet and extremely well-behaved", William was "lively and full of pranks".

== King of the Hellenes ==
Following the expulsion of Otto of Greece in October 1862, the Greek people had rejected Otto's brother and designated successor Luitpold, although they still favored a monarchy rather than a republic. Many Greeks, seeking closer ties to the pre-eminent world power, the United Kingdom, rallied around Prince Alfred, Duke of Edinburgh, second son of Queen Victoria and Prince Albert. British prime minister Lord Palmerston believed that the Greeks were "panting for increase in territory", hoping for a gift of the Ionian Islands, which were then a British protectorate. The London Conference of 1832, however, prohibited any of the Great Powers' ruling families from accepting the crown of Greece. Even without this restriction, Queen Victoria herself was adamantly opposed to the idea. The Greeks nevertheless insisted on holding a plebiscite in which Alfred received over 95% of the 240,000 votes. There were 93 votes for a Republic and six for a Greek national to be chosen as king. King Otto received one vote.

With Prince Alfred's exclusion, the search began for an alternative candidate. The French favored Henri d'Orléans, duc d'Aumale, while the British proposed Queen Victoria's brother-in-law Ernest II, Duke of Saxe-Coburg and Gotha, her nephew Prince Leiningen, and Archduke Maximilian of Austria, among others. Eventually, the Greeks and Great Powers winnowed their choice to Prince William of Denmark, who had received six votes in the plebiscite. Aged only 17, he was elected King of the Hellenes on 30 March [O.S. 18 March] 1863 by the Greek National Assembly under the regnal name of George I. Paradoxically, he ascended a royal throne before his father, who became King of Denmark on 15 November the same year. There were two significant differences between George's elevation and that of his predecessor, Otto. First, he was acclaimed unanimously by the Greek Assembly, rather than imposed on the people by foreign powers. Second, he was proclaimed "King of the Hellenes" instead of "King of Greece", which had been Otto's style.

George's ceremonial enthronement in Copenhagen on 6 June was attended by a delegation of Greeks led by First Admiral and Prime Minister Konstantinos Kanaris. At the ceremony, it was announced that the British government would cede the Ionian Islands to Greece in honor of the new monarch.

== Early reign ==
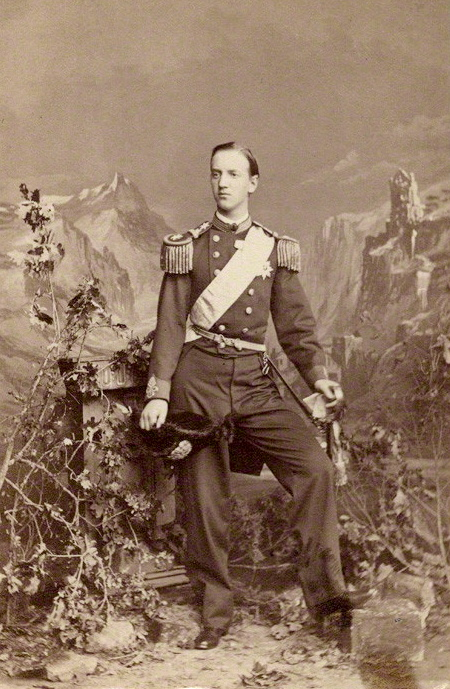
Photograph by Southwell Bros., 1863

The new 17-year-old king toured Saint Petersburg, London and Paris before departing for Greece from the French port of Toulon on 22 October aboard the Greek flagship Hellas. He arrived in Athens on 30 October [O.S. 18 October] 1863, after docking at Piraeus the previous day. He was determined not to make the mistakes of his predecessor, so he quickly learned Greek. The new king was seen frequently and informally in the streets of Athens, where his predecessor had only appeared in pomp. King George found the Old Royal Palace in a state of disarray, after the hasty departure of King Otto, and took to mending and updating it. He also sought to ensure that he was not seen as too influenced by his Danish advisers, ultimately sending his uncle, Prince Julius, back to Denmark with the words, "I will not allow any interference with the conduct of my government". Another adviser, Count Wilhelm Sponneck, became unpopular for advocating a policy of disarmament and tactlessly questioning the descent of modern Greeks from classical antecedents. Like Julius, he was dispatched back to Denmark.

From May 1864, George undertook a tour of the Peloponnese, through Corinth, Argos, Tripolitsa, Sparta, and Kalamata, where he embarked on the frigate Hellas. Proceeding northwards along the coast accompanied by British, French and Russian naval vessels, the Hellas reached Corfu on 6 June, for the ceremonial handover of the Ionian Islands by the British High Commissioner, Sir Henry Storks.

Politically, the new king took steps to conclude the protracted constitutional deliberations of the Assembly. On 19 October 1864, he sent the Assembly a demand, countersigned by Konstantinos Kanaris, explaining that he had accepted the crown on the understanding that a new constitution would be finalized, and that if it was not he would feel himself at "perfect liberty to adopt such measures as the disappointment of my hopes may suggest". It was unclear from the wording whether he meant to return to Denmark or impose a constitution, but as either event was undesirable the Assembly soon came to an agreement.

On 28 November 1864, George took the oath to defend the new constitution, which created a unicameral assembly (Vouli) with representatives elected by direct, secret, universal male suffrage, a first in modern Europe. A constitutional monarchy was set up with George deferring to the legitimate authority of the elected officials, although he was aware of the corruption present in elections and the difficulty of ruling a mostly illiterate population. Between 1864 and 1910, there were 21 general elections and 70 different governments.

Internationally, George maintained a strong relationship with his brother-in-law the Prince of Wales, who in 1901 became King Edward VII, and sought his help in defusing the recurring and contentious issue of Crete, an overwhelmingly Greek island that remained under Ottoman Turk control. Since the reign of Otto, the Greek desire to unite Greek lands in one nation had been a sore spot with Great Britain and France, which had embarrassed Otto by occupying the main Greek port of Piraeus to dissuade Greek irredentism during the Crimean War. During the Cretan Revolt (1866–1869), the Prince of Wales unsuccessfully sought the support of the British Foreign Secretary, Lord Derby, to intervene in Crete on behalf of Greece. Ultimately, the Great Powers did not intervene, and the Ottomans put down the rebellion.

== Marriage and children ==
George first met Grand Duchess Olga Constantinovna of Russia in 1863, when she was 12 years old, on a visit to the court of Tsar Alexander II between his election to the Greek throne and his arrival in Athens. They met for a second time in April 1867, when George went to the Russian Empire to visit his sister Dagmar, who had married the Tsar's heir, Tsarevich Alexander. While George was privately a Lutheran, the Romanovs were Orthodox Christians like the majority of Greeks, and George thought a marriage with a Russian grand duchess would re-assure his subjects on the question of his future children's religion. Olga was just 16 years old when she married George at the Winter Palace in Saint Petersburg on 27 October 1867. After a honeymoon at Tsarskoye Selo, the couple left Russia for Greece on 9 November. Over the next 20 years, they had eight children:

Name	Birth	Death	Notes
King Constantine I	2 August 1868	11 January 1923	married Princess Sophia of Prussia and had six children, including three subsequent kings of Greece: George II, Alexander, and Paul
Prince George	24 June 1869	25 November 1957	married Princess Marie Bonaparte and had two children
Princess Alexandra	30 August 1870	24 September 1891	married Grand Duke Paul Alexandrovich of Russia and had two children
Prince Nicholas	22 January 1872	8 February 1938	married Grand Duchess Elena Vladimirovna of Russia and had three daughters
Princess Maria	3 March 1876	14 December 1940	who married firstly Grand Duke George Mikhailovich of Russia, with whom she had two daughters, and secondly Admiral Perikles Ioannidis
Princess Olga	7 April 1880	2 November 1880	died aged seven months
Prince Andrew	2 February 1882	3 December 1944	married Princess Alice of Battenberg and had five children, including Prince Philip, Duke of Edinburgh
Prince Christopher	10 August 1888	21 January 1940	who married firstly American widow Nancy Stewart Worthington Leeds and secondly Princess Françoise d'Orléans, with whom he had one child.

As a marriage gift, the Tsar gave George a group of islands in the Petalioi Gulf, which the family visited on the royal yacht Amphitrite. George later purchased a country estate, Tatoi, north of Athens, and on Corfu he built a summer villa called Mon Repos. George developed Tatoi, building roads and planting grapes for making his own wine, Chateau Décélie. Intent on not letting his subjects know that he missed Denmark, he discreetly maintained a dairy at his palace at Tatoi, which was managed by native Danes and served as a bucolic reminder of his homeland. Queen Olga was far less careful in hiding her nostalgia for her native Russia, often visiting Russian ships at Piraeus two or three times before they weighed anchor. When alone with his wife, George usually conversed in German. Their children were taught English by their nannies, and when talking with his children he therefore spoke mainly English except to his son Andrew who refused to speak anything but Greek.

The King was related by marriage to the British, Russian and Prussian monarchs, maintaining a particularly strong attachment to the Prince and Princess of Wales, who visited Athens in 1869. Their visit occurred despite continued lawlessness which culminated in the kidnap of a party of British and Italian tourists, including Lord and Lady Muncaster. Two female hostages, a child and Lord Muncaster were released, but four of the others were murdered: British diplomat E. H. C. Herbert (the first cousin of Lord Carnarvon), Frederick Vyner (the brother-in-law of Lord Ripon, Lord President of the Council), Italian diplomat Count Boyl di Putifigari, and Mr. Lloyd (an engineer). George's relationships with other ruling houses assisted him and his small country but also often put them at the center of national political struggles in Europe.

From 1864 to 1874, Greece had 21 governments, the longest of which lasted a year and a half. In July 1874, Charilaos Trikoupis, a member of the Greek Parliament, wrote an anonymous article in the newspaper Kairoi blaming King George and his advisors for the continuing political crisis caused by the lack of stable governments. In the article, he accused the King of acting like an absolute monarch by imposing minority governments on the people. If the King insisted, he argued, that only a politician commanding a majority in the Vouli could be appointed prime minister, then politicians would be forced to work together more harmoniously to construct a coalition government. Such a plan, he wrote, would end the political instability and reduce the large number of smaller parties. Trikoupis admitted to writing the article after a man supposed by the authorities to be the author was arrested, whereupon he was taken into custody himself. After a public outcry, he was released and subsequently acquitted of the charge of "undermining the constitutional order". The following year, the King asked Trikoupis to form a government (without a majority) and then read a speech from the throne declaring that in future the leader of the majority party in parliament would be appointed prime minister.

== Territorial expansion ==
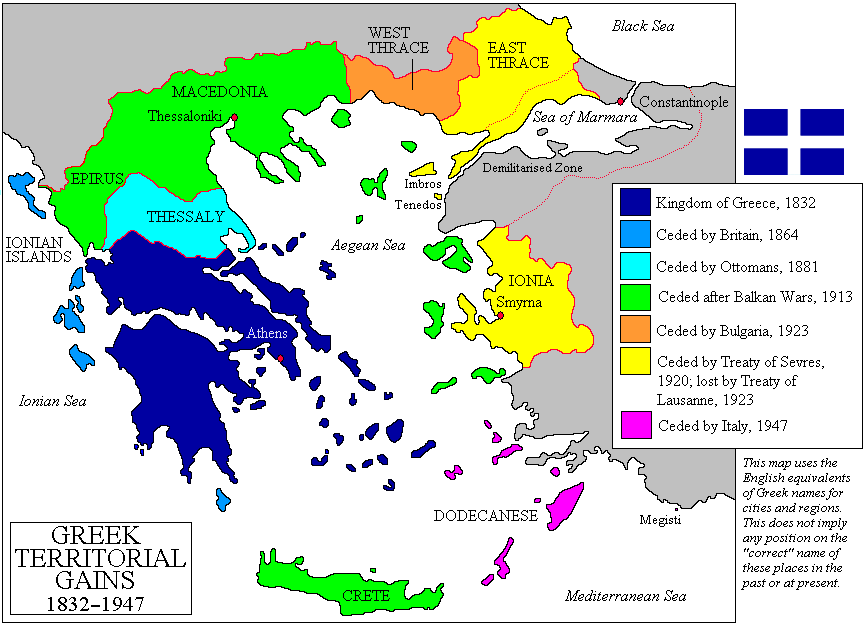
Expansion of the Greek kingdom from 1832 to 1947. Thessaly transferred from Ottoman to Greek sovereignty in 1881.

Throughout the 1870s, Greece kept pressure on the Ottoman Empire, seeking territorial expansion into Epirus and Thessaly. The Russo-Turkish War of 1877–1878 provided the first potential alliance for the Greek kingdom. George's sister Dagmar was the daughter-in-law of Alexander II of Russia, and she sought to have Greece join the war. The French and British refused to countenance such an act, and Greece remained neutral. At the Congress of Berlin convened in 1878 to determine peace terms for the Russo-Turkish War, Greece staked a claim to Crete, Epirus and Thessaly.

The borders were still not finalized in June 1880 when a proposal very favorable to Greece that included Mount Olympus and Ioannina was offered by the British and French. When the Ottoman Turks strenuously objected, Prime Minister Trikoupis made the mistake of threatening a mobilization of the Hellenic Army. A coincident change of government in France, the resignation of Charles de Freycinet and his replacement with Jules Ferry, led to disputes among the Great Powers and, despite British support for a more pro-Greek settlement, the Turks subsequently granted Greece all of Thessaly but only the part of Epirus around Arta. When the government of Trikoupis fell, the new prime minister, Alexandros Koumoundouros, reluctantly accepted the new boundaries.

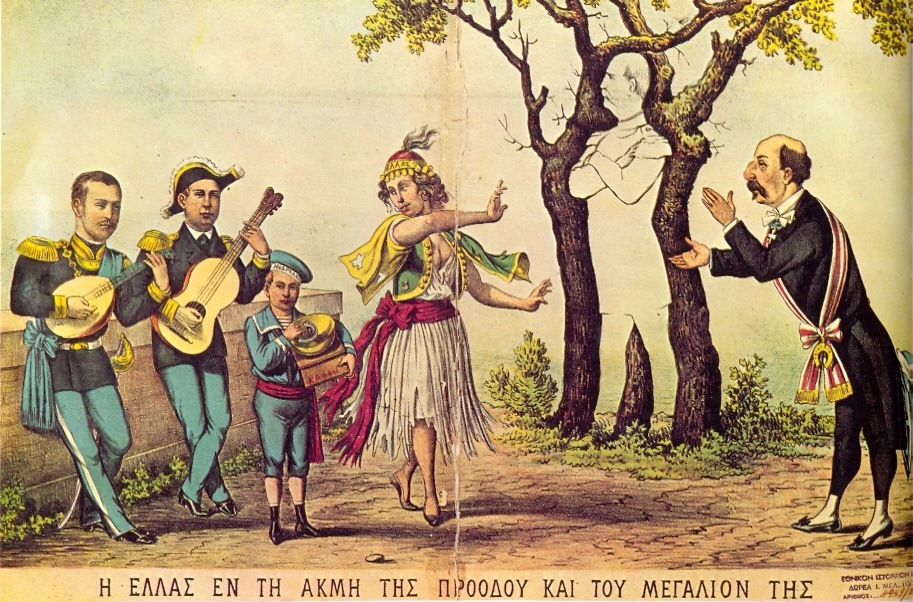
Greek satirical cartoon of the 1880s. The legend reads "Greece at the peak of its progress and its greatness". The Greek royal princes play music to which the country dances, while Prime Minister Trikoupis applauds and King George I is shown in an olive tree, the symbol of Trikoupis's party.

While Trikoupis followed a policy of retrenchment within the established borders of the Greek state, having learned a valuable lesson about the vicissitudes of the Great Powers, his main opponents, the Nationalist Party led by Theodoros Deligiannis, sought to inflame the anti-Turkish feelings of the Greeks at every opportunity. The next opportunity arose in 1885 when Bulgarians rose in revolt in Eastern Rumelia and united the province with Bulgaria. Deligiannis rode to victory over Trikoupis in elections that year saying that if the Bulgarians could defy the Treaty of Berlin, so should the Greeks.

Deligiannis mobilized the Hellenic Army, and the British Royal Navy blockaded Greece. The admiral in charge of the blockade was Prince Alfred, Duke of Edinburgh, who had been the first choice of the Greeks to be their king in 1863, and the First Lord of the Admiralty at the time was Lord Ripon, whose brother-in-law had been murdered in Greece 16 years before. This was not the last time that King George discovered that his family ties were not always to his advantage. Deligiannis was forced to demobilize and Trikoupis regained the premiership. Between 1882 and 1897, Trikoupis and Deligiannis alternated the premiership as their fortunes rose and fell.

== National progress ==
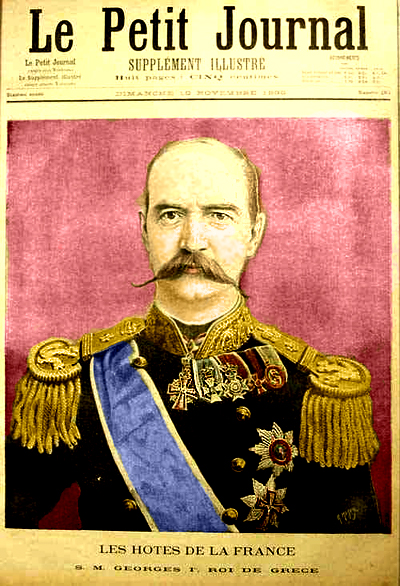
King George on the front page of French newspaper Le Petit Journal, 1895

George's silver jubilee in 1888 was celebrated throughout the Hellenic world, and Athens was decorated with garlands for the anniversary of his accession on 30 October. Visitors included the Crown Prince of Denmark, the Prince and Princess of Wales, the Duke and Duchess of Edinburgh, Grand Dukes Sergei and Paul of Russia, and Djevad Pasha from the Ottoman Empire, who presented the King with two Arabian horses as gifts. Jubilee events in the week of 30 October included balls, galas, parades, a thanksgiving service at the Metropolitan Cathedral of Athens, and a lunch for 500 invited guests in a blue and white tent on the Acropolis.

Greece in the last decades of the 19th century was increasingly prosperous and was developing a sense of its role on the European stage. In 1893, the Corinth Canal was built by a French company cutting the sea journey from the Adriatic Sea to Piraeus by 150 miles (241 km). In 1896, the Olympic Games were revived in Athens, and the Opening Ceremony of the 1896 Summer Olympics was presided over by the King. When Spiridon Louis, a shepherd from just outside Athens, ran into the Panathinaiko Stadium to win the Marathon event, the Crown Prince ran down onto the field to run the last thousand yards beside the Greek gold medalist, while the King stood and applauded.

The popular desire to unite all Greeks within a single territory (Megali Idea) was never far below the surface and another revolt against Turkish rule erupted in Crete. In February 1897, King George sent his son, Prince George, to take possession of the island. The Greeks refused an Ottoman offer of an autonomous administration, and Deligiannis mobilized for war. The Great Powers refused to allow the expansion of Greece, and on 25 February 1897 announced that Crete would be under an autonomous administration and ordered the Greek and Ottoman Turk militias to withdraw.

The Turks agreed, but Prime Minister Deligiannis refused and dispatched 1400 troops to Crete under the command of Colonel Timoleon Vassos. While the Great Powers announced a blockade, Greek troops crossed the Macedonian border and Abdul Hamid II declared war. The announcement that Greece was finally at war with the Turks was greeted by delirious displays of patriotism and spontaneous parades in honor of the King in Athens. Volunteers by the thousands streamed north to join the forces under the command of Crown Prince Constantine.

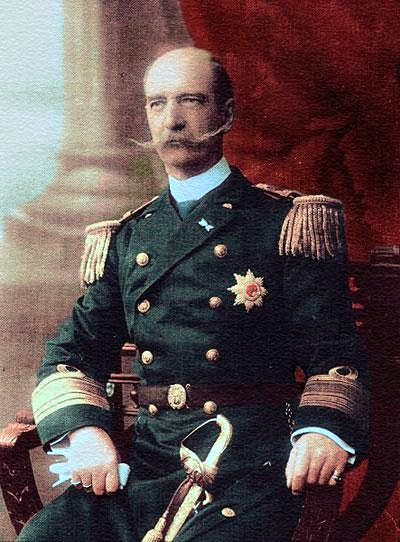
Portrait of George I

The war went badly for the ill-prepared Greeks; the only saving grace was the swiftness with which the Hellenic Army was overrun. By the end of April 1897, the war was lost. The worst consequences of defeat for the Greeks were mitigated by the intervention of the King's relations in Britain and Russia; nevertheless, the Greeks were forced to give up Crete to international administration, and agree to minor territorial concessions in favor of the Turks and an indemnity of 4 million Turkish pounds.

The jubilation with which Greeks had hailed their king at the beginning of the war was reversed in defeat. For a time, he considered abdication. It was not until the King faced down an assassination attempt on 27 February 1898 with great bravery that his subjects again held their monarch in high esteem. Returning from a trip to the beach at Phaleron in an open carriage, George and his daughter Maria were shot at by two riflemen. The King tried to shield his daughter; both were unhurt though the coachman and a horse were wounded. The gunmen (an Athens clerk called Karditzis and his assistant) fled into the Hymettus hills but they were spotted and arrested. Both were beheaded at Nauplia.

Later that year, after continued unrest in Crete, which included the murder of the British vice-consul, Prince George of Greece was made the Governor-General of Crete under the suzerainty of the Sultan, after the proposal was put forward by the Great Powers. Greece was effectively in day-to-day control of Crete for the first time in modern history.

== Later reign and assassination ==
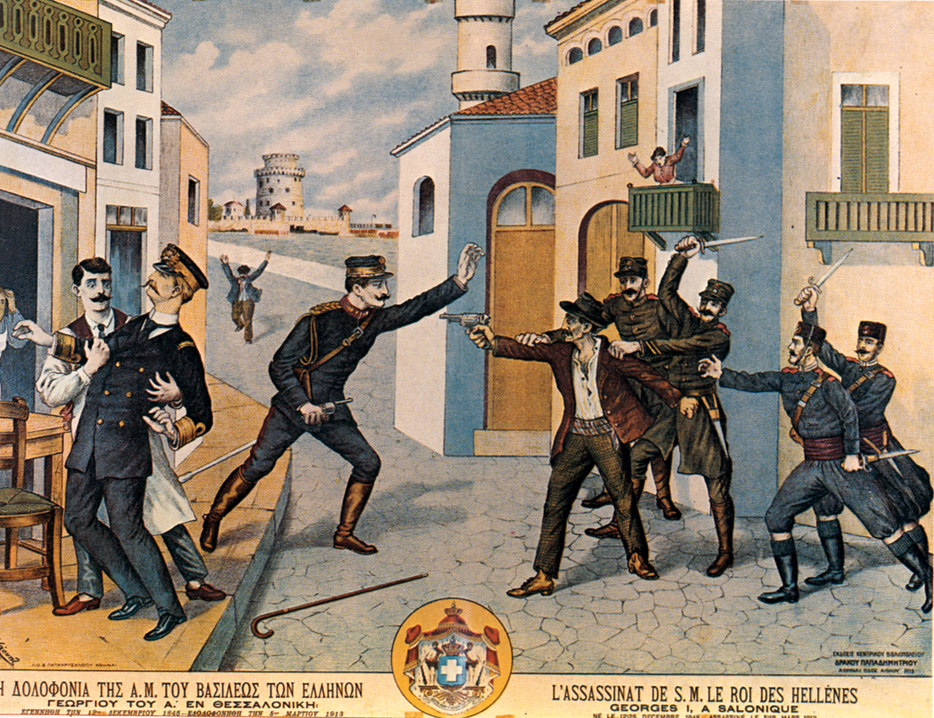
Assassination of George I as depicted in a contemporary lithograph

The death of Britain's Queen Victoria on 22 January 1901 left King George as the second-longest-reigning monarch in Europe, behind only Emperor Franz Joseph I of Austria. His always cordial relations with his brother-in-law, the new King Edward VII, continued to tie Greece to Britain. This was abundantly important in Britain's support of King George's son Prince George as Governor-General of Crete. Nevertheless, Prince George resigned in 1906 after a leader in the Cretan Assembly, Eleftherios Venizelos, campaigned to have him removed.

As a response to the Young Turk Revolution of 1908, Venizelos's power base was further strengthened, and on 8 October 1908 the Cretan Assembly passed a resolution in favor of union despite both the reservations of the Athens government under Georgios Theotokis and the objections of the Great Powers. The muted reaction of the Athens Government to the news from Crete led to an unsettled state of affairs on the mainland.

In August 1909, a group of army officers that had formed a military league, Stratiotikos Syndesmos, demanded, among other things, that the royal family be stripped of their military commissions. To save the King the embarrassment of removing his sons from their commissions, they resigned them. The military league attempted a coup d'état, and the King insisted on supporting the duly elected Hellenic Parliament in response. Eventually, the military league joined forces with Venizelos in calling for a National Assembly to revise the constitution. King George gave way, and new elections to the revising assembly were held in August 1910. After some political maneuvering, Venizelos became prime minister of a minority government. Just a month later, Venizelos called new elections for 11 December [O.S. 28 November] 1910, at which he won an overwhelming majority after most of the opposition parties declined to take part.

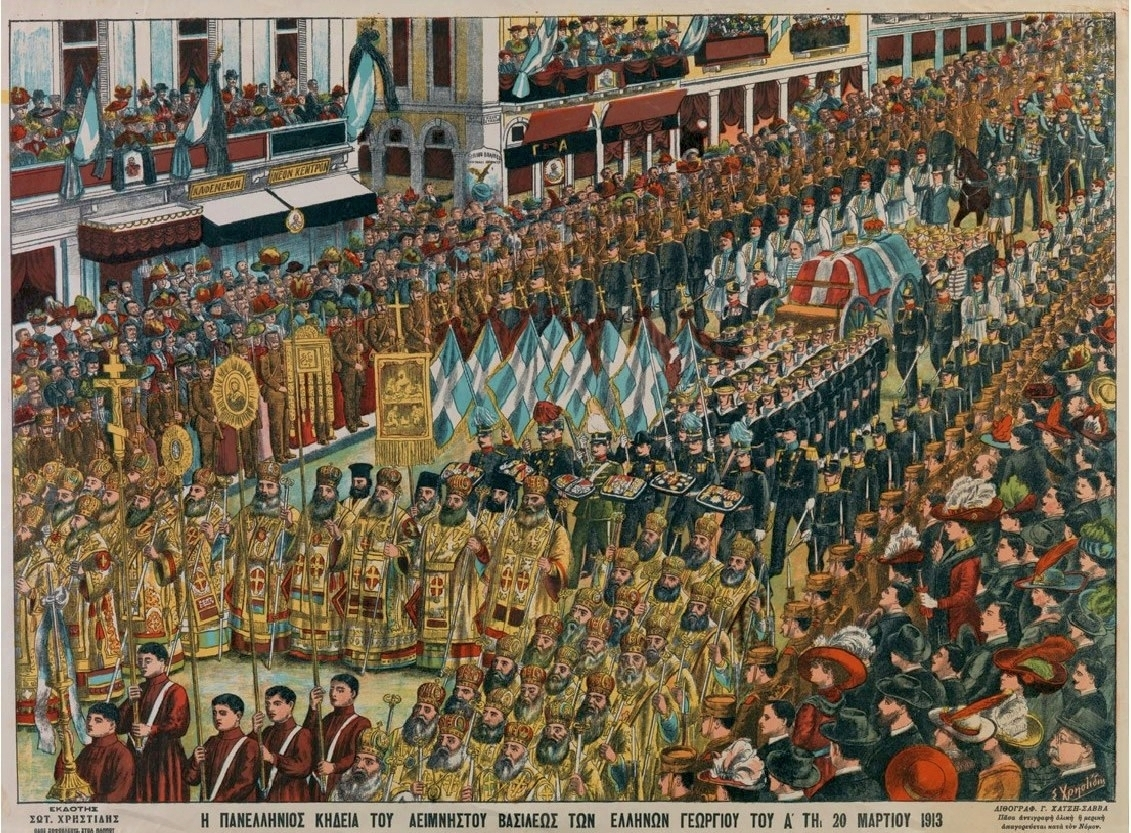
Funeral of King George I in Athens

Venizelos and the King were united in their belief that the nation required a strong army to repair the damage of the humiliating defeat of 1897. Crown Prince Constantine was reinstated as Inspector-General of the Army, and later Commander-in-Chief. Under his and Venizelos's close supervision, the military was retrained and equipped with French and British help, and new ships were ordered for the Hellenic Navy. Meanwhile, through diplomatic means, Venizelos had united the Christian countries of the Balkans in opposition to the ailing Ottoman Empire.

When the Kingdom of Montenegro declared war on Turkey on 8 October 1912, it was quickly joined by Serbia, Bulgaria, and Greece in what is known as the First Balkan War. George was on vacation in Denmark, so he immediately returned to Greece via Vienna, arriving in Athens to be met by a large and enthusiastic crowd on the evening of 9 October. The results of this campaign differed radically from the Greek experience at the hands of the Turks in 1897. The well-trained Greek forces, 200,000 strong, won victory after victory. On 9 November 1912, Greek forces commanded by Crown Prince Constantine rode into Thessaloniki, just a few hours ahead of a Bulgarian division. Three days later King George rode in triumph through the streets of Thessaloniki, the second-largest Greek city, accompanied by the Crown Prince and Venizelos. Less than two weeks before the King's death, Greek troops entered the chief Epirus town of Ioannina on 6 March 1913.

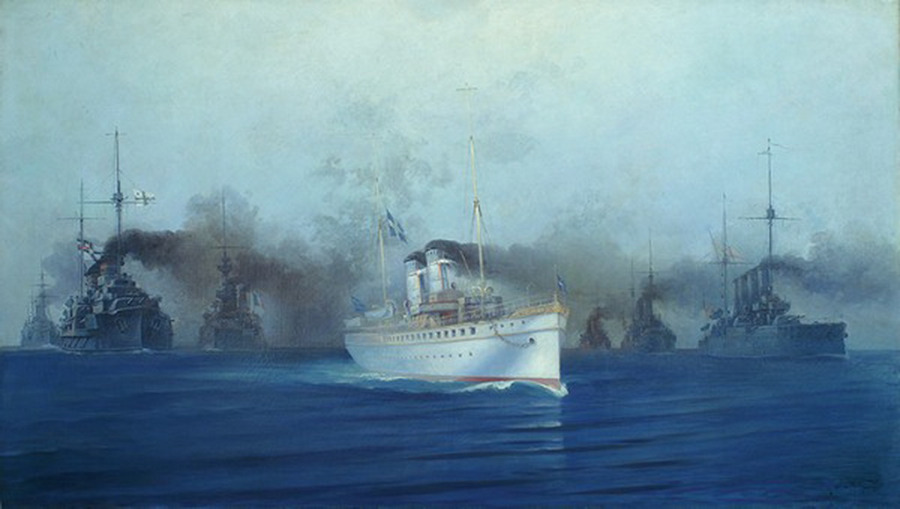
Royal yacht Amphitrite transporting the body of George I to Athens

As he approached the fiftieth anniversary of his accession, the King made plans to abdicate in favor of his son Constantine immediately after the celebration of his golden jubilee in October 1913. Just as he did in Athens, George went about Thessaloniki without any meaningful protection force. While out on an afternoon walk near the White Tower on 18 March 1913, he was shot at close range in the back by Alexandros Schinas, who was "said to belong to a Socialist organization" and "declared when arrested that he had killed the King because he refused to give him money". George died instantly, the bullet having penetrated his heart. The Greek government denied any political motive for the assassination, saying that Schinas was an alcoholic vagrant. Schinas was tortured in prison and fell to his death from a police station window six weeks later.

The King's body was taken to Athens on the yacht Amphitrite, escorted by a flotilla of naval vessels. For three days the coffin of the King, draped in the Danish and Greek flags, lay in the Metropolitan Cathedral in Athens before his body was committed to a tomb at his palace in Tatoi.

== Honours and arms ==
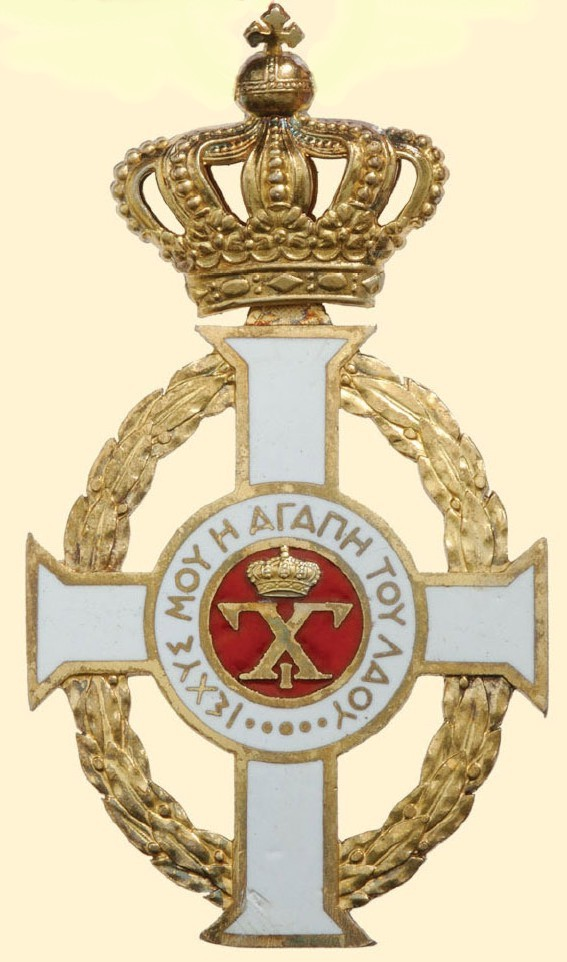
Badge of the Order of George I: The order was instituted by Constantine I in 1915 in memory of his father.

=== Honours ===
- Denmark:
  - Knight of the Elephant, 6 June 1863 – during his enthronement ceremony as King of the Hellenes
  - Cross of Honour of the Order of the Dannebrog, 9 September 1863
  - Grand Commander of the Dannebrog, 30 June 1871
  - Commemorative Medal for the Golden Wedding of King Christian IX and Queen Louise
- Russia: Knight of St. Andrew, September 1863
- Prussia: Knight of the Black Eagle, 8 May 1867
- Italy: Knight of the Annunciation, 15 October 1867
- (Austrian Empire) (Kingdom of Hungary) Austria-Hungary: Grand Cross of the Royal Hungarian Order of St. Stephen, 1867
- Sweden: Knight of the Seraphim, with Collar, 17 April 1868
- (Saxe-Coburg and Gotha) (Duchy of Saxe-Altenburg) (Saxe-Meiningen) Ernestine duchies: Grand Cross of the Saxe-Ernestine House Order, 1869
- Spain:
  - Grand Cross of the Order of Charles III, 12 May 1869
  - Knight of the Golden Fleece, 12 November 1871
  - Grand Cross of Naval Merit, with White Decoration, 27 January 1892
- (Duchy of Anhalt) Anhalt: Grand Cross of the Order of Albert the Bear, 1870
- Brunswick: Grand Cross of the Order of Henry the Lion, 1871
- Mecklenburg: Grand Cross of the Wendish Crown, with Crown in Ore, 24 August 1871
- Württemberg: Grand Cross of the Württemberg Crown, 1871
- Saxe-Weimar-Eisenach: Grand Cross of the White Falcon, 1873
- Baden:
  - Knight of the House Order of Fidelity, 1876
  - Grand Cross of the Zähringer Lion, 1876
- United Kingdom:
  - Stranger Knight Companion of the Garter, 12 July 1876
  - Honorary Knight Grand Cross of the Royal Victorian Order, 8 March 1901
  - Recipient of the Royal Victorian Chain, 27 November 1905
- Hesse and by Rhine: Grand Cross of the Ludwig Order, 18 September 1879
- France: Grand Cross of the Legion of Honour, 1880
- Bavaria: Knight of St. Hubert, 1892
- Norway: Grand Cross of St. Olav, with Collar, 6 October 1906
- Romania: Collar of the Order of Carol I, 1912
- Saxony: Knight of the Rue Crown

==== Military appointments ====
- Admiral of the Fleet of the Danish Navy
- Honorary admiral of the British Royal Navy, 31 October 1903

=== Arms ===

The distinctive Greek flag of blue and white cross was first hoisted during the Greek War of Independence in March 1822. This was later modified so that the shade of blue matched that of the Bavarian coat of arms of the first King of Greece, Otto. The shield is emblazoned with a smaller version of the royal arms of Denmark, including the three lions of the arms of Denmark proper, the two lions of Schleswig, the nettle leaf of Holstein, the horse head of Lauenburg, the two red bars of the House of Oldenburg and the cross of Delmenhorst. The supporters on either side both depicting Heracles are quite similar to the two wild men from the Danish royal arms. Beneath the shield is the motto in Greek, Ἰσχύς μου ἡ αγάπη τοῦ λαοῦ ("The people's love is my strength"). Beneath the motto dangles the Grand Cross of the Order of the Redeemer, Greece's premier decoration of honor.

== Ancestry ==
Ancestors of George I of Greece

8. Frederick Charles Louis, Duke of Schleswig-Holstein-Sonderburg-Beck
4. Frederick William, Duke of Schleswig-Holstein-Sonderburg-Glücksburg
9. Countess Friederike von Schlieben
2. Christian IX, King of Denmark
10. Prince Charles of Hesse-Kassel
5. Princess Louise Caroline of Hesse-Kassel
11. Princess Louise of Denmark
1. George I, King of the Hellenes
12. Prince Frederick of Hesse-Kassel
6. Prince William of Hesse-Kassel
13. Princess Caroline of Nassau-Usingen
3. Princess Louise of Hesse-Kassel
14. Frederick, Hereditary Prince of Denmark
7. Princess Charlotte of Denmark
15. Duchess Sophia Frederica of Mecklenburg-Schwerin

== Sources ==
- Campbell, John; Sherrard, Philip (1968). Modern Greece. London: Ernest Benn.
- Christmas, Walter (1914). King George of Greece. Translated by A. G. Chater. New York: McBride, Nast & Company.
- Clogg, Richard (1979). A Short History of Modern Greece. Cambridge University Press.
- Forster, Edward S. (1958). A Short History of Modern Greece 1821–1956 3rd edition. London: Methuen and Co.
- Van der Kiste, John (1994). Kings of the Hellenes. Stroud, Gloucestershire: Sutton Publishing. ISBN 0-7509-0525-5.
- Woodhouse, C. M. (1968). The Story of Modern Greece. London: Faber and Faber.

George I of Greece House of Schleswig-Holstein-Sonderburg-Glücksburg Cadet branch of the House of Oldenburg Born: 24 December 1845 Died: 18 March 1913
Regnal titles
Preceded by Otto as King of Greece	King of the Hellenes; 30 March 1863 – 18 March 1913	Succeeded by Constantine I
