= Princess Marie of Liechtenstein (born 1959) =

Princess Marie
- Princess Gundakar of Liechtenstein
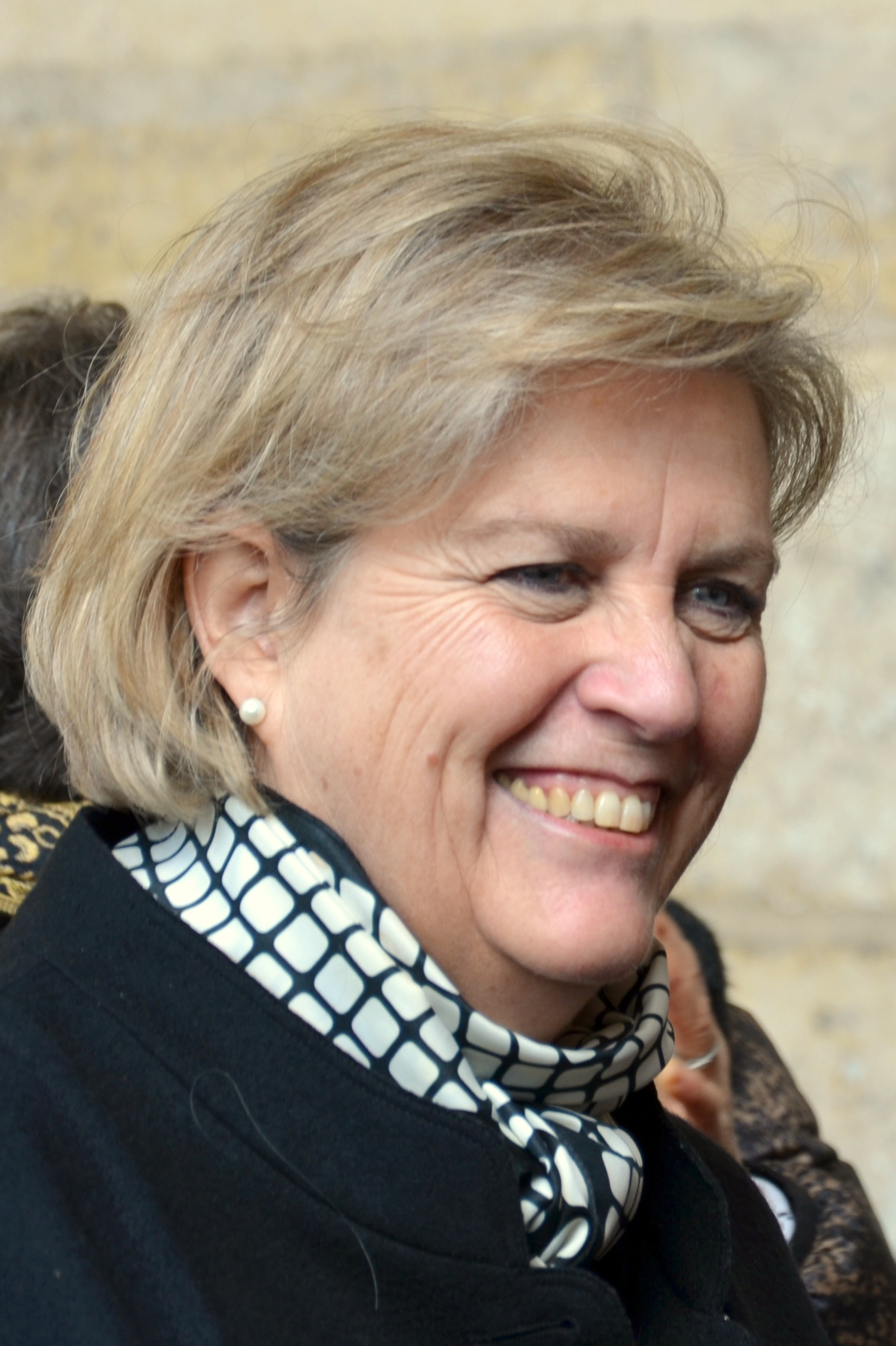
- Marie in 2019
- Born: Marie Isabelle Marguerite Anne Geneviève d'Orléans; 3 January 1959 (age 67); Boulogne-Billancourt, France
- Spouse: Prince Gundakar of Liechtenstein (m. 1989)
- Issue: Princess Leopoldine; Princess Marie Immaculée; Prince Johann; Princess Margarete; Prince Gabriel
- House: Orléans
- Father: Henri, Count of Paris
- Mother: Duchess Marie Thérèse of Württemberg

Princess Marie of Liechtenstein (née Princess Marie Isabelle Marguerite Anne Geneviève of Orléans; born on 3 January 1959) is the eldest daughter of Prince Henri, Count of Paris, Duke of France and his former wife Duchess Marie Thérèse of Württemberg. She is the wife of Prince Gundakar of Liechtenstein, a great-grandson of Prince Alfred of Liechtenstein.

== Youth ==
Her paternal grandfather, the Comte de Paris, head of the Orléanist House of France, received a letter of congratulations upon the princess's birth from General Charles de Gaulle. Baptised 17 days after her birth by Maurice, Cardinal Feltin, the Archbishop of Paris, in the chapel of the Archdiocese, her god-parents were two of her grandparents; Philipp Albrecht, Duke of Wurttemberg and Isabelle d'Orléans, Duchess of Guise.

Princess Marie's early childhood was spent in Paris where, from October 1959 to April 1962, her father worked at the Secretariat-General for National Defence and Security as a member of the French Foreign Legion. Transferred from there to a garrison in Germany, in the beginning of 1963 his family joined him at Bonifacio in Corsica where he took up a new assignment as military instructor.

Returning to civilian life in 1967, her brother, Prince Francois, Count of Clermont and his family briefly occupied the Blanche Neige pavilion on his father's Manoir du Coeur-Volant estate at Louveciennes in 1967, before renting an apartment of their own in the XVe arrondissement. For some months in that year Marie attended a private, parochial day school in Paris, before being sent to boarding school at Cours Dupanloup in Boulogne-sur-Seine in 1968 and Sacré-Coeur de Saint-Maur. In 1972 she boarded at a Dominican establishment in Fribourg during the family's residence in Corly while Clermont managed public relations for the Geneva office of a Swiss investment firm.

Upon receiving her bac, Marie enrolled at the Institut Catholique de Paris where she obtained a language interpretation degree in German and English after completing the Institut Supérieur d'Interprétariat et de Traduction curriculum. She also earned a professional degree through the Franco-German and Franco-English Chambers of Commerce, as well as a DEUG in German.

== Career ==
As the eldest of five children, two of whom are intellectually disabled, much of Princess Marie's professional and volunteer work has been in behalf of children with special needs. In 1981 she spent several months serving needy children in Brazilian favelas through a Foi et Lumiere programme. Afterwards, she worked a year in Paris for a Catholic periodical. In 1984 Marie moved back to Geneva to organise the Enfants et Jeunes de la rue ("Street Kids") programme as part of the BICE, conducting outreach in various countries, including Colombia and Brazil.

Transferred by BICE back to Paris, the princess became head of the Commission on Special Medical-Pedagogical Services, which sponsors humanitarian conferences in Europe and the developing world.

Arms of Princess Marie

== Marriage ==
While on work assignment in Rio de Janeiro in September 1988, Marie attended a dinner hosted by Princess Isabel of Brazil (born 1944), where she met their mutual cousin Prince Gundakar of Liechtenstein (grandson of Prince Alfred Roman of Liechtenstein). Fifth cousins as great-great-great grandchildren of Maximilian I of Bavaria, both also descend from France's "Citizen-King", Louis Philippe d'Orléans.

Marie and Gundakar encountered each other again in November 1988 at the wedding of two more mutual cousins, Duchess Mathilde of Wurttemberg and the Hereditary Count Erich von Waldburg-Zeil. More meetings in Europe followed. On 11 February 1989 the couple were received by Marie's paternal grandfather, Monseigneur the Count of Paris, at his Chantilly estate, after which the couple's betrothal was announced to the media (the fiancée's father had been informed of the engagement earlier that day by a hand-delivered letter written by Marie's mother, Marie Thérèse of Württemberg, Duchess of Montpensier.

The wedding date being set for 29 July 1989, the engagement initially triggered familial reconciliation. Although the Count of Clermont stated in a 12 May 1989 Point de Vue interview that it had been three years since he had seen Marie, he and his second wife, Michaela Cousino, had been welcomed for the first time to the home of his mother, the Countess of Paris, that day: Clermont further acknowledged to the press that, Marie having written to invite him to her wedding, he looked forward to conducting her to the altar, rumours to the contrary notwithstanding. At the engagement party held the next day at the Palais Pallavicini, the Vienna home of the fiancé's parents, photographs were taken, and would later be published, showing Clermont speaking cordially with his daughter, sons, former wife and future son-in-law.

However, it was on this occasion that Clermont learned that he would not be escorting Marie to her bridesgroom during the wedding. Meanwhile, the Duchess of Montpensier had sent out invitations to the wedding in her name alone, omitting not only mention of Marie's father, but also of the Count of Paris, the head of the dynasty who, until then, had largely sided with the Duchess de Montpensier in opposition to the dissolution of his son's first marriage. Moreover, the duchess had also rebuffed Monseigneur's offers to host the wedding at the Chapelle royale de Dreux or to commission the wedding gown from a major French haute couturier.

These decisions prompted father and son to join in calling for a familial boycott of the nuptials. Her grandfather reportedly called the decision "treason", as tradition dictated that a French princess of the Blood Royal weds in France unless the groom is the ruler or heir apparent of a foreign realm. The conflict was aggravated by divided family loyalties: instead of Dreux, the wedding was to be held at Friedrichshafen Castle in Germany, childhood home of the bride's mother. Princess Marie spent much time there in her youth during visits to her maternal grandparents. However, because her mother's brother Carl, Duke of Wurttemberg, now lived there with his wife Diane d'Orléans, sister of the Count of Clermont and daughter of the Count of Paris, relatives and members of foreign royal dynasties found themselves being urged by two sets of siblings, long married to each other, to take opposite sides in the families' quarrel. Marie declared, "It's in that castle that I've been happiest. It's there and only there that I will be married".

The compromise she announced, to hold the mandatory civil wedding at Dreux and to follow with Catholic nuptials at Friedrichshafen, failed to appease the head of the Orléans family; Monseigneur refused to attend either ceremony, as did Clermont. Nonetheless, that was the arrangement which transpired. Marie wed her prince civilly at Dreux's city hall on 22 July 1989, and religiously in the castle church of Friedrichshafen, on 29 July 1989. Only eight persons, including bride and groom, attended the civil wedding in France (including the Duchess of Montpensier, her son Prince Jean, Duke of Vendôme, and a brother of the groom). Although 250 guests attended the ceremony in Germany, absent were the Count of Clermont, the Count of Paris and all but two of Clermont's eight siblings; the hostess Diane, Duchess of Wurttemberg, was present, as was her brother Prince Jacques, Duke of Orléans, and their mother, Madame the Countess of Paris.

This was the first marriage of a member of the House of Orléans into a reigning dynasty since the 1929 wedding of Princess Françoise of Orléans to Prince Christopher of Greece. Gundakar is a third cousin of his sovereign, Hans Adam II of Liechtenstein, and is in the line of succession to that principality's throne. Gundakar Albert Alfred Petrus of Liechtenstein is the eldest son of Prince Johann of Liechtenstein and Princess Clothilde of Thurn und Taxis. He has a twin sister, Princess Diemut, and five younger siblings.

== Children ==
The couple have five children together:

- Princess Léopoldine Eléonore Thérèse Marie of Liechtenstein (b. 27 June 1990, Vienna), her godparents are Prince Eudes, Duke of Angoulême (maternal uncle) and Princess Eleonore of Liechtenstein (paternal aunt). She is the godmother of her first cousin Princess Antoinette of Orléans, eldest daughter of the Count and Countess of Paris. She is married to Bruno Walter Pedrosa João.
- Princess Marie Immaculata Elisabeth Rose Aldegunde of Liechtenstein (b. 15 December 1991, Vienna), her godparents are Prince Jean, Duke of Vendôme (maternal uncle) and Princess Aldegunde of Liechtenstein). She is the godmother of her first cousin Princess Jacinthe of Orléans, youngest daughter of the Count and Countess of Paris. She is married to Zurab Dzidziguri, brother of Princess Kristine de Bagration-Mukhrani.
- Prince Johann Wenzel Karl Emmeran Bonifatius Maria of Liechtenstein (b. 17 March 1993, Vienna), his godparents are Princess Blanche of Orléans (maternal aunt) and Prince Emmeran of Liechtenstein (paternal uncle). He is the godfather of his first cousin Prince Joseph of Orléans, younger son of the Count and Countess of Paris. He married Countess Felicitas von Hartig (b. 10 April 1994) civilly on 30 April 2023 and religiously in Vienna on 10 June. They have a daughter, Josefine (b. 2024).
- Princess Margarete Franciska Daria Wilhelmine Marie of Liechtenstein (b. 10 January 1995, Vienna), her godparents are Prince François, Count of Clermont (maternal uncle) and Princess Daria of Thurn und Taxis (father's cousin). She is the godmother of her first cousin Princess Louise-Marguerite of Orléans, middle daughter of the Count and Countess of Paris.
- Prince Gabriel Karl Bonaventura Alfred Valerian Maria of Liechtenstein (b. 6 May 1998, Vienna), his godparents are Prince Alfred of Liechtenstein and Madame Gilles Lambotte, née Maria-Edla de Rambuteau.

Princess Marie Isabelle is the godmother of Infanta Maria Francisca of Portugal and Princess Thérèse d'Orléans.

== Honours ==
=== Titles ===
- 1959-1989: Her Royal Highness Princess Marie Isabelle d’Orléans
- 1989 - present: Her Royal Highness Princess Marie of Liechtenstein, Countess of Rietberg

=== Honours ===
- (Kingdom of Portugal) Portuguese Royal Family:
  - Dame Grand Cross of the Order of Saint Isabel (4 July 2004)
