= Jean, Count of Paris =

Orléanist to the French throne since 2019

Jean d'Orléans
- Count of Paris
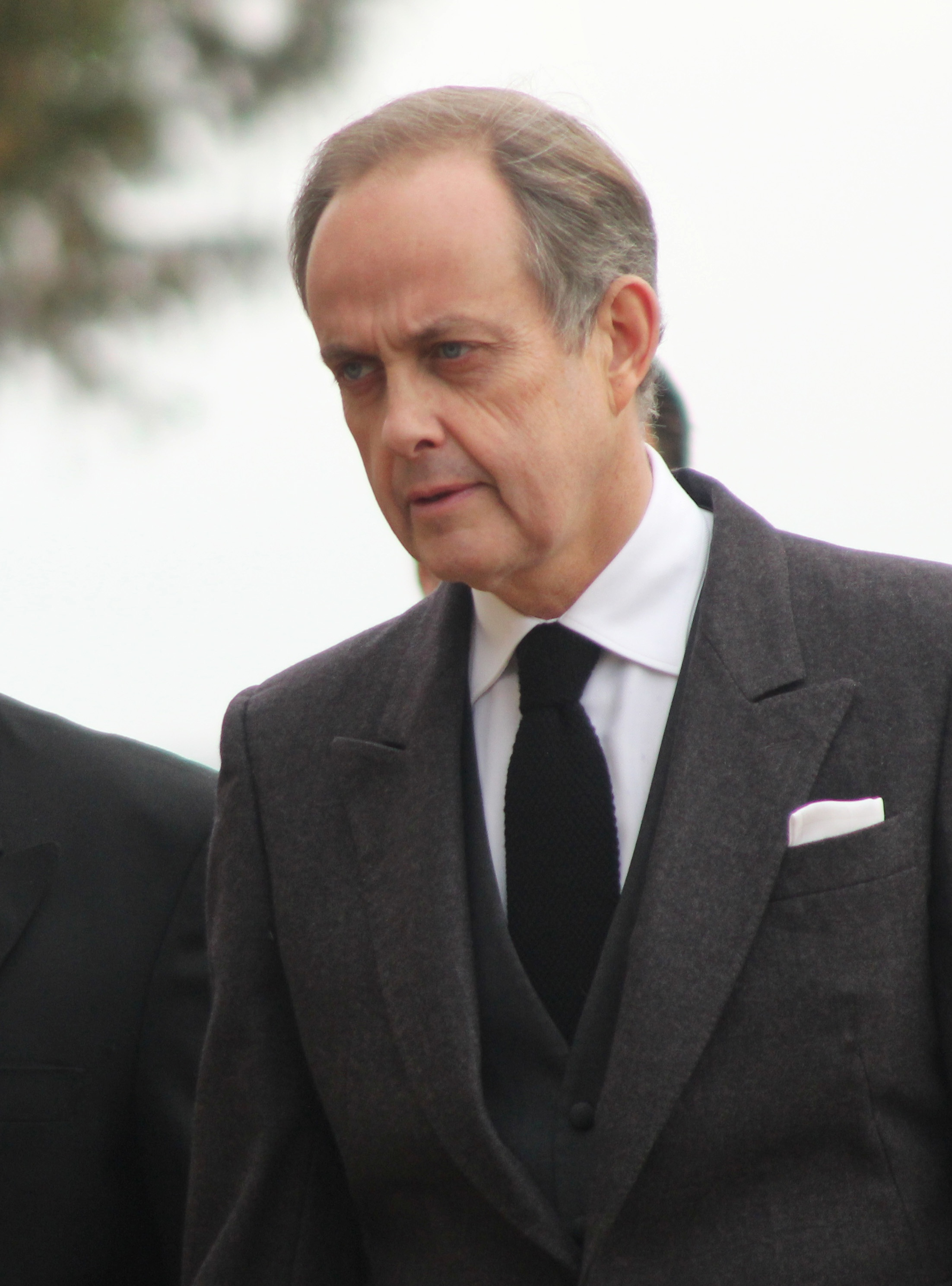
- Jean in 2019

Orléanist pretender to the French throne
- Pretence: 21 January 2019 – present
- Predecessor: Henri, Count of Paris
- Heir apparent: Gaston, Dauphin of France
- Born: 19 May 1965 (age 61); Boulogne-Billancourt, France
- Spouse: Philomena de Tornos Steinhart (m. 2009)
- Issue: Prince Gaston, Dauphin of France; Princess Antoinette; Princess Louise-Marguerite; Prince Joseph; Princess Jacinthe; Prince Alphonse
Names
- Jean Carl Pierre Marie
- House: Orléans
- Father: Prince Henri, Count of Paris
- Mother: Duchess Marie-Thérèse of Württemberg

Prince Jean Carl Pierre Marie d'Orléans, Count of Paris (born 19 May 1965) is the current head of the House of Orléans. Jean is the senior male descendant by primogeniture in the male-line of Louis Philippe I, King of the French, and thus according to the Orléanists the legitimate claimant to the defunct throne of France as Jean IV. Of France's three monarchist movements, Orléanism, Legitimism, and Bonapartism, most royalists are Orléanists. Jean is the second son of Henri, Count of Paris (1933–2019) and his former wife Duchess Marie-Thérèse of Württemberg (born 1934). With the death of his father, he has been using the style of Count of Paris since 2019.

== Biography ==
=== Early life and education ===
Jean d'Orléans was born on 19 May 1965 in Boulogne-Billancourt, the son of Henri of Orleans and Maria Theresa of Württemberg. He was baptized in the Catholic Church on 14 June 1965 in the Royal Chapel of Dreux. He received as godfather, his maternal uncle, Carl of Württemberg, and as godmother, his paternal aunt, Princess Chantal of Orleans.

After attending the Passy-Saint-Nicolas-Buzenval, a private Catholic secondary school, he attended the Sorbonne, where he obtained a master's degree in philosophy in 1989. In 1992, he earned a master's degree in law from the Free Faculty of Law, Economics and Management of Paris. In 1994, he earned a Master of Business Administration (MBA) from Azusa Pacific University in Los Angeles, California.

Jean completed his national service as an officer, first taking four months of classes at the Saumur Cavalry School. He was assigned as an officer aspirant, and then as a second lieutenant, and has been a reserve colonel of the French Army since January 2015.

After finishing his military duties, he began to work as a consultant at Lazard, then as a financial consultant at Deloitte, followed by working as a project manager at the Groupe Banque Populaire.

Jean is multilingual, speaking French, English, and German.

=== First engagement ===
Prince Jean was due to marry Duchess Tatjana of Oldenburg (b. 1974) in 2001. Duchess Tatjana is the youngest daughter of Duke Johann of Oldenburg (b. 1940) and his wife, Countess Ilka of Ortenburg (b. 1942). Her elder sister Eilika married Archduke Georg of Austria in 1997. However, the wedding was cancelled at the last moment because of a dispute over religious denomination: Jean's father, Henri, feared the Orléans claim to the throne would be compromised if there were to be a Protestant heir.

=== Second engagement and marriage ===
On 29 November 2008, Henri, then Count of Paris, announced the engagement of Jean, the then Duke of Vendôme, to Maria Magdalena Philomena Juliana Johanna de Tornos y Steinhart, born in Vienna on 19 June 1977. The pair are distantly related, as both are descendants of Count Jaroslav Bořita of Martinice and his first wife, Baroness Maria Eusebia von Sternberg (1584–1634). The civil wedding, conducted by Mayor Rachida Dati, took place on 19 March 2009 in Paris. The religious wedding was held on 2 May 2009 at the Cathédrale Notre-Dame at Senlis, with a reception at the Château de Chantilly. The bride wore a gown by Christian Lacroix and a jacket embroidered by Maison Lesage.

=== Lawsuit ===
In 2021, Jean filed a lawsuit against the Saint-Louis foundation, demanding €1 million in damages and the return of five properties, including the Château d'Amboise. In 1886, the château was bequeathed to the Institute of France by Jean's ancestor Henri d’Orléans, with the caveat that the property would never be altered by the institute. The Saint-Louis foundation was later founded by Jean's grandfather, Henri VI, Count of Paris, in 1974. Jean's lawsuit alleges that the Institute violated their contract to never alter the property, after they announced plans to transform the Pavillon d’Enghien into a €760-a-night luxury hotel, containing a spa and gastronomic restaurant. Jean had previously lived in the château from 2001 to September 2021 rent-free, but was forcefully evicted by the institute after they began to demand he pay rent, which Jean viewed as a violation of their contract.

== Family ==
Jean and his wife Philomena have six children:

- Prince Gaston Louis Antoine Marie d'Orléans, Dauphin of France (born 19 November 2009 in Paris).
- Princess Antoinette Léopoldine Jeanne Marie d'Orléans (born 28 January 2012 in Vienna).
- Princess Louise-Marguerite Eléonore Marie d'Orléans (born 30 July 2014 in Poissy).
- Prince Joseph Gabriel David Marie d'Orléans (born 2 June 2016).
- Princess Jacinthe Élisabeth-Charlotte Marie d'Orléans (born 9 October 2018 in Dreux).
- Prince Alphonse Charles François Marie d'Orléans (born 31 December 2023 in Carcassonne).

== Politics ==
Jean believes that the people of France are "monarchist at heart" and argues that they long for a non-partisan figurehead. He has spoken in support of the Yellow vests protests in France. Jean has also expressed his opposition to same-sex marriage, having participated in the La Manif pour tous protests, as well as abortion. In May 2019, Jean met with French President Emmanuel Macron, Brigitte Macron, and Italian President Sergio Mattarella in his then-home in the Château d'Amboise.

== Titles, styles and honours ==
=== Titles in pretense ===
- 19 May 1965 – 27 September 1987: His Royal Highness Prince Jean of Orléans
- 27 September 1987 – 21 January 2019: His Royal Highness The Duke of Vendôme
- 21 January 2019 – present: His Royal Highness The Count of Paris

He was created Duke of Vendôme (French: Duc de Vendôme) by his paternal grandfather, on 27 September 1987.

Following the death of his father, it was initially thought that Prince Jean would not assume the title of Count of Paris for several months after his father's death, and possibly not for as much as one year.

=== Honours ===
==== National ====
- France: Recipient of the National Defence Medal, 3rd Class

==== Dynastic ====
- (Kingdom of Portugal) Portuguese Royal Family: Knight Grand Cross of the Order of the Immaculate Conception of Vila Viçosa (19 February 2000)
- (Kingdom of the Two Sicilies) House of Bourbon-Two Sicilies Royal Family:
  - Knight of the Illustrious Royal Order of Saint Januarius (19 March 2019, installed 13 May 2019)
  - Knight Grand Cross of Justice of the Sacred Military Constantinian Order of Saint George (22 November 2009, installed 30 May 2011), Bailiff Knight Grand Cross of Justice with Collar (19 March 2019, installed 13 May 2019)

== Ancestry ==
Jean is a direct male-line descendant of Louis Philippe I, the last French king, who in turn was a descendant of Philippe I, Duke of Orléans, the younger brother of Louis XIV. Jean is also descended from Charles X, brother of Louis XVI; and the Bourbons of Spain, the Two Sicilies and Parma.

Ancestors of Jean, Count of Paris

8. Prince Jean, Duke of Guise
4. Prince Henri, Count of Paris
9. Princess Isabelle of Orléans
2. Prince Henri, Count of Paris
10. Pedro de Alcântara, Prince of Grão-Pará
5. Princess Isabelle of Orléans-Braganza
11. Countess Elisabeth Dobrzensky of Dobrzenicz
1. Prince Jean, Count of Paris
12. Albrecht, Duke of Württemberg
6. Philipp Albrecht, Duke of Württemberg
13. Archduchess Margarete Sophie of Austria
3. Duchess Marie-Thérèse of Württemberg
14. Archduke Peter Ferdinand of Austria
7. Archduchess Rosa of Austria
15. Princess Maria Cristina of Bourbon-Two Sicilies

Jean, Count of Paris House of Orléans Cadet branch of the House of Bourbon Born: 19 May 1965
French royalty
Preceded by Henri	Count of Paris; 21 January 2019 – present	Incumbent; Heir apparent: Gaston d'Orléans
Titles in pretence
Preceded by Henri VII	— TITULAR — King of France; 21 January 2019 – present Reason for succession failure: French Revolution of 1848 leads to Abolition of monarchy	Incumbent; Heir apparent: Gaston, Dauphin of France
Preceded by François	— TITULAR — Dauphin of France; 30 December 2017 – 21 January 2019	Succeeded by Gaston
