= Succession to the former French throne (Orléanist) =

The Orléanist claimant to the throne of France is Jean, Count of Paris. He is the uncontested heir to the Orléanist position of "King of the French" held by Louis-Philippe, and is also considered the Legitimist heir as "King of France" by those who view the 1713 Treaty of Utrecht (by which Philip V of Spain renounced for himself and his agnatic descendants any claim to the French throne) as valid. According to the Family Compact of 1909, only the descendants of Henri, Count of Paris (grandfather of the current pretender) are considered to be French dynasts. The founders of the cadet branches of Orleans-Braganza and Orléans-Galliera, by becoming foreigners, are considered under house law to have lost their rights to the throne.

== Rules explaining the order of succession ==
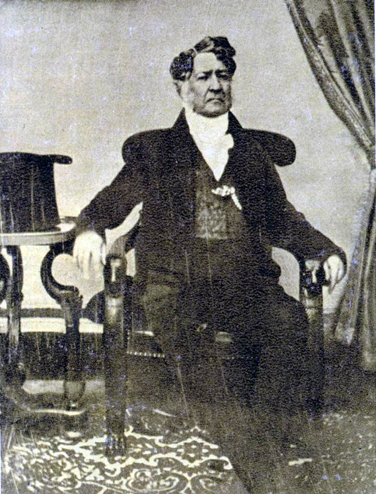
Louis-Phillipe, the last Capetian to sit on the throne of France

=== Succession under the Ancien Regime ===
Prior to the Treaty of Utrecht, rules of succession to the crown of France were deemed to have evolved historically and additively, rather than to have been legislated or amended, constituting part of the fundamental laws of the nation.

1. Inalienability (or indisposability) of the crown: no one has the power to change the dynastic order.
2. Continuity of the crown: a new ruler succeeds as soon as his predecessor dies; the throne is never vacant
3. Heredity: The crown is hereditary in the House of Capet
4. Primogeniture: The elder son is preferred over the younger; the senior descendant represents his deceased ancestor in the line of succession.
5. Masculinity: The heir must be male.
6. Male collaterality: In the absence of male descendants in the King's male line, the closest male collateral relative of the King is the heir.
7. Catholicism: the King must be Catholic.
8. Nationality: the heir must be French.

The succession devolves only upon legally legitimate descendants, born in Catholic marriages. Further, children issuing from marriages expressly forbidden by the king are considered illegitimate.

=== Treaty of Utrecht and the "defect pérégrinité" ===
The Treaty of Utrecht in 1713 caused a breach in the traditional rules of succession to the throne of France. It had been opposed by some members of the Parlement of Paris because, in order to prohibit (on threat of resuming Continental war) the union by inheritance of the kingdoms of France and Spain, it required the exclusion of the Spanish Bourbons from the French throne, which potentially conflicted with the principles of indisposability of the crown and male primogeniture. Nonetheless, termination of the eligibility of Philip V of Spain and his heirs male to inherit the French crown, on the one hand, and international recognition of his retention of the crown of Spain on the other, were agreed to by negotiators for France, Spain and the other European powers who crafted and then obtained ratification of the treaty.

Philip officially signed the renunciation of any future claim for himself and his descendants to the crown of France, and the treaty incorporates the effects of his renunciation. That renunciation was formally ratified by King Louis XIV and registered, pursuant to French law, by the Parlement of Paris. Letters patent issued by Louis XIV in 1700 authorising his grandson Philip to leave France to reign as king over Spain while retaining his French nationality and dynastic rights, were officially revoked. These modifications were never officially repudiated by the organs of government of France.

For monarchists who considered the Treaty of Utrecht valid, the departure of Philip to Spain in order to assume that kingdom's crown, and the retention by his heirs of that throne over the next 300 years, intruded the vice de pérégrinité ("flaw of foreignness") in his dynastic claim to France, excluding himself and his descendants forever from the succession. Finally, Philip's renunciation meant, they believed, that with the death in 1883 of Henri, Count of Chambord, the House of Orléans had become heirs to the Capetian dynasty's claim to the crown of France.

=== Family Compact of 1909 ===
Recognizing the principle of pérégrinité and therefore the impossibility for foreign princes to claim the crown of France, the Orléans claimants and their supporters consider excluded from the succession to the throne the foreign descendants of King Louis-Philippe: the Brazilian House of Orléans-Braganza (descendants of the Comte d'Eu) and the Spanish Orléans-Galliera (descendants of Antoine, Duke of Montpensier).

The 1909 "Family Compact" (Pacte de Famille) was negotiated between the head of the French branch Philippe, Duke of Orléans and the head of the Brazilian branch Gaston, Comte d'Eu, subsequently signed by the adult males of both branches of the Orléans family, save one (Prince Robert, Duke of Chartres, then the oldest member of the family, who died the following year). It confirms the exclusion of members of the Brazilian branch from the French succession on grounds of pérégrinité. Further, it "takes note" of a written promise given by the Comte d'Eu and his son to refrain from asserting any claim to the French throne and to the position of Head of the House of France until the total extinction of all the other dynastic branches of the House of France (the Montpensiers were already deemed excluded).

Alfred de Gramont alleged in his diary, "L'ami du Prince: Journal of a Novel", published by Eric Mension Rigau-Fayard in 2011 that this decision was made by the Orléans for two reasons: first, the desire of other dynasts to exclude the Comte d'Eu and the princes of Orléans-Braganza (who were the heirs presumptive to the Empire of Brazil, and after abolition of the monarchy in 1889, pretenders thereto), and second, the influence of French nationalism. However, exclusion from the French succession as a consequence of permanent emigration to Brazil had been acknowledged and accepted in writing by the Comte d'Eu prior to his marriage to the Princess Imperial of Brazil.

=== Throne of Albania ===
The Orléans were consistent in applying the nationality requirement, as exemplified by an example involving the prospect of acquisition of yet another throne by a member of the family. Albania was emerging as an independent nation in 1913, and sought an appropriate European prince to whom they might offer their new throne. Apparently an approach was made to the younger brother and heir presumptive of the childless Duke of Orléans, Prince Ferdinand, Duke of Montpensier, who responded "There is no crown in the world that could attract me if, to obtain it, I must put into question two titles of which I am rightly proud, that of French citizen and that of French prince. I am resolved to decline any candidacy to the throne of Albania" Eventually, Albania chose Prince William of Wied to wear its crown. He reigned from March to September 1914.

=== Rulings of 2nd Count of Paris ===
Henri, Count of Paris (1908–1999) had amended the order of succession several times within the House of Orléans. Considering the marriages of his sons Michel and Thibaut without his prior approval as misalliances, the Count of Paris excluded them and their descendants from the royal succession in 1967 and 1973.

Later, in 1984, the Count of Paris also excluded his eldest son, Prince Henri (then known as "Count of Clermont") from the succession because of his divorce from Duchess Marie Thérèse of Württemberg and civil remarriage with Micaela Cousiño y Quiñones de León, a divorcée. As Head of the House of Orléans, his father considered that by divorcing and remarrying without obtaining prior approval, his eldest son had excluded himself from the order of succession.

Finally, in 1987, the Count of Paris proclaimed his grandson, Prince Jean, as Duke of Vendôme and heir apparent to the claim to the throne in the places of his father (who was demoted to "Count of Mortain") and of his elder brother, Prince François, who suffered from a mental handicap.

No historical statutory law or precedent was cited as grounds for these changes in the line of succession. Regarding Henri's second marriage, however, the royal right to exclude (as illegitimate) descendants born of marriages of French dynasts contracted in defiance of the King's will had been asserted by Louis XIII, both to the Parlement of Paris and to the Church of France, and was officially accepted by both. The fundamental laws of the ancien regime had not, however, provided for the exclusion from the succession to the crown of dynasts who married without kingly authorization and their descendants, nor of the mentally ill.

Since 1990 relations between the Count of Paris and his eldest son normalized, and Prince Henri was recognized as reinstated in the line of succession to the crown and restored to his dynastic title, "Count of Clermont". Clermont's first wife was accorded the title "Duchess of Montpensier" and retention of her place in the dynasty, while Clermont's second wife was granted the title "Princess de Joinville" with the style of Royal Highness.

=== Rulings of third Count of Paris ===
Becoming the Head of the House of Orléans on his father's death in 1999, the new Count of Paris and "Duke of France" cancelled the dynastic exclusions imposed by his father. Acknowledging that no one has the power to change the order in succession of a prince of the blood royal of France, he recognised his brother, Prince Michel, Count of Évreux and his male-line descendants, and Robert, Count of La Marche, son of his deceased brother Prince Thibaut, Count of La Marche, as possessing succession rights to the French crown, should it ever be restored.

Nevertheless, the new Count of Paris placed the branch of Prince Michel after that of Prince Jacques in the order of succession. It has been argued, however, that since Michel had "seen the day" after his twin brother Jacques, and French primogeniture historically considered the last child to emerge from the womb as senior in the order of birth to other siblings born following a single confinement, this ruling may have been compliant with the tradition of the ancien régime.

Despite the fact that some Orléanists considered that the severe disabilities of Prince François should exclude him from the line of succession, and his younger brother Vendôme was appointed his permanent legal guardian, their father recognized his eldest son as the "Dauphin". François, however, died without issue in 2017, thereby rendering moot the "council of regency" the Count of Paris had created to exercise future dynastic authority in his son's behalf and resolving the public dispute that decision had evoked within the family: In January 2018 the Count of Paris recognized the Duke of Vendôme as his rightful successor.

== See also ==
- History of the French line of succession
- Legitimists
