= Prince François, Count of Clermont =

French prince

Prince François of Orléans
- Born: 7 February 1961; Boulogne-Billancourt
- Died: 30 December 2017 (aged 56); Nantes
- Burial: Chapelle royale de Dreux
- House: Orléans
- Father: Henri, Count of Paris
- Mother: Duchess Marie Therese of Württemberg

Styles of Prince François
- Reference style: His Royal Highness
- Spoken style: Your Royal Highness

Prince François of Orléans, Count of Clermont (François Henri Louis Marie; 7 February 1961 – 30 December 2017) was the eldest son and heir apparent of the Orléanist pretender to the French throne, Prince Henri, Count of Paris, Duke of France and Duchess Marie-Thérèse of Württemberg. François was thus the Dauphin of France in Orléanist reckoning. However, his mother had been infected with toxoplasmosis during her second and third pregnancies, and the pre-natal exposure left both Prince François and his younger sister, Princess Blanche, developmentally disabled.

His godparents were Henri, Count of Paris (paternal grandfather) and Duchess Rosa of Württemberg (maternal grandmother).

== Early life ==
François was about two or three months old, according to his father (then styled Count of Clermont as Orléanist heir apparent), before the family realized that he had a disability. During his early childhood, the family dwelt in Haute-Savoie, although his father was often away on military assignment or business. When he was 13, his parents separated and François spent weekdays in a facility at Beaumont-sur-Oise and, from the early 1980s, in a L'Arche community, rejoining his mother and siblings at the Orléans estate in Dreux on weekends, while sometimes vacationing with his paternal grandmother at the Chateau d'Eu, where she taught him to walk when he was 4 or 5.

In 1981, his grandfather, the Count of Paris, having declared Clermont deprived of his dynastic rights for an unauthorized civil remarriage after divorce, publicly announced that he would be succeeded as claimant to the French throne by Prince Jean, younger brother of François, in light of the latter's incapacity. Although the Count subsequently relented and declared Clermont restored in his rights as the firstborn son, when Clermont succeeded as Count of Paris in 1999, he reinstated François as the next heir on the grounds that his father's act had been ultra vires. He established a council of regency to exercise the dynastic prerogative on François's behalf, to become effective upon the succession of François as claimant. In 2016, Jean declared that his father's appointment of a regency council was invalid and, having become his elder brother's legal guardian, promised to continue to care for him while also called for François "to be left in peace and not used".

== Death ==
On 31 December 2017, Prince Jean reported that after suffering a bad fall the previous day, François had died. Henri subsequently recognized Jean as "the Dauphin", father and son publicly embracing at the interment of François at the Chapelle royale de Dreux on 6 January 2018 following a funeral service attended by his parents, siblings and other members of family, as well as members of reigning and deposed dynasties.

== Ancestry ==
Ancestors of Prince François, Count of Clermont

8. Prince Jean, Duke of Guise
4. Prince Henri, Count of Paris
9. Princess Isabelle of Orléans
2. Prince Henri, Count of Paris
10. Pedro de Alcântara, Prince of Grão-Pará
5. Princess Isabelle of Orléans-Braganza
11. Countess Elisabeth Dobrzensky of Dobrzenicz
1. Prince François, Count of Clermont
12. Albrecht, Duke of Württemberg
6. Philipp Albrecht, Duke of Württemberg
13. Archduchess Margarete Sophie of Austria
3. Duchess Marie Therese of Württemberg
14. Archduke Peter Ferdinand of Austria
7. Archduchess Rosa of Austria
15. Princess Maria Cristina of Bourbon-Two Sicilies

Prince François, Count of Clermont House of Orléans Cadet branch of the House of Bourbon Born: 7 February 1961 Died: 30 December 2017
Titles in pretence
Preceded by Henri (VII)	— TITULAR — Dauphin of France; 19 June 1999 – 30 December 2017	Succeeded by Jean (IV)
