= Maria Christina of Bourbon-Two Sicilies (disambiguation) =

Maria Christina (or Cristina) of Bourbon-Two Sicilies may refer to:

- Maria Christina of the Two Sicilies (1779–1849), Queen consort of Sardinia, daughter of Ferdinand I of the Two Sicilies and Maria Carolina of Austria
- Maria Christina of the Two Sicilies (1806–1878), Queen consort of Spain, daughter of Francis I of the Two Sicilies and Maria Isabella of Spain
- Princess Maria Cristina of Bourbon-Two Sicilies (1877–1947), titular Grand Duchess consort of Tuscany, daughter of Prince Alfonso, Count of Caserta and Princess Antonietta of Bourbon-Two Sicilies
