= Duchess Marie-Thérèse of Württemberg =

Marie-Thérèse
- Duchess of Montpensier
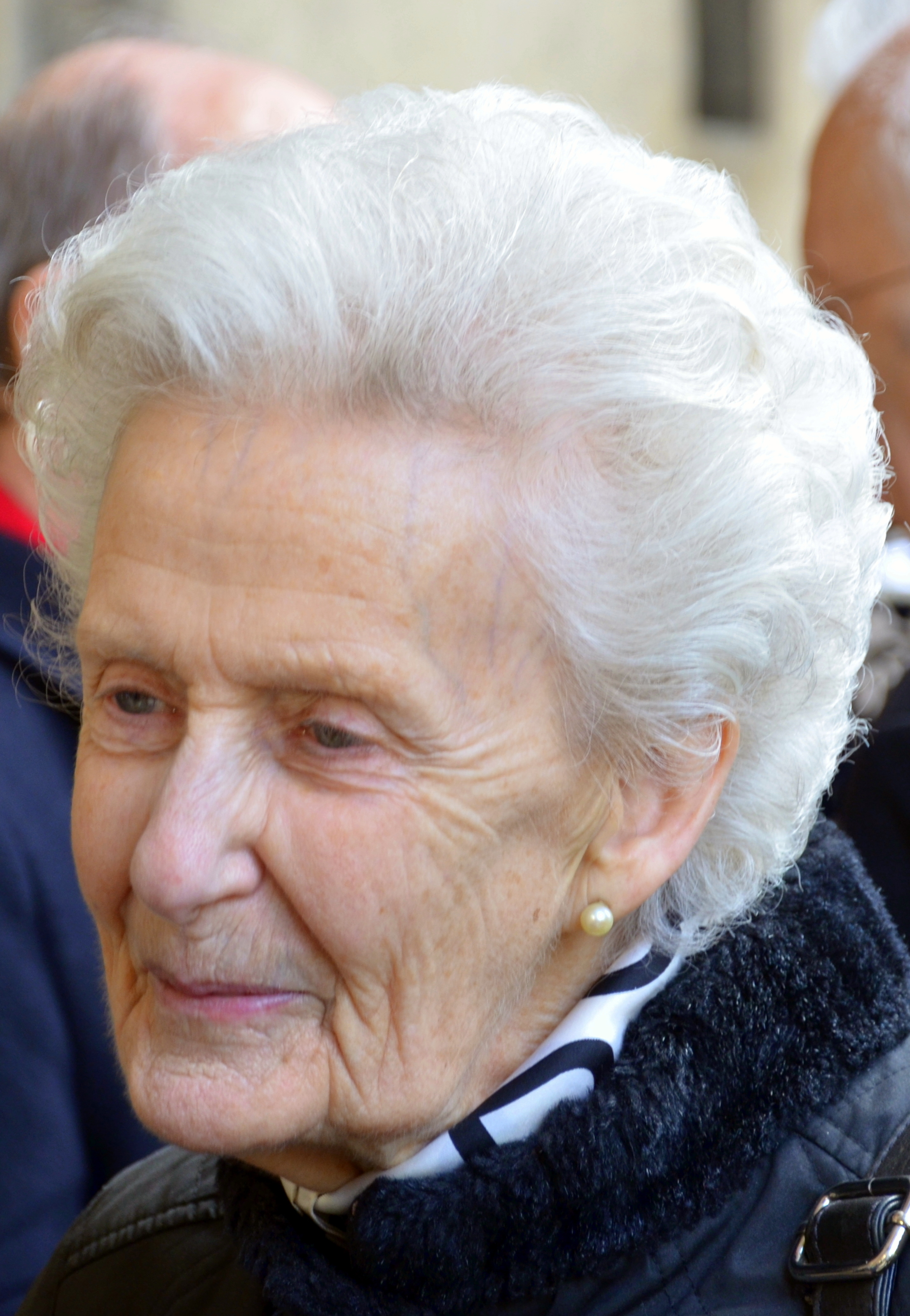
- Marie-Thérèse in 2019

Consort of the Orléanist pretender to the French throne (per Canon law)
- Tenure: 19 June 1999 – 13 November 2008
- Born: 12 November 1934 (age 91); Schloss Altshausen, Altshausen, Free People's State of Württemberg, Nazi Germany
- Spouse: Prince Henri, Count of Clermont (m. 1957; div. 1984)
- Issue: Princess Marie of Liechtenstein; Prince François, Count of Clermont; Princess Blanche; Prince Jean, Count of Paris; Prince Eudes, Duke of Angoulême
Names
- Marie-Thérèse Nadejda Albertine Rosa Philippine Margarethe Christine Helene Josepha Martina Leopoldine
- House: Württemberg
- Father: Philipp Albrecht, Duke of Württemberg
- Mother: Archduchess Rosa of Austria

Duchess Marie-Thérèse of Württemberg (German: Marie Therese Nadejda Albertine Rosa Philippine Margarethe Christine Helene Josepha Martina Leopoldine Herzogin von Württemberg; born 12 November 1934) is a German-born aristocrat. A daughter of the claimant to the royal throne of Württemberg, abolished in 1918, she was the first wife of Prince Henri, Count of Clermont. Marie-Thérèse is the mother of Prince Jean, Duke of Vendôme, head of the House of Orléans and Orléanist claimant to the French throne.

== Family ==
Marie Thérèse was the fifth child and fourth daughter of Philipp Albrecht, Duke of Württemberg, and his second wife, Archduchess Rosa of Austria, Princess of Tuscany. She was born at Altshausen Castle, Baden-Württemberg, Germany.

== Marriage and issue ==
Marie Thérèse married Prince Henri, Count of Clermont, eldest son of Henri, Count of Paris, and Princess Isabelle of Orléans-Braganza, on 5 July 1957 in Dreux, France. Three years later, her younger brother Carl, Duke of Württemberg, would marry Henri's younger sister, Princess Diane d'Orléans.

Marie Thérèse and Henri had five children:

1. Princess Marie d'Orléans (born 3 January 1959), married to Prince Gundakar of Liechtenstein (born 1949), son of Prince Prince Johann Baptist of Liechtenstein (1914–2004) and Princess Clothilde of Thurn und Taxis (1922–2009).
2. Prince François, Count of Clermont (7 February 1961 – 30 December 2017), severely disabled from toxoplasmosis.
3. Princess Blanche d'Orléans (born 10 September 1962, Ravensburg), severely disabled from toxoplasmosis.
4. Prince Jean, Count of Paris (born 19 May 1965), married to Philomena de Tornos y Steinhart (born 19 June 1977)
5. Prince Eudes, Duke of Angoulême (born 18 March 1968), married to Countess Marie-Liesse de Rohan-Chabot (born 29 June 1969), daughter of Count Louis Meriadec de Rohan-Chabot (b. 1937) and Princess Isabelle de Bauffremont-Marnay (b. 1944).

Marie Thérèse and Henri were legally separated on 23 February 1977, divorced on 3 February 1984. She received the title Duchess of Montpensier from her former father-in-law after divorce.

Duchess Marie-Thérèse of Württemberg House of Württemberg Born: 12 November 1934
Titles in pretence
Preceded by Isabelle of Orléans-Braganza	— TITULAR — Queen consort of France; 19 June 1999 – 13 November 2008	Vacant Title next held by Micaëla Cousiño Quiñones de León
