= Diane, Duchess of Württemberg =

Diane
- Dowager Duchess of Württemberg
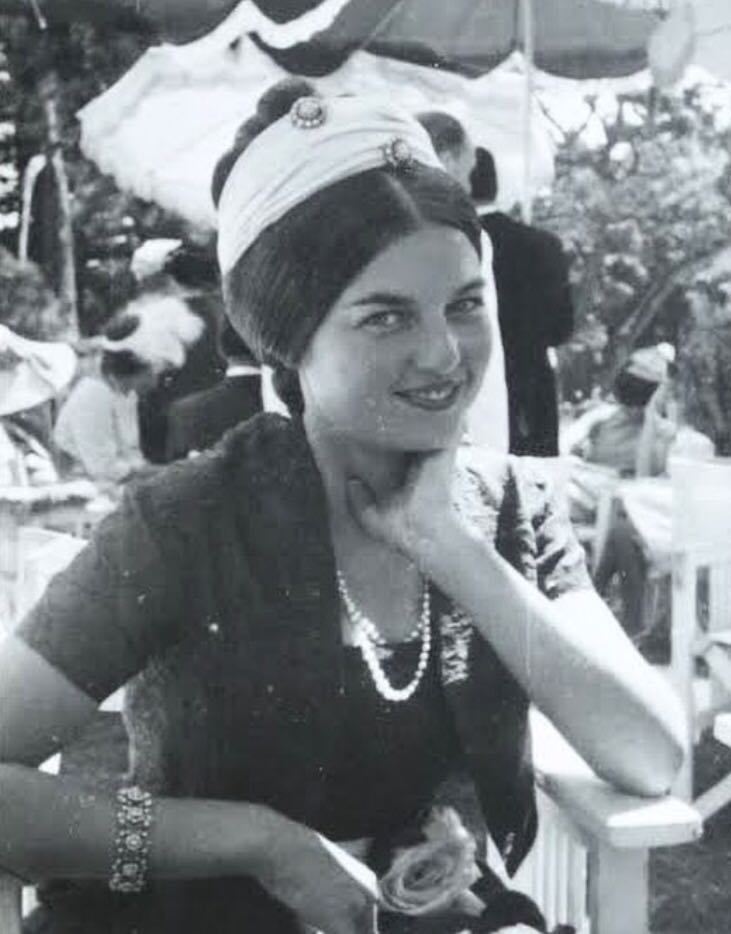
- Diane in July 1964
- Born: Diane d'Orléans; 24 March 1940 (age 86); Petrópolis, Brazil
- Spouse: Carl, Duke of Württemberg (m. 1960; died 2022)
- Issue Detail: Friedrich, Hereditary Duke of Württemberg; Mathilde, Princess of Waldburg-Zeil-Trauchburg; Duke Eberhart; Duke Philipp; Duke Michael; Duchess Fleur, Countess von Goëss
Names
- Diane Françoise Maria da Gloria Herzogin von Württemberg
- House: Orléans
- Father: Henri, Count of Paris
- Mother: Princess Isabelle of Orléans-Braganza

Diane, Dowager Duchess of Württemberg (née Princess Diane of Orléans; born 24 March 1940) is a French-German painter, sculptor, writer and philanthropist. She is the widow of Carl, Duke of Württemberg, head of the House of Württemberg. She is the fourth daughter and sixth child of Henri, Count of Paris, Orléanist pretender to the throne of France, and Princess Isabelle of Orléans-Braganza.

== Early life ==
Diane was born in Petrópolis, Brazil, the fourth daughter and sixth child of the Orléanist claimant to the French throne, Henri, Count of Paris, and his wife, Princess Isabelle of Orléans-Braganza. At the time of her birth, as a claimant to the throne, her father was banned from living in France. Thus, she was born in her mother's native Brazil. In 1950, the ban was lifted and the family moved to France. Diane attended the Académie Julian in Paris.

== Career and patronages ==
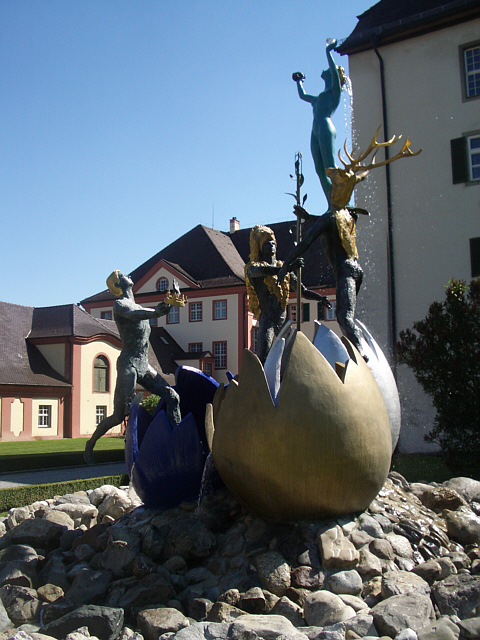
Geburt der Isis by Diane, Duchess of Württemberg, 1989–90, Altshausen.

The Duchess became interested in silk painting at the age of 14. She received formal training at the Académie Julian. She worked in a variety of techniques such as silk screen printing, oil painting, stuccowork, glass and wood painting. In 1971, following an illness caused by using lead-based paints, Diane began sculpting. She signs her works as DxDiane. The letter D placed before Diane signifies Dimanche de Pâques, the day of her birth. She is a patron of the Smolny Institute of Liberal Arts and Science.

In 1979, the Duchess established an eponymous foundation, "Diane Herzogin von Württemberg, Prinzessin von Frankreich-Stiftung," to aid disadvantaged children.

== Marriage and issue ==
In 1956, on a cruise organized by Queen Frederica of Greece, Diane met Duke Carl of Württemberg, son and heir of Philipp Albrecht, Duke of Württemberg, and his wife, Archduchess Rosa of Austria. In 1957, her brother, Henri, married Carl's sister, Marie-Thérèse.

On 21 July 1960, Diane married Carl at Altshausen. The wedding celebrations lasted three days. Diane wore a Dior gown designed by Yves Saint Laurent.

In 1975, Carl succeeded his father as head of the House of Württemberg.

They have six children and sixteen grandchildren:

- Friedrich Philipp Carl Franz Maria, Hereditary Duke of Württemberg (Friedrichshafen, 1 June 1961 – near Ebenweiler, 9 May 2018). He married in Altshausen on 11 November 1993 to Princess Wilhelmine Friederike Pauline Elisabeth Marie of Wied (born Munich, 27 December 1973), with issue:
  - Wilhelm Friedrich Carl Philipp Albert Nikolaus Erich Maria, Duke of Württemberg (Ravensburg, 13 August 1994), succeeded his grandfather as head of the House of Württemberg in 2022
  - Duchess Marie-Amélie Diane Katharina Beatrix Philippa Sophie (Ravensburg, 12 March 1996). She is married to Baron Franz-Ferdinand von Feilitzsch.
  - Duchess Sophie Dorothée Martina Johanna Henriette Charitas Maria (Ravensburg, 19 August 1997)
- Duchess Mathilde Marie-Antoinette Rosa Isabelle (b. Friedrichshafen, 11 July 1962). She married in 1988 to Erich, Prince of Waldburg zu Zeil und Trauchburg (b. 1962), with issue.
- Duke Eberhard Alois Nikolaus Heinrich Johannes Maria (b. Friedrichshafen, 20 June 1963). He married in 2011 (divorced in 2016) to Lucia Desiree Copf (b. Samedan, 29 December 1969), and married secondly in 2023 Gaby Maier (b. 1970), with issue (from his first marriage).
- Duke Philipp Albrecht Christoph Ulrich Maria (b. Friedrichshafen, 1 November 1964). He married in 1991 to Duchess Marie-Caroline in Bavaria, with issue.
- Duke Michael Heinrich Albert Alexander Maria (b. Friedrichshafen, 1 December 1965). He married in 2006 to Julia Ricarda Storz (b. Munich, 4 April 1965), without issue.
- Duchess Eleonore Fleur Juanita Charlotte Eudoxie Marie-Agnès (b. Altshausen, 4 November 1977). She married in 2003 to Count Moritz von Goëss (b. 1966), with issue.

== Honours and awards ==
=== Honours ===
==== National honours ====
- France: Member of the Order of the Legion of Honour, 2010
- Baden-Württemberg: Member of the Decoration of Merit, 2011

==== Foreign honours ====
- Italy
  - Sovereign Military Order of Malta: Knight Grand Cross of the Order of Merit, 2000
  - Vatican: Knight Commander of the Order of Saint Sylvester

=== Awards ===
- Prix Européen de la Culture, 1999
- "DODO" Prize for Women, 2003
- Montblanc de la Culture Arts Patronage Award, 2005
- Honorary Doctorate, Saint Petersburg State University, 2010

== Works ==
- I.K.H. Diane Herzogin von Württemberg, Prinzessin von Frankreich; Diane Herzogin von Württemberg, Roger Orlik; Sp-Verlag (2002) ISBN 3-9807873-0-3
- Kunsthandwerk, Gemälde, Skulpturen; Diane von Württemberg; Ulm : Süddt. Verl.-Ges., 1991. ISBN 3-88294-165-0

Diane, Duchess of Württemberg House of Orléans Born: 24 March 1940
Titles in pretence
Preceded by Archduchess Rosa of Austria	— TITULAR — Queen consort of Württemberg; 17 April 1975 – 7 June 2022; Reason for succession failure: Kingdom abolished in 1918	Vacant
