= Wilhelm, Duke of Württemberg =

German duke

Wilhelm Herzog von Württemberg
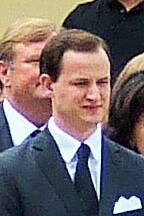
- Wilhelm in 2022

Head of the House of Württemberg
- Tenure: 7 June 2022 – present
- Predecessor: Carl
- Heir presumptive: Eberhard
- Born: 13 August 1994 (age 32); Ravensburg, Germany
Names
- Wilhelm Friedrich Carl Philipp Albert Nikolaus Erich Maria Herzog von Württemberg
- House: Württemberg
- Father: Duke Friedrich of Württemberg
- Mother: Princess Marie of Wied
- Religion: Catholic

Wilhelm Herzog von Württemberg (born Wilhelm Friedrich Carl Philipp Albert Nikolaus Erich Maria; 13 August 1994) is the head of the House of Württemberg and a German businessman. He is Chair of the Hofkammer des Hauses Württemberg, the company which manages the forests, farms, wineries, and housing estates of the former royal family of the Kingdom of Württemberg.

== Life ==
Wilhelm is the eldest child of Friedrich, Hereditary Duke of Württemberg (1961–2018) and Princess Marie Wilhelmine of Wied (born 1973). He was baptised in September 1994, with his uncles Erich, Prince of Waldburg zu Zeil und Trauchburg, and Prince Wilhelm of Wied, as his godfathers.

He has two younger sisters, Duchess Marie Amelie (born 1996, who married in 2023 Baron Franz-Ferdinand von Feilitzsch) and Duchess Sophie Dorothee (born 1997).

On 9 May 2018, Wilhelm's father died in a car accident while driving on his way home to Friedrichshafen. Upon the death of his father, Wilhelm became the heir apparent to his grandfather, Carl, Duke of Württemberg as Head of the House of Württemberg.

In July 2019, it was also announced that Wilhelm would be the future head of the Württemberg Hofkammer, the administrative offices of the family business.

On 7 June 2022, Wilhelm succeeded as Head of the House of Württemberg upon the death of his grandfather, Carl, Duke of Württemberg.

Wilhelm is unmarried. With the headship of the house passing through the male line, the heir presumptive of the House of Württemberg is Wilhelm's paternal uncle Duke Eberhard of Württemberg, who married Gaby Maier on 15 July 2023.

Wilhelm, Duke of Württemberg House of Württemberg Born: 13 August 1994
Titles in pretence
Preceded by Duke Carl	— TITULAR — King of Württemberg; 7 June 2022 – present Reason for succession failure: Kingdom abolished in 1918	Incumbent
