= Princess Isabelle of Orléans-Braganza =

Countess of Paris (1911–2003)

Isabelle of Orléans-Braganza
- Countess of Paris
- Isabelle in 1936

Consort of the Orléanist pretender to the French throne
- Pretendence: 25 August 1940 – 19 June 1999
- Born: Isabelle of Orléans-Braganza; 13 August 1911; Château d'Eu, Eu, Seine-Maritime, France
- Died: 5 July 2003 (aged 91); Paris, France
- Burial: Chapelle royale de Dreux
- Spouse: Prince Henri, Count of Paris (m. 1931; died 1999)
- Issue: Princess Isabelle, Countess of Schönborn-Buchheim; Prince Henri, Count of Paris; Princess Hélène, Countess of Limburg-Stirum; Prince François, Duke of Orléans; Anne, Dowager Duchess of Calabria; Diane, Dowager Duchess of Württemberg; Prince Michel, Count of Évreux; Prince Jacques, Duke of Orléans; Princess Claude, Mrs Gandolfi; Princess Chantal, Baroness de Sambucy de Sorgue; Prince Thibaut, Count of La Marche
Names
- Isabelle Marie Amélie Louise Victoire Thérèse Jeanne
- House: Orléans-Braganza
- Father: Pedro de Alcântara, Prince of Grão-Pará
- Mother: Countess Elisabeth Dobrzensky of Dobrzenicz

Princess Isabelle of Orléans-Braganza (Isabelle Marie Amélie Louise Victoire Thérèse Jeanne; 13 August 1911 – 5 July 2003) was a princess of the House of Orléans-Braganza and, by marriage, the consort of the Orléanist claimant to the French throne, Henri, Count of Paris. She was the daughter of Pedro de Alcântara, Prince of Grão-Pará, a pretender to the defunct throne of the Brazilian Empire, and thus a member of the former Brazilian imperial family. Through her marriage, she became a prominent figure linking the Brazilian and French royal houses and played a representative role within Orléanist circles in exile during the 20th century.

== Early life ==
Isabelle in her mother's arms, c. 1911

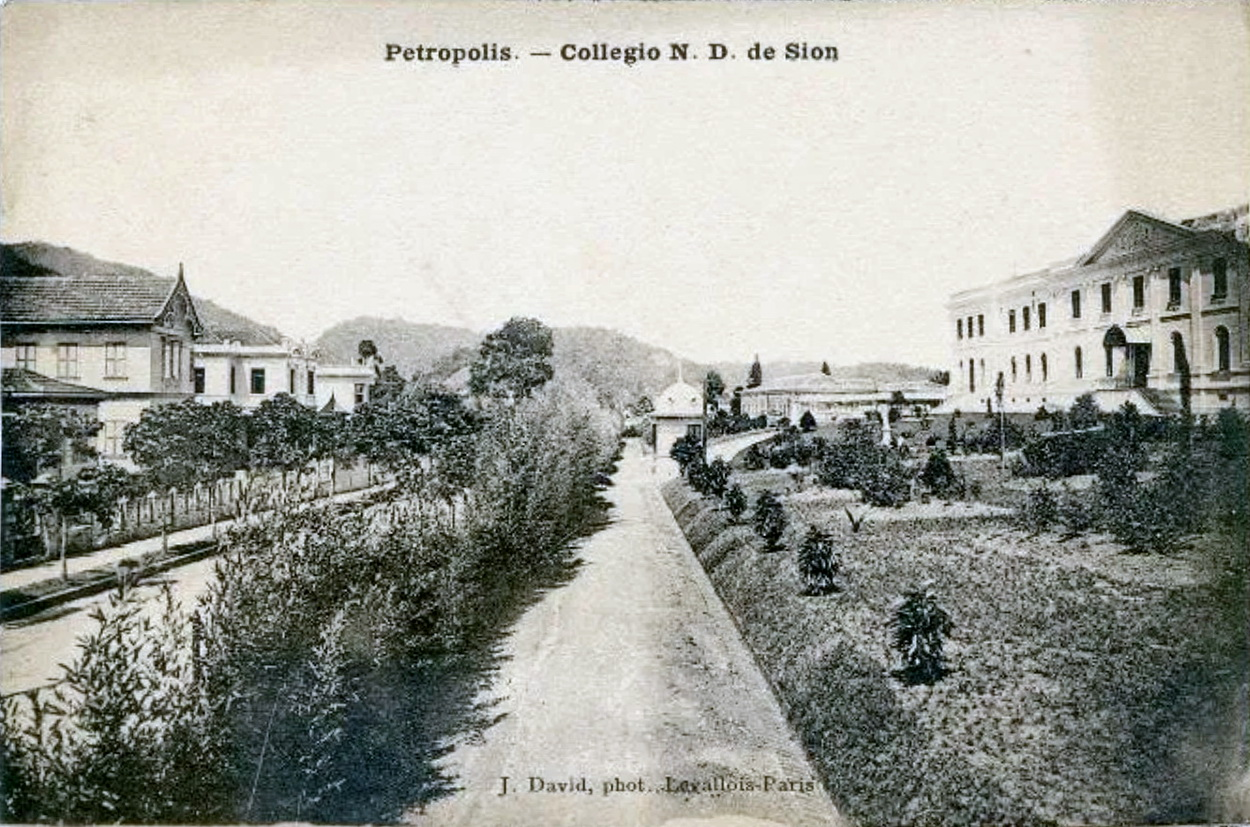
Colégio Nossa Senhora de Sion (Ecole Notre-Dame-de-Sion; right), Petrópolis, Brazil, 1906

Isabelle was born on 13 August 1911, the eldest daughter of Dom Pedro de Alcântara, Prince of Grão-Pará, erstwhile heir to the throne of the Empire of Brazil, and his wife, Countess Elisabeth Dobrzensky of Dobrzenicz. Her father was the eldest son of Isabel, Princess Imperial of Brazil, the elder daughter and heiress of Emperor Pedro II of Brazil, and Gaston, Count of Eu, grandson of King Louis Philippe I of France. Isabelle was born in a pavilion on the grounds of the Château d'Eu, her paternal grandfather's home in the town of Eu in the Seine-Maritime department of France in Normandy. She was named after her paternal grandmother, the Princess Imperial.

In 1891, Dom Pedro de Alcântara became Prince Imperial of Brazil according to royalist supporters when his mother became claimant to the throne upon the death of the emperor in exile. In 1908, he renounced his succession rights, and those of his descendants, to marry Bohemian noblewoman Countess Elisabeth Dobrzensky of Dobrzenicz. Though his mother withheld dynastic consent, his parents attended his wedding. However, with the agreement of the Duke of Orléans, head of the House of Orléans to which he belonged paternally, he and his descendants retained the right to be titled Prince/ss of Orléans-Braganza.

After the deaths of her maternal grandparents, Isabelle's parents moved from the Pavillon des Ministres on the castle grounds into the main Chateau. They spent the winter months in a townhouse in Boulogne-sur-Seine. In 1924, her father's cousin, Prince Adam Czartoryski, placed at the family's disposal, apartments in the palatial Hôtel Lambert on the Île Saint-Louis in Paris, where Isabelle and her siblings undertook their studies. The family travelled extensively and much of Isabelle's youth was spent visiting her maternal relatives at their large estate in Chotěboř, Austria, and Goluchow, Poland. With her father, Isabelle visited Naples, Constantinople, Rhodes, Smyrna, Lebanon, Syria, Cairo, Palestine and Jerusalem.

In 1920, Brazil lifted the law of banishment against its former dynasty and invited them to bring home the remains of Pedro II, although Isabelle's grandfather, the Count of Eu, died at sea during the voyage. But after annual visits over the next decade, her parents decided to repatriate their family to Petrópolis permanently, where Isabelle attended day school at Notre-Dame-de-Sion while the family took up residence at the old imperial Grão Pará Palace. Until then, Isabelle was privately educated by governesses and tutors.

== Marriage ==
Isabelle first met her third cousin, Prince Henri of Orléans, heir to the headship of the House of Orléans, in 1920 at the home of the Dowager Duchess of Chartres, Henri's grandmother who was also a cousin of both of Isabelle's grandparents. In the summer of 1923, Henri was a guest at the Chateau d'Eu, at which time Isabelle, aged 12, resolved that she would one day marry him. However, he took no apparent notice of her at the wedding of his sister, Anne, to the Duke of Aosta at Naples in 1927. During a visit to his parents' home, the Manoir d'Anjou in Brussels, over Easter 1928, Henri began to show interest in Isabelle, and even more at a family reunion in July 1929.

Henri proposed to Isabelle on 10 August 1930 while taking part in a hunt at Count Dobržensky's Chotěboř home. The couple kept their engagement a secret until a family gathering at Attersee later that summer, but were obliged by the Duke of Guise to wait until Henri finished his studies at Louvain University before the betrothal was officially announced 28 December 1930.

On 8 April 1931, Isabelle and Henri were married at Palermo Cathedral; she was 19, and he was 22. The wedding was held in Sicily, since the law of banishment against the heirs of France's former dynasties had not yet been abrogated. The two families selected Palermo because Henri's family owned a palace there, which had been the location of three earlier weddings. The wedding gave rise to several royalist demonstrations, and the road leading to the cathedral was lined with hundreds of visitors from France who viewed Henri as the rightful heir to the French throne. He was greeted with such cries as "Vive le roi, Vive la France" along with other monarchist cries and songs. These supporters were joined by 1,200 guests including members of the bride and groom's families, along with representatives of other royal dynasties.

== Later life ==
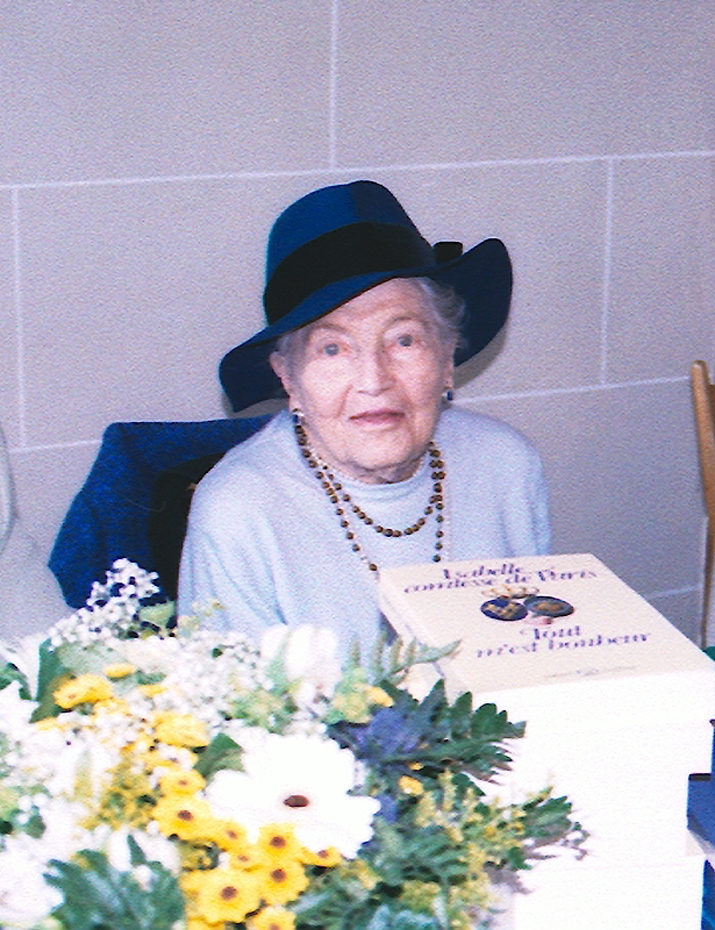
Isabelle at a book signing, 1998

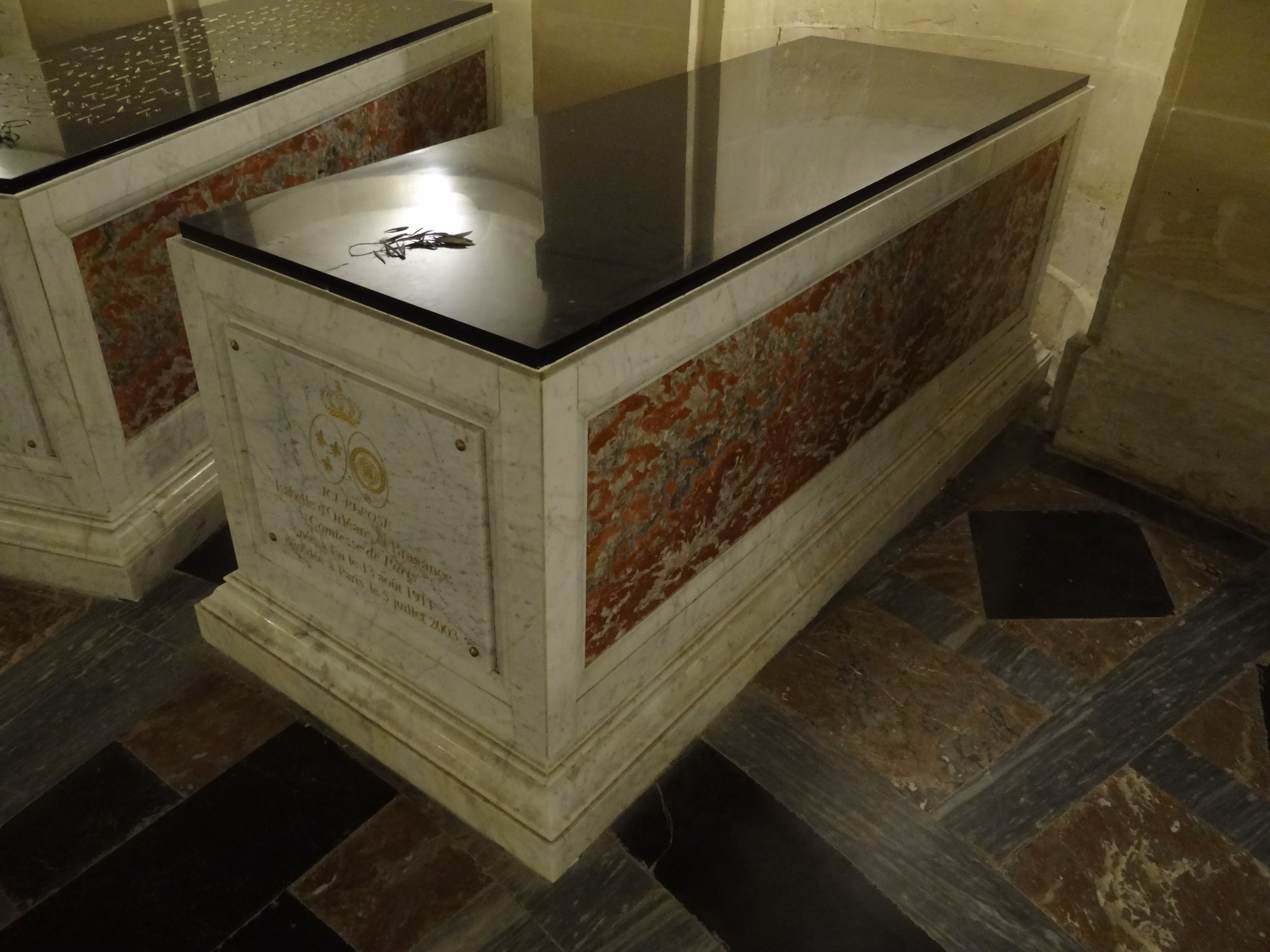
Tomb of Isabelle in the Royal Chapel of Dreux

Henri became pretender to the throne of France upon the death of his father, the Duke of Guise, in 1940. In 1947, Henri and Isabel's family took up residence at the Quinta do Anjinho, an estate in Sintra, on the Portuguese Riviera. In 1950, the law of banishment was repealed and the family moved to Paris. With five of their children they took part in the ship tour organized by King Paul of Greece and Queen Frederica in 1954, which became known as the "Cruise of the Kings" and was attended by over 100 royals from all over Europe.

Isabelle, called Madame, and her husband used the French Royal coat of arms. She survived her late husband by four years.

== Issue ==
Name	Birth	Death	Notes
Princess Isabelle Marie Laure Victoire	8 April 1932		married Friedrich Karl, Count of Schönborn-Buchheim.
Prince Henri Philippe Pierre Marie	14 June 1933	21 January 2019	married Duchess Marie Thérèse of Württemberg.
Princess Hélène Astrid Léopoldine Marie	17 September 1934		married Count Evrard de Limburg-Stirum.
Prince François Gaston Michel Marie, Duke of Orléans	15 August 1935	11 October 1960	Died fighting for France in Algeria.
Princess Anne Marguerite Brigitte Marie	4 December 1938		married Infante Carlos, Duke of Calabria.
Princess Diane Françoise Maria da Gloria	24 March 1940		married Carl, Duke of Württemberg.
Prince Michel Joseph Benoît Marie	25 June 1941		married Béatrice Pasquier de Franclieu. Michel and Béatrice are the parents of Charles-Philippe d'Orléans.
Prince Jacques Jean Yaroslaw Marie, Duke of Orléans	25 June 1941		married Gersende de Sabran-Pontevès.
Princess Claude Marie Agnès Catherine	11 December 1943		married Prince Amedeo of Savoy, Duke of Aosta.
Princess Jeanne de Chantal Alice Clothilde Marie	9 January 1946		married (Baron) François Xavier de Sambucy de Sorgue.
Prince Thibaut Louis Denis Humbert	20 January 1948	23 March 1983	married Marion Mercedes Gordon-Orr.

== Selected publications ==
- Isabelle, comtesse de Paris (1978). Tout m'est bonheur. Paris: Éditions Robert Laffont. ISBN 2221001079.
- Isabelle, comtesse de Paris (1993). Moi, Marie-Antoinette. Paris: R. Laffont. ISBN 2221074858.
- Isabelle, comtesse de Paris (1998). La reine Marie-Amélie grand-mère de l'Europe. Paris: Perrin. ISBN 2262014515.

Princess Isabelle of Orléans-Braganza House of Orléans-Braganza Cadet branch of the House of Orléans Born: 13 August 1911 Died: 5 July 2003
Titles in pretence
Preceded by Isabelle of Orléans	— TITULAR — Queen consort of France; 25 August 1940 – 19 June 1999	Succeeded by Duchess Marie-Thérèse of Württemberg
