= Princess Maria Cristina of Bourbon-Two Sicilies =

Princess Maria Cristina
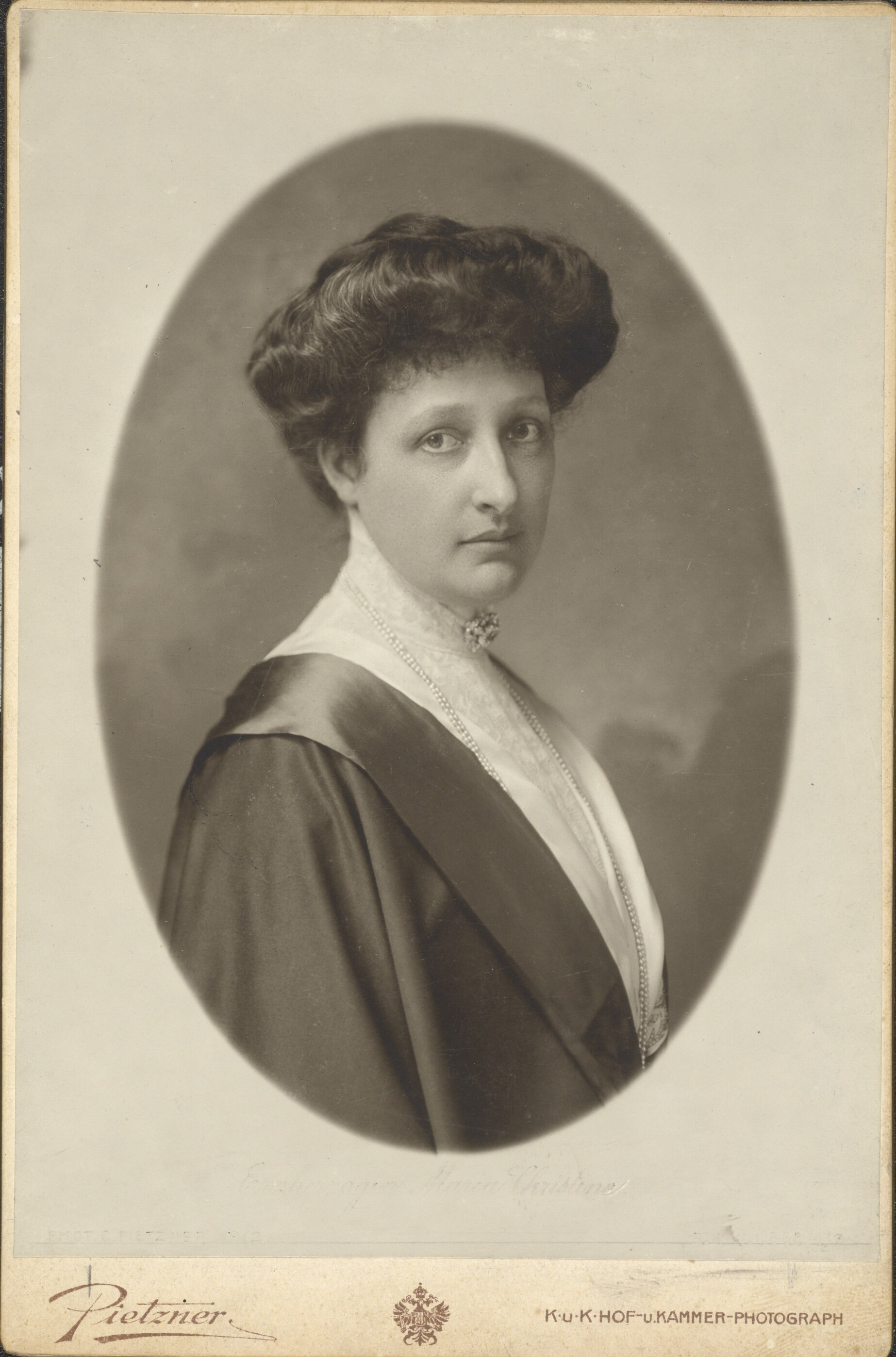
- Portrait by Carl Pietzner, c. 1900

Grand Duchess consort of Tuscany
- Tenure: 28 February 1942 – 4 October 1947
- Born: 10 April 1877; Cannes, France
- Died: 4 October 1947 (aged 70); St. Gilgen, Salzburg, Austria
- Spouse: Archduke Peter Ferdinand, Prince of Tuscany (m. 1900)
- Issue: Archduke Gottfried; Helena, Hereditary Duchess of Württemberg; Archduke Georg; Rosa, Duchess of Württemberg
Names
- Italian: Maria Cristina Carolina Pia Carmela Giuseppa Antonia Anna Luitgarda Speranza Lucia Caterina Apollonia Cecilia Agata di Borbone
- House: Bourbon-Two Sicilies
- Father: Prince Alfonso, Count of Caserta
- Mother: Maria Antonietta of the Two Sicilies

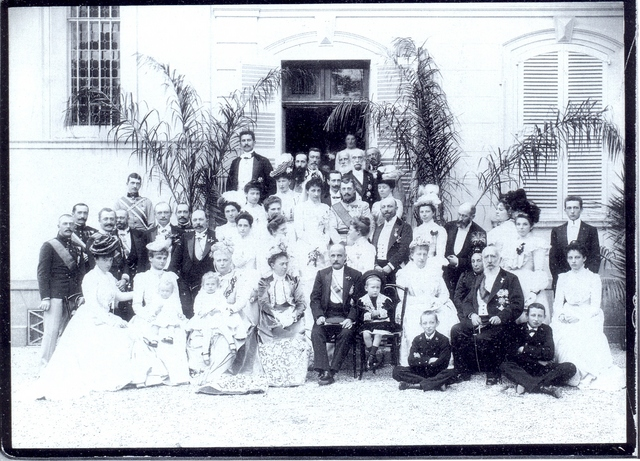
Marriage photo of Archduke Peter and Princess Maria Christina

Princess Maria Cristina of Bourbon-Two Sicilies (Full Italian name: Maria Cristina Carolina Pia Carmela Giuseppa Antonia Anna Luitgarda Speranza Lucia Caterina Apollonia Cecilia Agata di Borbone; 10 April 1877 – 4 October 1947) was the titular Grand Duchess of Tuscany from 28 February 1942 to 4 October 1947 as wife of Archduke Peter Ferdinand of Austria, Prince of Tuscany, the titular Grand Duke.

== Family ==
Born into the Sicilian line of an ancient House of Bourbon, Princess Maria Cristina was the fifth child and second eldest daughter of Prince Alfonso of Bourbon-Two Sicilies, Count of Caserta and his wife, Princess Maria Antonietta of Bourbon-Two Sicilies.

== Marriage and issue ==
Maria Cristina married Archduke Peter Ferdinand of Austria, Prince of Tuscany, fourth child and third son of Ferdinand IV, Grand Duke of Tuscany and his wife Princess Alice of Bourbon-Parma, on 8 November 1900 in Cannes.

Maria Cristina and Peter Ferdinand had four children:

1. Archduke Gottfried of Austria, Prince of Tuscany (14 March 1902 - 21 January 1984) married Princess Dorothea Therese of Bavaria and had issue:
  1. Archduchess Elisabeth of Austria, Princess of Tuscany (born 2 October 1939)
  2. Archduchess Alice of Austria, Princess of Tuscany (born 29 April 1941)
  3. Archduke Leopold Franz of Austria, Prince of Tuscany (25 October 1942 - 23 June 2021)
  4. Archduchess Maria Antoinette of Austria, Princess of Tuscany (born 16 September 1950)
2. Archduchess Helena of Austria, Princess of Tuscany (30 October 1903 - 8 September 1924) married Philipp Albrecht, Hereditary Duke of Württemberg and had issue:
  1. Duchess Maria Christina of Württemberg (born 2 September 1924)
3. Archduke Georg of Austria, Prince of Tuscany (22 August 1905 - 21 March 1952) married Countess Marie Valerie of Waldburg-Zeil-Hohenems and had issue:
  1. Archduke Guntram of Austria, Prince of Tuscany (19 August 1937 - 21 April 1944)
  2. Archduke Radbot of Austria, Prince of Tuscany (born 23 September 1938)
  3. Archduchess Marie Christine of Austria, Princess of Tuscany (8 April 1941 - 4 January 1942)
  4. Archduchess Walburga of Austria, Princess of Tuscany (born 23 July 1942)
  5. Archduchess Verena of Austria, Princess of Tuscany (21 June 1944 - 5 January 1945)
  6. Archduke Johann of Austria, Prince of Tuscany (born and died 27 December 1946)
  7. Archduchess Katharina of Austria, Princess of Tuscany (born 24 April 1948)
  8. Archduchess Agnes of Austria, Princess of Tuscany (born 20 April 1950)
  9. Archduke Georg of Austria, Prince of Tuscany (born 28 August 1952)
4. Archduchess Rosa of Austria, Princess of Tuscany (22 September 1906 - 17 September 1983) married Philipp Albrecht, Duke of Württemberg and had issue:
  1. Duchess Helene of Württemberg (29 June 1929 - 22 April 2021)
  2. Duke Ludwig Albrecht of Württemberg (23 October 1930 - 6 October 2019)
  3. Duchess Elisabeth of Württemberg (2 February 1933 - 27 January 2022)
  4. Duchess Marie-Thérèse of Württemberg (born 12 November 1934)
  5. Carl, Duke of Württemberg (1 August 1936 - 7 June 2022)
  6. Duchess Maria Antonia of Württemberg (31 August 1937 - 12 November 2004)

== Death ==
Archduchess Maria Christina died in Landkreis Starnberg, Bavaria, on 4 October 1947, at the age of 70. Her body was buried in the Cemetery of St. Gilgen, Salzburg, Austria.

== Ancestry ==
Ancestors of Princess Maria Cristina of Bourbon-Two Sicilies

8. Francis I of the Two Sicilies
4. Ferdinand II of the Two Sicilies
9. Infanta Maria Isabella of Spain
2. Prince Alfonso, Count of Caserta
10. Archduke Charles, Duke of Teschen
5. Archduchess Maria Theresa of Austria
11. Princess Henrietta of Nassau-Weilburg
1. Princess Maria Cristina of Bourbon-Two Sicilies
12. Francis I of the Two Sicilies (= 8)
6. Prince Francis, Count of Trapani
13. Infanta Maria Isabella of Spain (= 9)
3. Princess Maria Antonietta of Bourbon-Two Sicilies
14. Leopold II, Grand Duke of Tuscany
7. Archduchess Maria Isabella of Austria
15. Princess Maria Antonia of the Two Sicilies

Princess Maria Cristina of Bourbon-Two Sicilies House of Bourbon-Two Sicilies Cadet branch of the House of Bourbon Born: 10 April 1877 Died: 4 October 1947
Titles in pretence
Vacant Title last held by Alicia of Parma	— TITULAR — Grand Duchess of Tuscany; 28 February 1942 – 4 October 1947; Reason for succession failure: Italian Unification under the House of Savoy	Vacant Title next held by Princess Dorothea of Bavaria
