= Carl, Duke of Württemberg =

German member of former royal family (1936–2022)

Carl Herzog von Württemberg
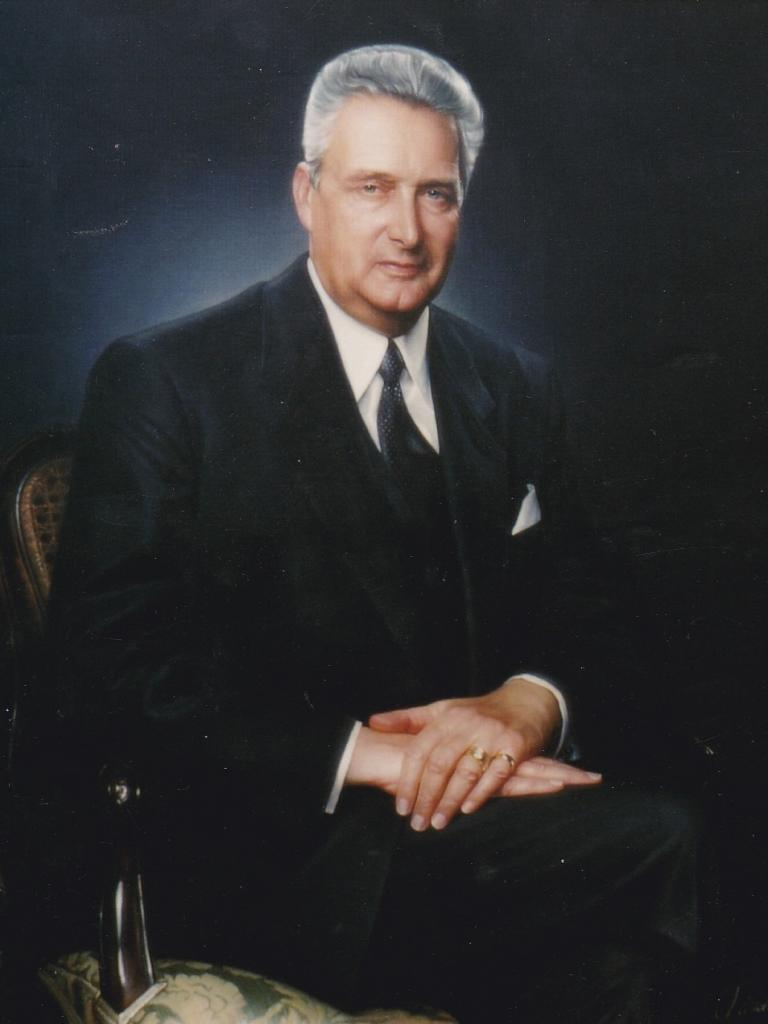

Head of the House of Württemberg
- Tenure: 15 April 1975 – 7 June 2022
- Predecessor: Duke Philipp Albrecht
- Successor: Duke Wilhelm
- Born: 1 August 1936; Friedrichshafen, Württemberg, Germany
- Died: 7 June 2022 (aged 85); Ravensburg, Baden-Württemberg, Germany
- Spouse: Princess Diane d'Orléans (m. 1960)
- Issue: Duke Friedrich; Duchess Mathilde; Duke Eberhard; Duke Philipp; Duke Michael; Duchess Eleonore
Names
- Carl Maria Peter Ferdinand Philipp Albrecht Joseph Michael Pius Konrad Robert Ulrich Herzog von Württemberg
- House: Württemberg
- Father: Philipp Albrecht, Duke of Württemberg
- Mother: Archduchess Rosa of Austria-Tuscany
- Religion: Roman Catholic

Carl Herzog von Württemberg (Carl Maria Peter Ferdinand Philipp Albrecht Joseph Michael Pius Konrad Robert Ulrich; 1 August 1936 – 7 June 2022) was the head of the House of Württemberg from 1975 to 2022. He was succeeded by his grandson Wilhelm.

== Life ==
Carl was born in Friedrichshafen on 1 August 1936. He was the second son of Philipp Albrecht, Duke of Württemberg, and Archduchess Rosa of Austria, Princess of Tuscany. He was educated at the classical grammar school in Riedlingen and the University of Tübingen, where he studied law. After graduating, he joined the family estate business, based at Altshausen Palace.

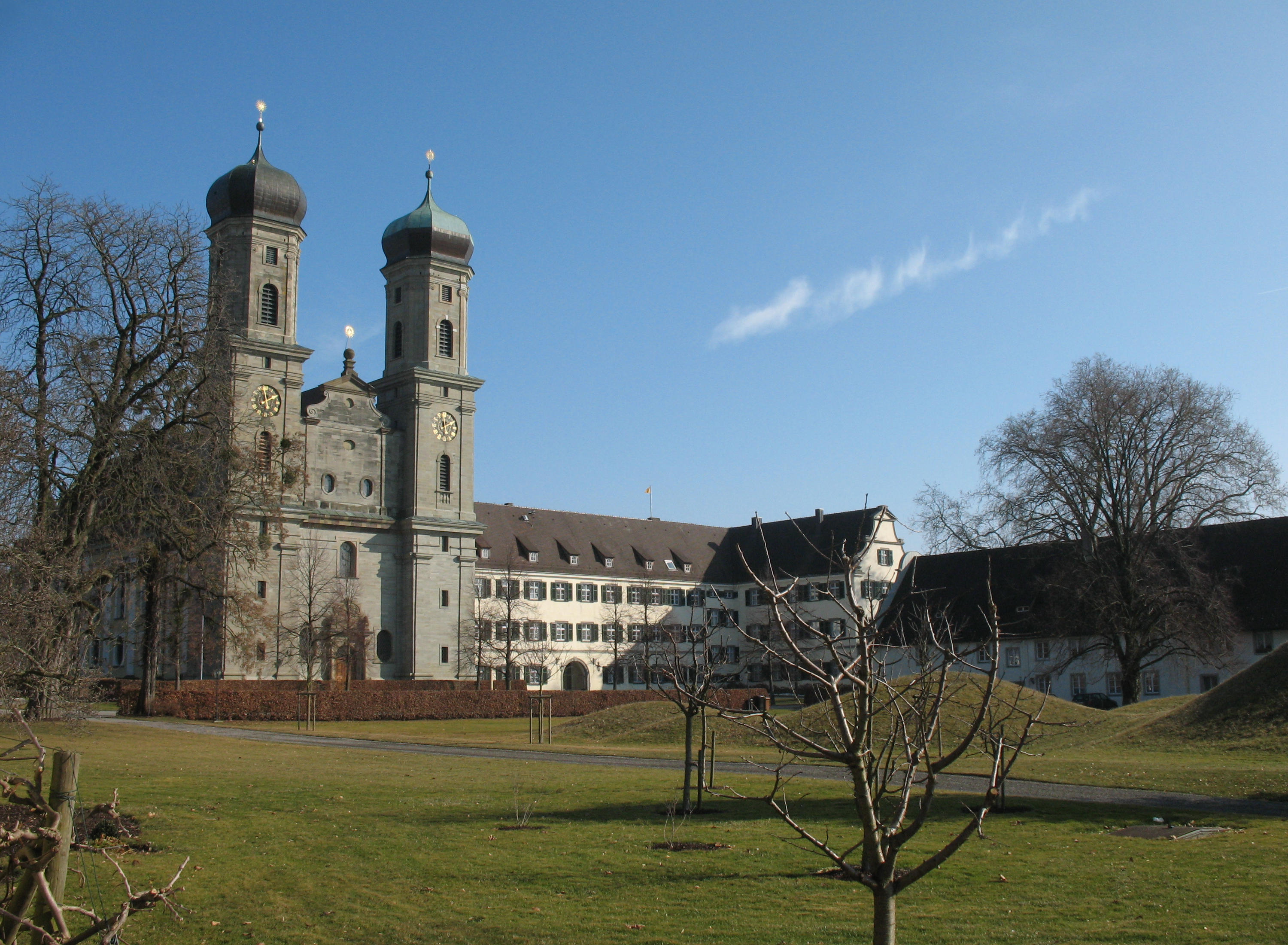
Friedrichshafen Castle

Carl became heir-presumptive to the headship of the House of Württemberg on 29 June 1959, when his older brother, Ludwig, renounced his succession rights. He became head of the family when his father died 15 April 1975. The family company manages around 5500 hectares of forest, around 2000 hectares of meadows and fields, fifty hectares of vineyards, other land in Germany and abroad, forests in Canada and Austria, and company holdings. It also maintains some seventy cultural monuments of the House of Württemberg. The current headquarters of the estate is Friedrichshafen Castle.

On 7 June 2022, Carl died in a hospital in Ravensburg at the age of 85. He was succeeded by his grandson Wilhelm since Carl's eldest son Friedrich had predeceased him.

== Charitable activities ==
Carl took part in many social and charitable activities, including the German Red Cross, the Friends of Cancer Children, the Free School Foundation, the Art Foundation, the Preventive Youth Welfare Foundation, and the Baden-Württemberg Monument Foundation, which he chaired from 2002 to 2008. He was Patron of the Society for the Promotion of the State Museum of Württemberg, and chairman of the Friends of the University of Tübingen and the University Foundation. In Altshausen, where he lived, he was Patron of the Citizens Guard Yellow Hussars.

On 30 July 2002 Carl and his wife Diane met with President of Lebanon Emile Lahoud and his wife at the Baabda Palace in Beirut to discuss a project to assist deprived Lebanese children as well as other social and cultural activities.

== Marriage and issue ==
On 21 July 1960, Carl married Princess Diane d'Orléans, the daughter of Prince Henri, Count of Paris, and his wife Princess Isabelle of Orléans-Braganza. The wedding took place at Schloss Altshausen, the ancestral seat of the Dukes of Württemberg.

They had four sons and two daughters and sixteen grandchildren:

- Duke Friedrich Philipp Carl Franz Maria (born Friedrichshafen, 1 June 1961 – near Ebenweiler, 9 May 2018), married in Altshausen civilly on 11 and religiously on 13 November 1993 to his distant cousin Princess Wilhelmine Friederike Pauline Elisabeth Marie of Wied (born Munich, 27 December 1973), great-granddaughter of Friedrich, Prince of Wied, and wife Princess Pauline of Württemberg, the only child of the last King of Württemberg to reach adulthood, and had one son and two daughters:
  - Duke Wilhelm Friedrich Carl Philipp Albert Nikolaus Erich Maria (born Ravensburg, 13 August 1994). His father having died in a car accident four years earlier, he succeeded his grandfather Carl as Head of the House of Württemberg in 2022
  - Duchess Marie-Amélie Diane Katharina Beatrix Philippa Sophie (born Ravensburg, 12 March 1996), married in 2023 Baron Franz-Ferdinand von Feilitzsch (born Tegernsee, 21 November 1997)
  - Duchess Sophie Dorothée Martina Johanna Henriette Charitas Maria (born Ravensburg, 19 August 1997)
- Duchess Mathilde Marie-Antoinette Rosa Isabelle (born Friedrichshafen, 11 July 1962), married in 1988 to Prince Erich of Waldburg zu Zeil und Trauchburg (born 21 November 1962), has issue.
- Duke Eberhard Alois Nikolaus Heinrich Johannes Maria (born Friedrichshafen, 20 June 1963), married firstly in 2011 (divorced in 2016) Lucia Desiree Copf (born Samedan, 29 December 1969), married secondly in 2023 Gaby Maier (b. 1970); he has one son with his first wife:
  - Duke Alexander Ferdinand Peter Mathias Maria (born Mannheim, 19 January 2010)
- Duke Philipp Albrecht Christoph Ulrich Maria (born Friedrichshafen, 1 November 1964), married in 1991 to Duchess Marie-Caroline in Bavaria, daughter of Max Emanuel, Duke in Bavaria. Duke Philipp is an art historian and former Chairman of Sotheby's Europe. Duchess Marie-Caroline has been Chair of the Board of Trustees of the Baden-Württemberg Foundation for Preventive Youth Welfare since 2011. They had three daughters and one son:
  - Duchess Sophie Anastasia Assunta Marie Pauline (born Munich, 15 January 1994), married in Altshausen, civilly on 15 September and religiously on 20 October 2018 Maximilien d'Andigné (born 19 March 1989)
  - Duchess Pauline Philippa Adelheid Helena Marie (born London, 15 April 1997)
  - Duke Carl Theodor Philipp Maria Max Emanuel (born London, 15 June 1999)
  - Duchess Anna Maximiliana Elizabeth Mariella Marie (born Frankfurt, 2 February 2007)
- Duke Michael Heinrich Albert Alexander Maria (born Friedrichshafen, 1 December 1965), married civilly in Schloss Altshausen on 7 and religiously at Friedrichshafen on 8 July 2006 Julia Ricarda Storz (born Munich, 4 April 1965), without issue.
- Duchess Eleonore Fleur Juanita Charlotte Eudoxie Marie-Agnès (born Altshausen, 4 November 1977), married in 2003 to Count Moritz Louis von Goëss (born Klagenfurt, 5 June 1966, whose family is descended from the Flemish-Portuguese humanist Damião de Góis), has issue.

== Honours and awards ==
=== House of Württemberg ===
- (Kingdom of Württemberg) Sovereign Knight Grand Cross of the Order of the Crown
- (Kingdom of Württemberg) Sovereign of the Order of Olga
- (Kingdom of Württemberg) Sovereign Knight Grand Cross of the Order of Military Merit
- (Kingdom of Württemberg) Sovereign Knight Grand Cross of the Order of Frederick I, Special Class

=== States ===
- Austria
  - Town of Hinterstoder: Honorary Citizen (2006)
- Germany: Great Cross of Merit of the Order of Merit of the Federal Republic of Germany
  - Baden-Württemberg: Great Staufer Medal in Gold (Große Staufermedaille in Gold) (2017)
    - Town of Althaus, Baden-Württemberg: Honorary Citizen (2006)
- Holy See: Knight Commander, Order of St. Gregory the Great (31 May 2002).
- : Lebanon: Knight, National Order of the Cedar (30 July 2002)
- Sovereign Military Order of Malta: Bailiff Knight Grand Cross of Honour and Devotion

=== Formerly reigning families ===
- (Duchy of Anhalt) Ducal Family of Anhalt: Knight Grand Cross with Collar of the Order of Albert the Bear
- (Austria-Hungary) Imperial and Royal Family of Austria: Knight of the Order of the Golden Fleece
- (Kingdom of Bavaria) Royal Family of Bavaria: Knight Grand Cross of the Order of Saint Hubert
- (Kingdom of Italy) Royal Family of Italy: Knight Grand Collar of the Supreme Order of the Most Holy Annunciation
- (Kingdom of the Two Sicilies) Royal Family of the Two Sicilies: Bailiff Knight Grand Cross of Justice of the Sacred Military Constantinian Order of Saint George

=== Religious orders ===
- Knight of Honour of the Teutonic Order (2009)

=== Academic institutions ===
- Honorary Senator, University of Tübingen
- Honorary Senator, University of Hohenheim
- Honorary Doctor of Theology, Philosophisch-Theologische Hochschule Vallendar (8 November 2008)

== Ancestry ==
Ancestors of Carl, Duke of Württemberg

8. Duke Philipp of Württemberg
4. Albrecht, Duke of Württemberg
9. Archduchess Maria Theresa of Austria
2. Philipp Albrecht, Duke of Württemberg
10. Archduke Karl Ludwig of Austria
5. Archduchess Margarete Sophie of Austria
11. Princess Maria Annunziata of Bourbon-Two Sicilies
1. Carl, Duke of Württemberg
12. Ferdinand IV, Grand Duke of Tuscany
6. Archduke Peter Ferdinand of Austria
13. Princess Alice of Bourbon-Parma
3. Archduchess Rosa of Austria
14. Prince Alfonso, Count of Caserta
7. Princess Maria Cristina of Bourbon-Two Sicilies
15. Princess Maria Antonietta of Bourbon-Two Sicilies
