= Philipp Albrecht, Duke of Württemberg =

Philipp Albrecht
- Duke of Württemberg
- Philipp Albrecht in 1910

Head of the House of Württemberg
- Period: 31 October 1939 – 15 April 1975
- Predecessor: Crown Prince Albert
- Successor: Duke Carl
- Born: 14 November 1893; Stuttgart, Kingdom of Württemberg, German Empire
- Died: 1 April 1975 (aged 81); Ravensburg, Baden-Württemberg, West Germany
- Spouse: Archduchess Helena of Austria (m. 1923; died 1924) Archduchess Rosa of Austria (m. 1928)
- Issue: Maria Christina, Princess Georg Hartman of Liechtenstein; Helene, Marchioness Pallavicini Duke Ludwig Albrecht; Elisabeth, Princess Antoine of Bourbon-Two Sicilies; Marie Thérèse, Duchess of Montpensier; Carl, Duke of Württemberg; Duchess Maria Antonia
Names
- Georg Philipp Albrecht Carl Maria Joseph Ludwig Hubertus Stanislaus Leopold
- House: Württemberg
- Father: Albrecht, Duke of Württemberg
- Mother: Archduchess Margarete Sophie of Austria
- Religion: Roman Catholicism

Philipp Albrecht, Duke of Württemberg (born Georg Philipp Albrecht Carl Maria Joseph Ludwig Hubertus Stanislaus Leopold Herzog von Württemberg; 14 November 1893 – 15 April 1975) was a German nobleman and head of the House of Württemberg. He was the son of Albrecht, Duke of Württemberg, and Archduchess Margarete Sophie of Austria. He was born in Stuttgart, and became head of the formerly reigning royal House of Württemberg on the death of his father on 29 October 1939. He died in Ravensburg, aged 81.

== Military service ==
Like many members of ruling houses, Duke Philipp Albrecht nominally entered the army while still a child. On 14 November 1903, the ten-year old Philipp Albrecht was named a Leutnant in Grenadier-Regiment „Königin Olga“ (1. Württembergisches) Nr. 119 of the Württemberg contingent of the Prussian Army.

On 18 August 1912, Philipp Albrecht entered active service in the regiment. He was promoted to Oberleutnant on 25 February 1913. On 16 June 1913, he was placed à la suite of the Royal Prussian Kürassier-Regiment „Herzog Friedrich Eugen von Württemberg“ (Westpreußisches) Nr. 5. He was transferred to Dragoner-Regiment König (2. Württembergisches) Nr. 26 on 1 November 1913.

Philipp Albrecht entered World War I with his regiment and was promoted to Rittmeister on 24 December 1914 In 1916, he was on his father's staff with the 4th Army. On 21 May 1916, he was placed à la suite of the Royal Saxon 6. Infanterie-Regiment König Wilhelm II. von Württemberg Nr. 105. As commander of a Landwehr infantry regiment, he was promoted to Major on 26 August 1917. Besides his honorary positions in the Prussian and Saxon armies, he was also given the Charakter of k.u.k. Major in Husarenregiment Nr. 6 of the Austro-Hungarian Army. After the end of the war and the dissolution of the Imperial German Army, he retired as a Major.

== Marriages and children ==
His first marriage was to Archduchess Helena of Austria, Princess of Tuscany (born 30 October 1903 in Linz; died 8 September 1924 in Tübingen), daughter of Archduke Peter Ferdinand of Austria (younger son of Ferdinand IV, Grand Duke of Tuscany) and his wife, Princess Maria Cristina of Bourbon-Two Sicilies (daughter of Prince Alfonso, Count of Caserta), on 24 October 1923 in Altshausen. They had one daughter:

- Duchess Maria Christina of Württemberg (born 2 September 1924), she married Prince Georg Hartman of Liechtenstein (son of Prince Aloys of Liechtenstein) on 23 September 1948. They have seven children and thirteen grandchildren.

Archduchess Helena died a week after giving birth to her daughter, Duchess Maria Christina.

His second marriage was to Archduchess Rosa of Austria, Princess of Tuscany (born 22 September 1906 in Parsch; died 17 September 1983 in Friedrichshafen), the sister of his late wife, on 1 August 1928 in Friedrichshafen. They had two sons and four daughters:

- Duchess Helene of Württemberg (29 June 1929 – 22 April 2021), she married Federico Pallavicini, Marchese Pallavicini, on 23 August 1961. They have four children:
  - Maria Cristina Pallavicini (born 4 January 1963), she married Jens Bartram on 23 September 1995.
  - Antonietta Pallavicini (born 9 January 1964).
  - Gabriella Pallavicini (born 23 April 1965), she married Ricardo Walter.
  - Giancarlo Pallavicini, Marchese Pallavicini (born 8 April 1967).
- Duke Ludwig Albrecht of Württemberg (23 October 1930 – 6 October 2019), who renounced his rights to the House of Württemberg on 29 June 1959, married Baroness Adelheid von und zu Bodman on 16 February 1960 and they were divorced on 12 December 1970. They have three children. He remarried Angelika Kiessig on 14 August 1972 and they were divorced on 14 October 1988. They have one daughter.
  - Duke Christoph von Württemberg (born 30 November 1960), he married Iris Caren Metzger (19 November 1963 – 29 April 2022) on 29 December 2000. They had one daughter and one son.
  - Duchess Isabelle von Württemberg (born 30 November 1960), twin of Duke Christoph.
  - Duchess Sibylla von Württemberg (born 29 May 1963), she has one son with Wolfgang Merz.
  - Duchess Christiane von Württemberg (born 16 September 1973), she married Till Kitzing (born 26 August 1972) in 2003.
- Duchess Elisabeth of Württemberg (2 February 1933 – 29 January 2022), she married Prince Antoine of Bourbon-Two Sicilies (20 January 1929 – 11 November 2019) on 18 July 1958. They have four children and two grandchildren.
- Duchess Marie-Thérèse of Württemberg (born 12 November 1934), she married Prince Henri d'Orléans, Count of Paris on 5 July 1957 and they were divorced on 3 February 1984. They have five children and twelve grandchildren.
- Carl, Duke of Württemberg (1 August 1936 – 7 June 2022), he married Princess Diane d'Orléans on 18 July 1960. They have six children and fourteen grandchildren.
- Duchess Maria Antonia of Württemberg (31 August 1937 – 12 November 2004).

Together with his children Ludwig and Elisabeth, he took part in the ship tour organized by Queen Frederica and her husband King Paul of Greece in 1954, which became known as the “Cruise of the Kings” and was attended by over 100 royals from all over Europe.

== Ancestry ==
Ancestors of Philipp Albrecht, Duke of Württemberg

8. Duke Alexander of Württemberg
4. Duke Philipp of Württemberg
9. Princess Marie of Orléans
2. Albrecht, Duke of Württemberg
10. Archduke Albrecht, Duke of Teschen
5. Archduchess Maria Theresa of Austria
11. Princess Hildegard of Bavaria
1. Philipp Albrecht, Duke of Württemberg
12. Archduke Franz Karl of Austria
6. Archduke Karl Ludwig of Austria
13. Princess Sophie of Bavaria
3. Archduchess Margarete Sophie of Austria
14. Ferdinand II of the Two Sicilies
7. Princess Maria Annunziata of Bourbon-Two Sicilies
15. Archduchess Maria Theresa of Austria

== Decorations and awards ==
- Kingdom of Württemberg:
  - Order of the Württemberg Crown
    - Grand Cross
    - Knight's Cross with Swords (20 February 1918)
  - Friedrich Order, Grand Cross
  - Golden Military Merit Medal (1 November 1914)
  - Military Merit Order, Knight's Cross, in lieu of the previously awarded Golden Military Merit Medal (21 May 1915)
  - Wilhelm Cross with Swords and Crown (5 October 1916)
  - 1911 Royal Wedding Medal
- Kingdom of Bavaria:
  - Order of St. Hubert, Knight (1913)
  - Military Merit Order, 4th Class with Swords
- Free and Hanseatic City of Hamburg: Hanseatic Cross
- Grand Duchy of Hesse: General Honor Decoration for Bravery
- Free and Hanseatic City of Lübeck: Hanseatic Cross
- Kingdom of Prussia:
  - Iron Cross, 2nd Class
  - Iron Cross, 1st Class
- Kingdom of Saxony: Albert Order, Knight 1st Class with Swords
- Duchy of Saxe-Meiningen: Cross for Merit in War
- Austria-Hungary:
  - Order of the Golden Fleece
  - Order of Saint Stephen of Hungary, Grand Cross
  - Order of the Iron Crown, 3rd Class with War Decoration
  - Military Merit Cross, 3rd Class with War Decoration
- Kingdom of Bulgaria: Order of Military Merit, Officer's Cross with War Decoration
- Ottoman Empire:
  - Liakat Medal in Gold
  - War Medal

== References and notes ==
Philipp Albrecht, Duke of Württemberg House of Württemberg Born: 14 November 1893 Died: 15 April 1975
Titles in pretence
Preceded by Duke Albrecht	— TITULAR — King of Württemberg; 31 October 1939 – 17 April 1975; Reason for succession failure: Kingdom abolished in 1918	Succeeded by Duke Carl
