= Archduchess Rosa of Austria =

Austrian archduchess (1906–1983)

Archduchess Rosa
- Duchess of Württemberg
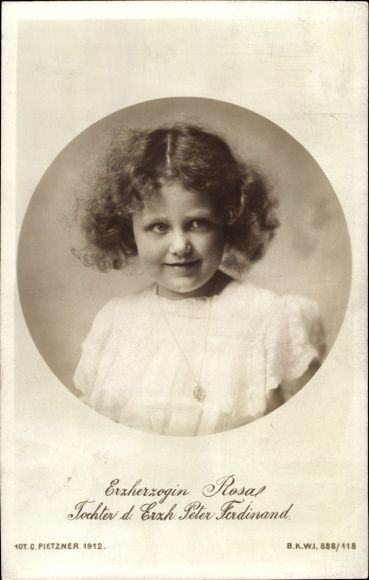
- Archduchess Rosa, circa 1912.
- Born: 22 September 1906; Parsch, Salzburg, Austria
- Died: 17 September 1983 (aged 76); Friedrichshafen, Baden-Württemberg, Germany
- Spouse: Philipp Albrecht, Duke of Württemberg (m. 1928; died 1975)
- Issue: Helene, Marchioness Pallavicini Duke Ludwig Albrecht; Elisabeth, Princess Antoine of Bourbon-Two Sicilies; Marie Thérèse, Duchess of Montpensier; Carl, Duke of Württemberg; Duchess Maria Antonia
- House: Habsburg-Lorraine
- Father: Archduke Peter Ferdinand of Austria
- Mother: Princess Maria Cristina of Bourbon-Two Sicilies

Archduhess Rosa Maria Antonie Roberta Josepha Anna Walburga Carmela Ignazia Rita de Cascia of Austria(German: Rosa Maria Antonie Roberta Josepha Anna Walburga Carmela Ignazia Rita de Cascia, Erzherzogin von Österreich; 22 September 1906 – 17 September 1983) was a member of the Tuscan branch of the House of Habsburg-Lorraine and an Archduchess of Austria and Princess of Bohemia, Hungary, and Tuscany by birth. Through her marriage to Philipp Albrecht, Duke of Württemberg, Rosa was also a member of the House of Württemberg and Duchess consort of Württemberg.

== Early life ==
Rosa was the fourth and youngest child of Archduke Peter Ferdinand, Prince of Tuscany, and his wife, Princess Maria Cristina of Bourbon-Two Sicilies. Rosa was raised with her three siblings in Salzburg and Vienna until the end of World War I in 1918, when her family was exiled and moved to Lucerne, Switzerland.

== Marriage and issue ==
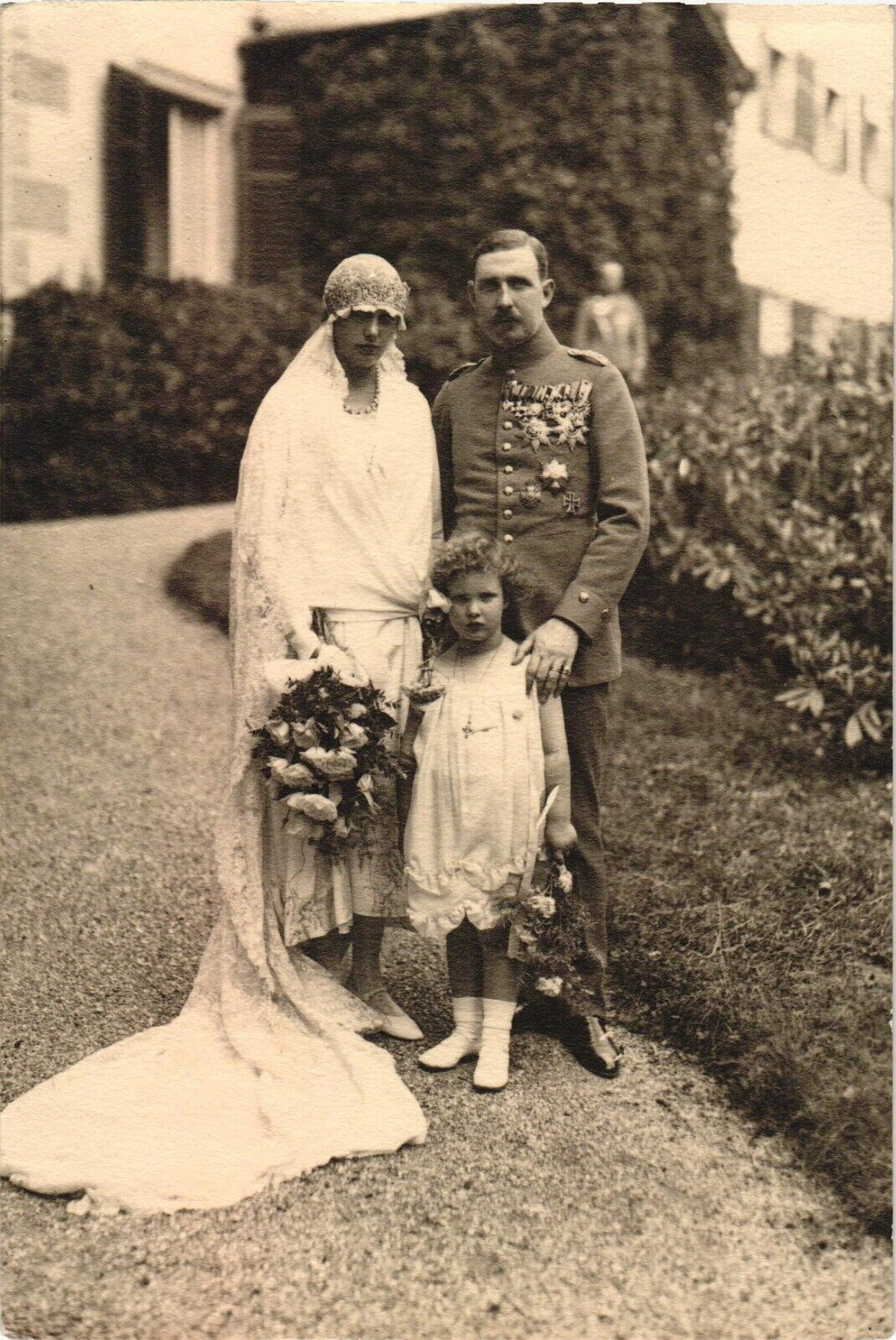
Rosa with her husband and her stepdaughter

Rosa married Philipp Albrecht, Duke of Württemberg, eldest child and son of Albrecht, Duke of Württemberg, and his wife, Archduchess Margarete Sophie of Austria, on 1 August 1928 in Friedrichshafen. Rosa and Philipp Albrecht had two sons and four daughters:

- Duchess Helene of Württemberg (29 June 1929 – 22 April 2021), married in 1961 to Marquess Federico Pallavicini, with issue.
- Duke Ludwig Albrecht of Württemberg (23 October 1930 – 6 October 2019), married twice morganatically, with issue.
- Duchess Elisabeth of Württemberg (2 February 1933 – 27 January 2022), married in 1958 to Prince Antoine of Bourbon-Two Sicilies.
- Duchess Marie-Thérèse of Württemberg (born 12 November 1934), married in 1957 to Prince Henri d'Orléans, Orléanist pretender to the throne of France.
- Carl, Duke of Württemberg (1 August 1936 – 7 June 2022), head of the House of Württemberg from 1975 until his death in 2022; married Princess Diane of Orléans.
- Duchess Maria Antonia of Württemberg (31 August 1937 – 12 November 2004).

== Ancestry ==
Ancestors of Archduchess Rosa of Austria

8. Leopold II, Grand Duke of Tuscany
4. Ferdinand IV, Grand Duke of Tuscany
9. Princess Maria Antonia of the Two Sicilies
2. Archduke Peter Ferdinand of Austria
10. Charles III, Duke of Parma
5. Princess Alice of Bourbon-Parma
11. Princess Louise of Artois
1. Archduchess Rosa of Austria
12. Ferdinand II of the Two Sicilies
6. Prince Alfonso, Count of Caserta
13. Archduchess Maria Theresa of Austria
3. Princess Maria Cristina of Bourbon-Two Sicilies
14. Prince Francis, Count of Trapani
7. Princess Maria Antonietta of Bourbon-Two Sicilies
15. Archduchess Maria Isabella of Austria

Archduchess Rosa of Austria House of Habsburg-Lorraine Cadet branch of the House of Lorraine Born: 22 September 1906 Died: 17 September 1983
Titles in pretence
Vacant Title last held by Charlotte of Schaumburg-Lippe	— TITULAR — Queen consort of Württemberg; 31 October 1939 – 17 April 1975	Succeeded by Diane of Orléans
