= Archduke Peter Ferdinand of Austria =

Austro-Hungarian general (1874–1948)

Archduke Peter Ferdinand
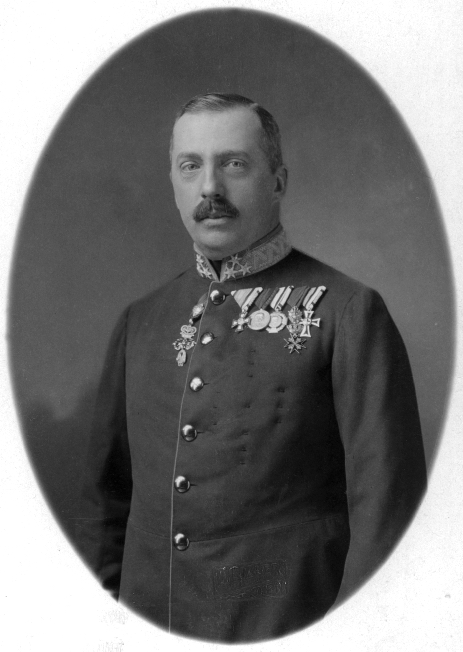
- Peter Ferdinand in 1914

Head of the House of Habsburg-Tuscany
- Reign: 2 May 1921 - 8 November 1948
- Predecessor: Archduke Joseph Ferdinand of Austria
- Successor: Archduke Gottfried of Austria
- Born: 12 May 1874; Salzburg, Duchy of Salzburg Austria-Hungary
- Died: 8 November 1948 (aged 74); St. Gilgen, Salzburg, Austria
- Spouse: Princess Maria Cristina of Bourbon-Two Sicilies (m. 1900; died 1947)
- Issue: Archduke Gottfried; Helena, Hereditary Duchess of Württemberg; Archduke Georg; Rosa, Duchess of Württemberg
Names
- German: Peter Ferdinand Salvator Karl Ludwig Maria Joseph Leopold Anton Rupert Pius Pancraz
- House: Habsburg-Lorraine
- Father: Ferdinand IV, Grand Duke of Tuscany
- Mother: Alice of Bourbon-Parma

Archduke Peter Ferdinand of Austria, Prince of Hungary and Bohemia (Peter Ferdinand Salvator Karl Ludwig Maria Joseph Leopold Anton Rupert Pius Pancraz; 12 May 1874, in Salzburg, Austria-Hungary – 8 November 1948, in St. Gilgen, Salzburg, Austria) was an Austro-Hungarian archduke and an army commander in the Austro-Hungarian Army during World War I.

== Family ==
Monarchical styles of Archduke Peter Ferdinand of Austria
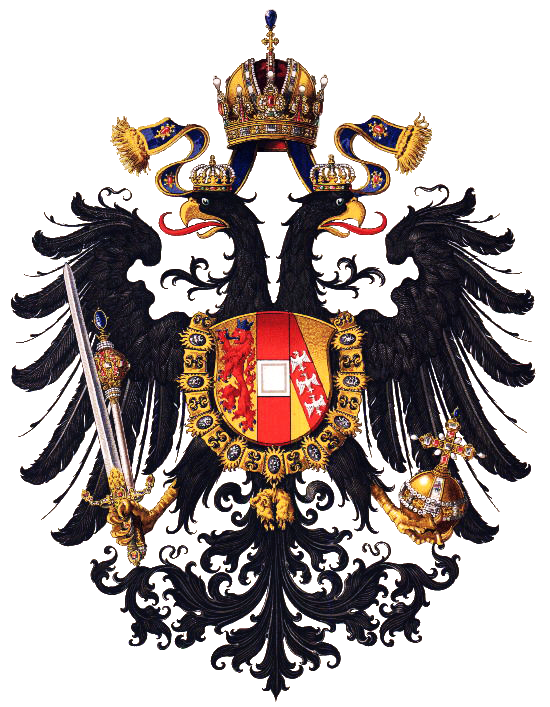
- Reference style: His Imperial and Royal Highness
- Spoken style: Your Imperial and Royal Highness

Peter Ferdinand was the fourth child and third-eldest son of Ferdinand IV, Grand Duke of Tuscany and his wife Alice of Bourbon-Parma. His two elder brothers married morganatically. While his father had kept the title of Grand Duke of Tuscany after the abolition of the dukedom in 1860, he had abdicated it in favor of the Austrian Emperor in 1870. Peter Ferdinand did not pretend to the title of grand duke himself. The former Prime Minister of Saxony and later Imperial and Household Minister Beust declared: ‘The Tuscan Grand Ducal family has lost its sovereign rights as a result of political events. This branch of the Austrian imperial family is therefore naturally subordinate to the rights and duties of all other members of the imperial family. The Grand Dukes Leopold and Ferdinand and their more famous brothers are therefore from now on to be considered only as Archdukes of Austria and to be treated in accordance with the Statute of the High Noble Family of 3 February 1839."

== Life ==
Peter Ferdinand had a career in the army. In 1908 he was a colonel, in 1911 major general and on 23 April 1914 he was promoted to Feldmarschall-Leutnant. At the outbreak of World War I in August 1914, he was commander of the 25th Infantry Division, with which he fought against Russia in Galicia and southern Poland, as part of the Austro-Hungarian II Corps. General Moritz von Auffenberg later blamed Peter Ferdinand's actions for preventing the encirclement of the entire 5th Russian army during the Battle of Komarów (1914). In June 1915, Peter Ferdinand was relieved of command and the 25th Division was taken over by Major General Joseph Poleschensky.

On 17 April 1917 he was reinstated and, as a General of the Infantry, put in command of an army corps on the Italian front. His troops first defended the Ortler Range and then covered the flank of the 14th German Army during its advance in the Battle of Caporetto. On August 15, 1918 his Corps, now stationed in Trentino, was renamed to V Army Corps. From 26 October 1918, in the last days of the war, he commanded the 10th Army in Trentino on behalf of Field Marshal Alexander von Krobatin.

== Marriage and issue ==
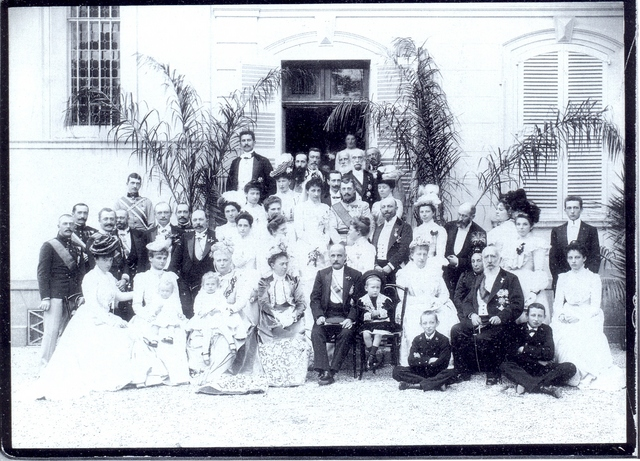
Marriage photo

Peter Ferdinand married Princess Maria Cristina of Bourbon-Two Sicilies, daughter of Prince Alfonso, Count of Caserta and his wife Princess Antonietta of Bourbon-Two Sicilies, on 8 November 1900 in Cannes, France. They had issue:

- Archduke Gottfried of Austria (14 March 1902 – 21 January 1984)

married Princess Dorothea of Bavaria on 3 August 1938 in Sárvár, Hungary; and had issue:

Archduchess Elisabeth (born 2 October 1939) married Friedrich Elder von Braun on 26 April 1965 and has issue.
Archduchess Alice (born 29 April 1941) married Baron Vittorio Manno on 7 May 1970 and has issue.
Archduke Leopold Franz (25 October 1942 - 23 June 2021 )
Archduchess Maria Antoinette (born 16 September 1950)

- Archduchess Helena (30 October 1903 – 8 September 1924)

married Philipp Albrecht, Duke of Württemberg on 24 October 1923 at Altshausen, Baden-Württemberg, Germany; and they had issue.

- Archduke Georg (22 August 1905 – 21 March 1952) married Countess Marie Valerie of Waldburg-Zeil-Hohenems on 29 August 1936 at St. Gilgen, and they had issue

- Archduke Guntram (19 August 1937 – 21 April 1944)
- Archduke Radbot (born 23 September 1938) married Caroline Proust
  - Archduke Leopold (17 June 1973) married Nina Lenhart-Backhaus on 8 June 2002
    - Archduchess Chiara (9 March 2004)
    - Archduke Felix (2007)
    - Archduke Georg (2009)
  - Archduke Maximilian (12 August 1976)
  - Archduchess Eleonore (6 October 1979) married Marquess Francesco Pelagallo in 2005 and has issue
- Archduchess Marie Christine (8 April 1941 – 4 January 1942)
- Archduchess Walburga (born 23 July 1942) married Carlos Tasso de Saxe-Coburg e Bragança (born 16 July 1931) son of Princess Teresa of Saxe-Coburg & Gotha on 19 February 1969 and has issue.
- Archduchess Verena (21 June 1944 – 5 January 1945)
- Archduke Johann (born and died 27 December 1946)
- Archduchess Katharina (born 24 April 1948) married Roland Huber on 22 May 1983 with no issue.
- Archduchess Agnes (born 20 April 1950) married Baron Peter von Furstenberg and has issue.
- Archduke Georg (born 28 August 1952)

- Archduchess Rosa 22 September 1906 – 17 September 1983)

married Philipp Albrecht, Duke of Württemberg on 1 August 1928 at Friedrichshafen; and they had issue.

== Ancestry ==
Ancestors of Archduke Peter Ferdinand of Austria

8. Ferdinand III, Grand Duke of Tuscany
4. Leopold II, Grand Duke of Tuscany
9. Princess Luisa of Naples and Sicily
2. Ferdinand IV, Grand Duke of Tuscany
10. Francis I of the Two Sicilies
5. Princess Maria Antonia of the Two Sicilies
11. Infanta Maria Isabella of Spain
1. Archduke Peter Ferdinand of Austria
12. Charles II, Duke of Parma
6. Charles III, Duke of Parma
13. Princess Maria Teresa of Savoy
3. Princess Alice of Bourbon-Parma
14. Prince Charles Ferdinand, Duke of Berry
7. Princess Louise of Artois
15. Princess Marie Caroline of Naples and Sicily
