= Descendants of Henry IV of France =

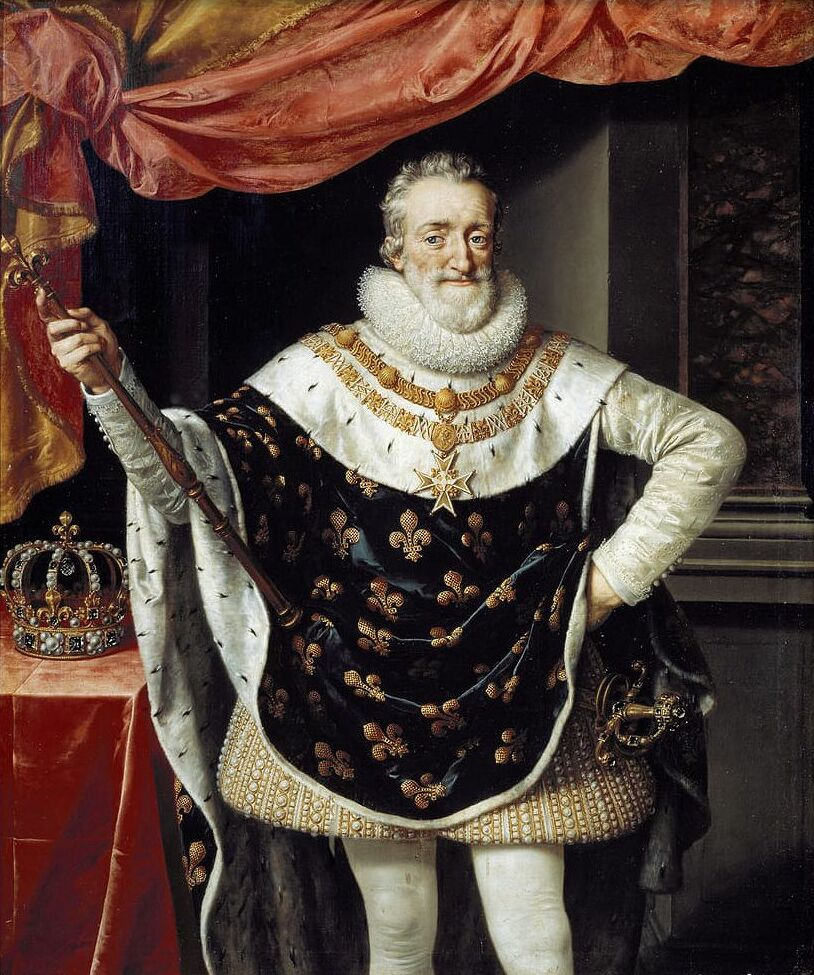
King Henry IV of France

Henry IV of France was the first Bourbon king of France. Formerly known as Henri of Navarre, he succeeded to the French throne with the extinction of House of Valois, at the death of Henry III of France.

His descendants are varied and numerous. Some of his descendants are Juan Carlos of Spain, Franz, Duke of Bavaria, Diana, Princess of Wales, actress Brooke Shields and singer and actress Jane Birkin. He had six children with his wife Marie de' Medici and also had at least eleven illegitimate children with his many mistresses. This article deals with each of his legitimate children and their respective descendants.

== Life, background and pedigree ==
=== Life and claim to the French Throne ===
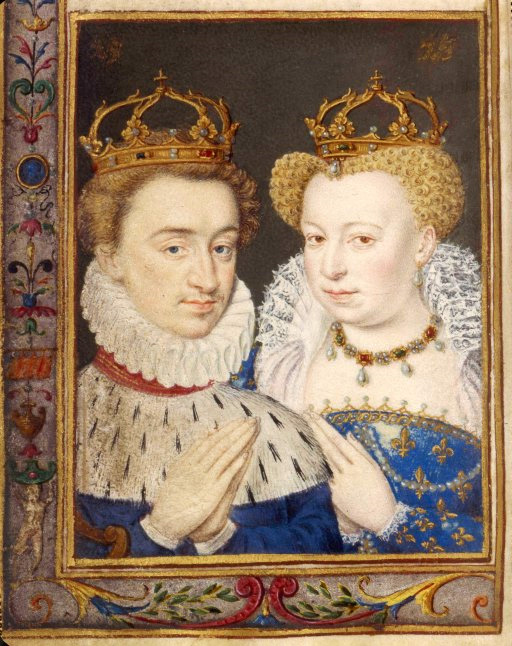
Extracted miniature from a book of prayers of Catherine de' Medici, representing Henry and Margaret as King and Queen of Navarre.

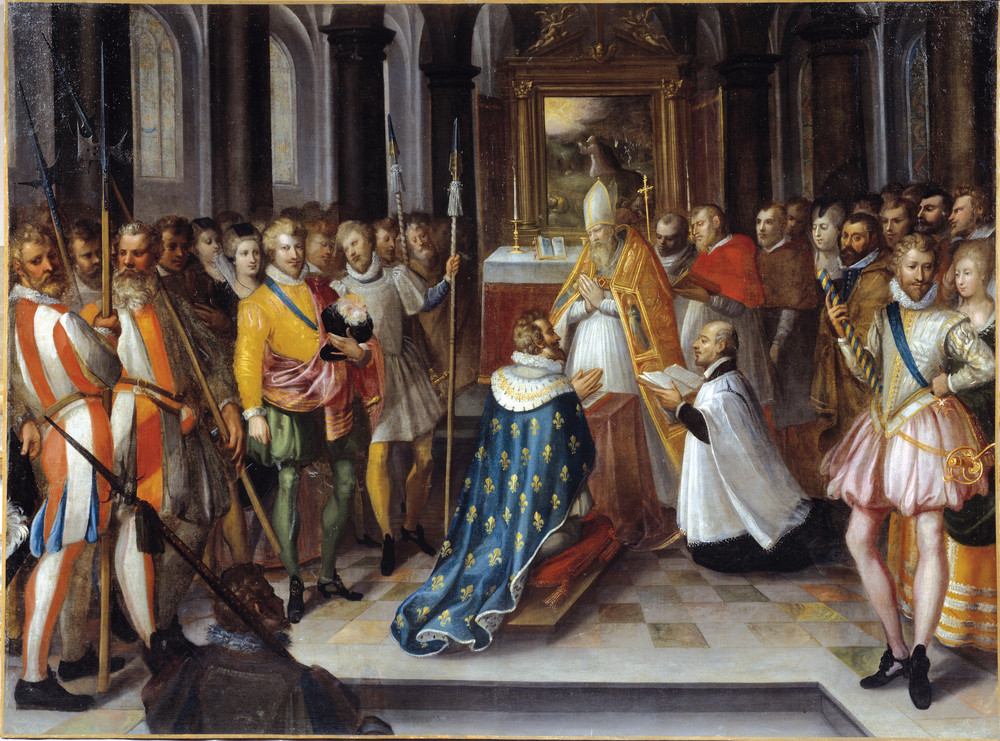
The coronation of Henry of Navarre as Henry IV of France.

Henri de Bourbon was born in Pau, the capital of the French province of Béarn. Although baptised as a Roman Catholic, Henry was raised as a Protestant by his mother Jeanne d’Albret. On 9 June 1572, upon Jeanne's death, he became King Henry III of Navarre.

When Henry was a boy, it seemed highly unlikely that he would ever inherit the throne of France, since Henry II had produced four surviving sons. However, his male-line pedigree gave him a special place of honour in the French nobility, since all sons of the Bourbon line were acknowledged as the princes of the blood. As the senior male representative of that line, Henry was officially the First Prince of the Blood.

Henry of Navarre became the legal heir to the French throne upon the death in 1584 of François, Duke of Alençon, brother and heir presumptive of the Catholic King Henry III. Because of Henry's status as the Prince du Sang, Henry III had no choice but to recognise him as the legitimate successor. The Salic law disinherited the king's sisters and all others who could claim descent by the distaff line. He was then the closest relative of the king in the legitimate male line, and as such the next senior-most representative of the House of Capet after the king himself. Catherine de Medici, the King's mother, had attempted to unite Valois and Bourbon interests. In 1572, by which time only two of her sons remained alive, she brokered a marriage between her daughter Marguerite of Valois and Henry.

On the death of Henry III on 2 August 1589, Henri of Navarre nominally became the King of France. But the powerful Catholic League, strengthened by support from Spain, forced him to the south and he had to set about winning his kingdom by military conquest, aided by money and troops bestowed by Protestant England. This set off the War of the Three Henries phase of the French Wars of Religion. The League proclaimed Henry's Catholic uncle Charles, the Cardinal de Bourbon, king as Charles X, but the Cardinal himself was Henry's prisoner. Henry was victorious at Ivry and Arques, but failed to take Paris.

With the encouragement of the great love of his life, Gabrielle d'Estrées, on 25 July 1593 Henry declared that Paris vaut bien une messe ("Paris is well worth a mass") and permanently renounced Protestantism, thus earning him the allegiance of the vast majority of his subjects and the resentment of his former allies. He was crowned King of France at the Cathedral of Chartres on 27 February 1594. In 1598, he declared the Edict of Nantes, which gave circumscribed toleration to the Huguenots. However, this action angered fanatical Catholics, who wanted Protestantism rooted out for good, and could see that Henry had no intention to do so. Therefore, in 1610, Henry was assassinated by a fanatical Catholic, François Ravaillac.

=== Pedigree ===
==== Maternal ancestry ====
Ancestors of Jeanne III of Navarre

Jean d'Albret, Vicomte de Tartas
Alain I of Albret
Catherine de Rohan
John III of Navarre
Guillaume de Châtillon de Blois, Vicomte de Limoges, Seigneur d'Avesnes
Françoise of Châtillon-Limoges
Isabelle de La Tour d'Auvergne
Henry II of Navarre
Gaston IV, Comte de Foix
Gaston of Foix, Prince of Viana
Eleanor of Navarre
Catherine I of Navarre
Charles VII of France
Magdalena of Valois
Marie d'Anjou, Queen of France
Jeanne III of Navarre
Louis, Duc d'Orléans
John, Count of Angoulême
Valentina Visconti
Charles, Count of Angoulême
Alain IX de Rohan, Vicomte de Rohan et de Leon
Marguerite de Rohan
Marguerite of Brittany, Dame de Guillac
Marguerite of Angoulême
Louis, Duke of Savoy
Philip II, Duke of Savoy
Anne de Lusignan
Louise of Savoy
Charles I, Duke of Bourbon
Margaret of Bourbon
Agnes of Burgundy

==== Paternal ancestry ====
Ancestors of Antoine of Navarre

16. Louis, Count of Vendôme
8. John VIII, Count of Vendôme
17. Jeanne de Laval
4. François, Count of Vendôme
18. Louis de Beauvau, Seneschal of Anjou
9. Isabelle de Beauvau
19. Marguerite de Chambley
2. Charles de Bourbon, Duke of Vendôme
20. Louis, Count of Saint-Pol
10. Peter II, Count of Saint-Pol
21. Jeanne de Bar
5. Marie de Luxembourg
22. Louis, Duke of Savoy
11. Margaret of Savoy
23. Anne of Cyprus
1. Antoine of Navarre
24. John I of Alençon
12. John II of Alençon
25. Marie of Brittany
6. René of Alençon
26. Jean IV d'Armagnac
13. Marie of Armagnac
27. Isabella de Navarre
3. Françoise of Alençon
28. Antoine of Vaudémont
14. Frederick II of Vaudémont
29. Marie d'Harcourt
7. Margaret of Lorraine
30. René of Anjou
15. Yolande, Duchess of Lorraine
31. Isabella, Duchess of Lorraine

Henry IV's descent in the male line from Louis IX of France, and his relationship with the last Valois kings

King Louis IX (Saint Louis) (1214/1215 – 1270)
Robert, Count of Clermont (1256–1317), brother of King Philip III
Louis I, Duke of Bourbon (1279–1342), 1st cousin of King Philip IV
James I, Count of La Marche (1315–1362), 2nd cousin of kings Louis X, Philip V, Charles IV, and Philip VI
John I, Count of La Marche (1344–1393), 3rd cousin of kings John I Posthumus and John II
Louis, Count of Vendôme (1376–1446), 4th cousin of King Charles V
François, Count of Vendôme (1470–1495), 6th cousin of King Charles VII
Charles IV, Duke of Bourbon (1489–1537), 7th cousin of kings Louis XI and Louis XII
Antoine de Bourbon (1518–1562), 8th cousin of kings Charles VIII and Francis I
Henry IV was the 9th cousin of King Henry II,
and the 9th cousin once removed of kings Francis II, Charles IX, and Henry III

== Legitimate issue by Marie de' Medici ==
=== Children ===
Name	Portrait	Birth	Death	Marriages and issue
Louis XIII, King of France		27 September 1601	14 May 1643	Married Anne of Austria in 1615; Had issue
Elizabeth, Queen of Spain		22 November 1602	6 October 1644	Married Philip IV, King of Spain in 1615; Had issue
Christine Marie, Duchess of Savoy		10 February 1606	27 December 1663	Married Victor Amadeus I, Duke of Savoy in 1619; Had issue
Henrietta Maria, Queen of England		25 November 1609	10 September 1669	Married Charles I, King of England in 1625; Had issue
Gaston d'Orléans		25 April 1608	2 February 1660	Married (1) Marie de Bourbon, Duchess of Montpensier in 1626; Married (2) Margaret of Lorraine in 1632; Had issue

==== Descendants of Louis XIII of France ====
===== Senior agnatic descendants Louis XIV of France =====
Name of descendant	Portrait	Birth	Marriages and issue	Death	Miscellaneous
Bourbons of France
Louis XIV; 1643—1715		5 September 1638, son of Louis XIII and Anne of Austria	Maria Theresa of Spain; 6 children Françoise d'Aubigné, Marquise de Maintenon no children	1 September 1715 (aged 76)	
Louis, Dauphin of France		1 November 1661, son of Maria Theresa of Spain and Louis XIV	Duchess Maria Anna Victoria of Bavaria; 3 children	14 April 1711 (aged 49)	
Louis, Duke of Burgundy		16 August 1682, son of Louis, Dauphin of France and Maria Anna of Bavaria	Marie Adélaïde of Savoy; 3 children	18 February 1712 (aged 30)	
Louis XV; 1715—1774		15 February 1710, son of Louis, Duke of Burgundy and Marie-Adélaïde of Savoy	Marie Leszczyńska; 10 children	10 May 1774 (aged 64)	
Louis, Dauphin of France		4 September 1729, son of Louis XV and Marie Leszczyńska	Maria Teresa Rafaela of Spain; 1 child Maria Josepha of Saxony; 8 children	20 December 1765 (aged 36)	
Louis XVI; 1774—1793		23 August 1754, son of Louis, Dauphin of France and Marie-Josèphe of Saxony	Marie Antoinette; 4 children	21 January 1793 (aged 38)	
Louis XVII; 1793–1795		27 March 1785; Palace of Versailles son of Louis XVI and Marie Antoinette	never married	8 June 1795; Paris Temple (aged 10)	
Louis XVIII; 1795–1824		17 November 1755; Palace of Versailles son of Louis, Dauphin of France and Marie-Josèphe of Saxony	Marie Josephine Louise of Savoy; 14 May 1771; No children	16 September 1824; Paris (aged 68)	
Charles X of France; 1824–1836		9 October 1757, son of Louis, Dauphin of France and Marie-Josèphe of Saxony	Marie Thérèse of Savoy; 3 children	6 November 1836 (aged 79)	
Artois branch
Louis Antoine, Duke of Angoulême; 1836–1844		6 August 1775; Palace of Versailles son of Charles X of France and Marie Thérèse of Savoy	Marie-Thérèse-Charlotte of France; June 1799; No children	3 June 1844; Gorizia (aged 68)	
Charles Ferdinand, Duke of Berry		24 January 1778; Palace of Versailles son of Charles X of France and Marie Thérèse of Savoy	Princess Caroline of Naples; 1816; 4 children	14 February 1820; Paris (aged 42)	
Henri, Count of Chambord; 1844–1883		29 September 1820; Tuileries Palace son of Charles Ferdinand, Duke of Berry and Caroline Ferdinande Louise of Two Sicilies	Marie Thérèse of Austria-Este; November 1846; No children	24 August 1883; Gorizia (aged 63)	
Bourbons of Spain
Philip V of Spain		19 December 1683, son of Louis, le Grand Dauphin and Maria Anna Victoria of Bavaria	Maria Luisa of Savoy; Elisabeth Farnese; 9 children	9 July 1746 (aged 62)	
Charles III of Spain		20 January 1716, son of Philip V and Elizabeth of Parma	Maria Amalia of Saxony; 13 children	14 December 1788 (aged 72)	
Charles IV of Spain		11 November 1748, son of Charles III of Spain and Maria Amalia of Saxony	Maria Luisa of Parma; 12 children	20 January 1819 (aged 70)	
Ferdinand VII of Spain		14 October 1784, son of Charles IV of Spain and Maria Luisa of Parma	Maria Antonia of Naples, Maria Isabel of Portugal, Maria Josepha Amalia of Saxony and Maria Christina of the Two Sicilies; 2 children	29 September 1833 (aged 48)	
Molina branch
Infante Carlos, Count of Molina		29 March 1788; Madrid son of Charles IV of Spain and Maria Luisa of Parma	Maria Francisca of Portugal; 1816; Teresa, Princess of Beira; 1838; 2 children	10 March 1855 aged 66	
Juan, Count of Montizón; 1883–1887		15 May 1822; Royal Palace of Aranjuez son of Infante Carlos of Spain and Infanta Maria Francisca of Portugal	Maria Beatrix of Austria-Este; 6 February 1847; 2 children	21 November 1887; Hove aged 65	
Carlos, Duke of Madrid; 1887–1909		30 March 1848; Ljubljana son of Juan, Count of Montizón and Maria Beatrix of Austria-Este	Margherita of Parma; 4 February 1867; 5 children	18 July 1909; Varese aged 61	
Jaime, Duke of Madrid; 1909–1931		27 June 1870; Vevey son of Carlos, Duke of Madrid and Margherita of Parma	never married	2 October 1931; París aged 61	
Alfonso Carlos, Duke of San Jaime; 1931–1936		12 September 1849; London son of Juan, Count of Montizón and Maria Beatrix of Austria-Este	Maria das Neves of Portugal; 26 April 1871; 1 child	29 September 1936; Vienna aged 87	
Cádiz branch
Infante Francisco de Paula of Spain		10 March 1794; Aranjuez son of Charles IV of Spain and Maria Luisa of Parma	Princess Luisa Carlotta of Naples and Sicily; 12 June 1819; 11 children	13 August 1865; Madrid aged 71	
Francis, Duke of Cádiz		13 May 1822; Aranjuez son of Infante Francisco de Paula of Spain and Princess Luisa Carlotta of Naples and Sicily	Isabella II of Spain; 10 October 1846; 12 children	17 April 1902; Épinay-sur-Seine, France aged 79	
Alfonso XII of Spain		28 November 1857; Madrid son of Isabella II of Spain and Francis, Duke of Cádiz	Mercedes of Orléans; 23 January 1878; No children Maria Christina of Austria; 29 November 1879; 3 children	25 November 1885; El Pardo aged 27	
Alfonso XIII of Spain; 1936–1941		17 May 1886; Madrid son of Alfonso XII and Maria Christina of Austria	Victoria Eugenie of Battenberg; 31 May 1906; 7 children	28 February 1941; Rome aged 54	
Infante Jaime, Duke of Segovia; 1941–1975		23 June 1908; Segovia son of Alfonso XIII and Victoria Eugenie of Battenberg	Emmanuelle de Dampierre; 4 March 1935; Rome; 2 children	20 March 1975; St. Gallen aged 67	
Alfonso, Duke of Anjou and Cádiz; 1975–1989		20 April 1936; Rome son of Infante Jaime, Duke of Segovia and Emmanuelle de Dampierre	María del Carmen Martínez-Bordiú y Franco; 8 March 1972; Royal Palace of El Pardo; 2 children	30 January 1989; Beaver Creek aged 53	
Louis Alphonse, Duke of Anjou; 1989–present		25 April 1974; Madrid son of Alfonso, Duke of Anjou and Cádiz and María del Carmen Martínez-Bordiú y Franco	Maria Margarita, Duchess of Anjou; 5 November 2004; Caracas; 3 children		

===== Senior agnatic descendants of Philippe I, Duke of Orleans =====
Name of descendant	Portrait	Birth	Marriages and issue	Death	Miscellaneous
Philippe I, Duke of Orléans; 1640–1701		21 September 1640, son of Louis XIII and Anne of Austria	Henrietta Anne of England; 4 children Elizabeth Charlotte of the Palatinate; 3 children	9 June 1701 (aged 60)	
Philippe II, Duke of Orléans; 1701–1723		2 August 1674, son of Philippe I, Duke of Orléans and Elizabeth Charlotte of the Palatinate	Françoise Marie de Bourbon; 8 children	2 December 1723 (aged 49)	
Louis d'Orléans, Duke of Orléans; 1723–1752		4 August 1703; Palace of Versailles son of Françoise-Marie de Bourbon and Philippe II, Duke of Orléans	Margravine Auguste Marie Johanna of Baden-Baden; 18 June 1724; 2 children	4 February 1752; Paris aged 48	
Louis Philippe I, Duke of Orléans; 1752–1785		12 May 1725; Palace of Versailles son of Louis d'Orléans, Duke of Orléans and Margravine Auguste Marie Johanna of Baden-Baden	Louise Henriette de Bourbon; 1743; 3 children	18 November 1785; Seine-Port aged 60	
Louis Philippe II, Duke of Orléans; 1785–1793		13 April 1747; Château de Saint Cloud son of Louis Philippe I, Duke of Orléans and Louise Henriette de Bourbon	Louise Marie Adélaïde de Bourbon; 6 June 1769; 5 children	6 November 1793; Paris aged 46	
Louis Philippe I ("The Citizen King"); 1793–1850		6 October 1773; Paris son of Louis Philippe II, Duke of Orléans and Louise Marie Adélaïde de Bourbon	Maria Amalia of the Two Sicilies; 1809; 10 children	26 August 1850; Claremont aged 76	
Prince Ferdinand Philippe, Duke of Orléans		3 September 1810; Royal Palace of Palermo, Two Sicilies son of Louis Philippe I and Maria Amalia of Naples and Sicily	Duchess Helene of Mecklenburg-Schwerin; 1837; 2 children	13 July 1842; Sablonville, Hauts-de-Seine, France aged 31	
Prince Philippe, Count of Paris; 1850–1894		24 August 1838; Paris son of Prince Ferdinand Philippe, Duke of Orléans and Duchess Helen of Mecklenburg-Schwerin	Princess Marie Isabelle d'Orléans; 30 May 1864; 8 children	8 September 1894; Stowe House aged 56	
Prince Philippe, Duke of Orléans; 1894–1926		24 August 1869; York House, Twickenham son of Prince Philippe, Count of Paris and Princess Marie Isabelle d'Orléans	Maria Dorothea of Austria; 5 November 1896; No children	28 March 1926; Stowe House aged 56	
Prince Robert, Duke of Chartres		November 9, 1840; Paris son of Prince Ferdinand Philippe, Duke of Orléans and Duchess Helen of Mecklenburg-Schwerin	Françoise d'Orléans-Joinville; June 11, 1863; 5 children	December 5, 1910; Saint-Firmin, Hautes-Alpes aged 70	
Prince Jean, Duke of Guise; 1926–1940		4 September 1874; Paris son of Prince Robert, Duke of Chartres and Marie-Françoise d'Orléans	Isabelle d'Orléans, duchesse de Guise; 30 October 1899; 4 children	25 August 1940; Larache aged 66	
Prince Henri, Count of Paris; 1940–1999		5 July 1908; Nouvion-en-Thiérache son of Prince Jean, Duke of Guise and Isabelle d'Orléans, duchesse de Guise	Princess Isabel of Orléans-Braganza; 8 April 1931; 11 children	19 June 1999; Chérisy aged 91	
Henri, Count of Paris, Duke of France; 1999–		14 June 1933; Woluwe-Saint-Pierre son of Prince Henri, Count of Paris and Princess Isabel of Orléans-Braganza	Marie Therese of Württemberg; 5 July 1957; 5 children Micaela Cousiño Quiñones de León; 31 October 1984; No children		

==== Descendants of Elisabeth of France ====
Name of descendant	Portrait	Birth	Marriages and issue	Death	Miscellaneous
Balthasar Charles, Prince of Asturias; 1644–1646		17 October 1629, son of Philip IV of Spain and Elisabeth of France	Never Married	9 October 1646 (aged 16)	
Marie Thérèse, Queen of France; 1646–1683		10 September 1638, daughter of Philip IV of Spain and Elisabeth of France	Louis XIV; 6 children	30 July 1683 (aged 44)	
Louis, Dauphin of France; 1683–1711		1 November 1661, son of Maria Theresa of Spain and Louis XIV	Maria Anna Victoria of Bavaria; 3 children	14 April 1711 (aged 49)	
Louis, Duke of Burgundy; 1711–1712		16 August 1682, son of Louis, Dauphin of France and Maria Anna Victoria of Bavaria	Marie Adélaïde of Savoy; 3 children	18 February 1712 (aged 30)	
Louis, Duke of Brittany; 1712		8 January 1707 son of Louis, Duke of Burgundy and Marie-Adélaïde of Savoy	never married	8 March 1712 aged 5	
Louis XV; 1712—1774		15 February 1710, son of Louis, Duke of Burgundy and Marie-Adélaïde of Savoy	Marie Leszczyńska; 10 children	10 May 1774 (aged 64)	
Louis, Dauphin of France		4 September 1729, son of Louis XV and Marie Leszczyńska	Maria Teresa Rafaela of Spain; 1 child Maria Josepha of Saxony; 8 children	20 December 1765 (aged 36)	
Louis XVI; 1774—1793		23 August 1754, son of Louis, Dauphin of France and Marie-Josèphe of Saxony	Marie Antoinette; 4 children	21 January 1793 (aged 38)	
Louis XVII; 1793–1795		27 March 1785; Palace of Versailles son of Louis XVI and Marie Antoinette	never married	8 June 1795; Paris Temple (aged 10)	
Marie Thérèse of France; 1795–1851		19 December 1778; Château de Versailles daughter of Louis XVI and Marie Antoinette	Louis Antoine, Duke of Angoulême no children	19 October 1851; Kostanjevica Monastery, Nova Gorica, Slovenia (aged 72)	
Charles X of France		9 October 1757, son of Louis, Dauphin of France and Marie-Josèphe of Saxony	Marie Thérèse of Savoy; 3 children	6 November 1836 (aged 79)	
Charles Ferdinand, Duke of Berry		24 January 1778; Palace of Versailles son of Charles X of France and Marie Thérèse of Savoy	Princess Caroline of Naples; 1816; 4 children	14 February 1820; Paris (aged 42)	
Henri, Count of Chambord; 1851–1883		29 September 1820; Tuileries Palace son of Charles Ferdinand, Duke of Berry and Caroline Ferdinande Louise of Two Sicilies	Marie Thérèse of Austria-Este; November 1846; No children	24 August 1883; Gorizia (aged 63)	
Louise Marie Thérèse d'Artois		21 September 1819; Élysée Palace, Paris daughter of Charles Ferdinand, Duke of Berry and Caroline Ferdinande Louise of Two Sicilies	Charles III, Duke of Parma; 1849; 4 children	1 February 1864; Kostanjevica Monastery, Nova Gorica, Slovenia (aged 44)	
Robert I, Duke of Parma; 1883–1907		9 July 1848; Florence son of Charles III, Duke of Parma and Louise Marie Thérèse d'Artois	Maria Pia of the Two Sicilies; 1869; 12 children Maria Antonia of Portugal; 1884; 12 children	16 November 1907; Viareggio aged 63	
Henry, Duke of Parma; 1907–1939		13 June 1873; Wartegg son of Robert I, Duke of Parma and Maria Pia of the Two Sicilies	never married	16 November 1939; Pianore aged 66	
Joseph, Duke of Parma; 1939–1950		30 June 1875; Biarritz son of Robert I, Duke of Parma and Maria Pia of the Two Sicilies	never married	7 January 1950; Pianore aged 75	
Elias, Duke of Parma; 1950–1959		23 July 1880; Biarritz son of Robert I, Duke of Parma and Maria Pia of the Two Sicilies	Maria Anna of Austria; 25 May 1903; Vienna; 8 children	27 June 1959; Friedberg aged 79	
Robert II, Duke of Parma; 1959–1974		7 August 1909; Weilburg son of Elias, Duke of Parma and Maria Anna of Austria	never married	25 November 1974; Vienna aged 65	
Elisabetta of Bourbon-Parma; 1974–1983		17 March 1904; Vienna daughter of Elias, Duke of Parma and Maria Anna of Austria	never married	13 June 1983; Bad Ischl aged 79	
Infanta Alicia, Duchess of Calabria; 1983–2017		13 November 1917; Vienna daughter of Elias, Duke of Parma and Maria Anna of Austria	Infante Alfonso, Duke of Calabria; 30 November 1901; 3 children	28 March 2017; Madrid aged 99	
Prince Pedro, Duke of Calabria; 2017–present		16 October 1968; Madrid son of Infante Carlos, Duke of Calabria and Anne of Orléans	Sofía Landaluce y Melgarejo; 30 March 2001; 7 children		

==== Descendants of Christine of France ====
Name of descendant	Portrait	Birth	Marriages and issue	Death	Miscellaneous
Charles Emmanuel II, Duke of Savoy; 1663–1675		20 June 1634, son of Victor Amadeus I, Duke of Savoy and Christine Marie of France	Françoise Madeleine d'Orléans no children Marie Jeanne of Savoy; 2 children	12 June 1675	
Victor Amadeus II of Sardinia; 1675–1732		14 May 1666, son of Charles Emmanuel II, Duke of Savoy and Marie Jeanne of Savoy	Anne Marie d'Orléans; 6 children Anna Teresa Canalis di Cumiana; 8 children	31 October 1732	
Charles Emmanuel III of Sardinia; 1732–1773		27 April 1701, son of Victor Amadeus II of Sardinia and Anne Marie d'Orléans	Countess Palatine Anne Christine of Sulzbach; 1 child Polyxena of Hesse-Rotenburg; 6 children Elisabeth Therese of Lorraine; 3 children	20 February 1773	
Victor Amadeus III of Sardinia; 1773–1796		26 June 1726, son of Charles Emmanuel III of Sardinia and Polyxena of Hesse-Rotenburg	Maria Antonietta of Spain; 12 children	16 October 1796	
Charles Emmanuel IV of Sardinia; 1796–1819		24 May 1751, son of Victor Amadeus III of Sardinia and Maria Antonietta of Spain	Clotilde of France no children	6 October 1819	
Victor Emmanuel I of Sardinia; 1819–1824		24 July 1759, son of Victor Amadeus III of Sardinia and Maria Antonietta of Spain	Maria Teresa of Austria-Este; 7 children	10 January 1824	
Maria Beatrice of Savoy; 1824–1840		6 December 1792, daughter of Victor Emmanuel I of Sardinia and Maria Teresa of Austria-Este	Francis IV, Duke of Modena; 4 children	15 September 1840	
Francis V, Duke of Modena; 1840–1875		1 June 1819, son of Maria Beatrice of Savoy and Francis IV of Modena	Maria Antonia of Austria; Princess Adelgunde of Bavaria; 1 child	20 November 1875	
Archduke Ferdinand Karl Viktor of Austria-Este		20 July 1821, son of Maria Beatrice of Savoy and Francis IV of Modena	Archduchess Elisabeth Franziska of Austria; 1 child	15 December 1849	
Maria Theresa of Austria-Este; 1875–1919		2 July 1849, daughter of Archduke Ferdinand of Austria-Este and Archduchess Elisabeth Franziska of Austria	Ludwig III of Bavaria; 13 children	3 February 1919	
Rupprecht, Crown Prince of Bavaria; 1919–1955		18 May 1869, son of Ludwig III of Bavaria and Maria Theresa of Austria-Este	Duchess Marie Gabrielle in Bavaria; 5 children Princess Antonia of Luxembourg; 6 children	2 August 1955	
Albrecht, Duke of Bavaria; 1955–1996		3 May 1905, son of Rupprecht, Crown Prince of Bavaria and Duchess Marie Gabrielle in Bavaria	Countess Maria Draskovich of Trakostjan; 4 children Countess Marie-Jenke Keglevich of Buzin no children	8 July 1996	
Franz, Duke of Bavaria; 1996–		14 July 1933, son of Albrecht, Duke of Bavaria and Countess Maria Draskovich of Trakostjan	never married		

==== Descendants of Henrietta Maria of France ====
Name of descendant	Portrait	Birth and parents	Marriages and issue	Death	Miscellaneous
Charles II of England; 1669–1685		29 May 1630, son of Charles I of England and Henrietta Maria of France	Catherine of Braganza; No issue 8 illegitimate children	6 February 1685 (aged 54)	He is an ancestor of, among others, Diana, Princess of Wales, Sarah Ferguson, Spencer Perceval, Princess Alice, Duchess of Gloucester, Anthony Eden, Eleanor Calvert (who married John Parke Custis, stepson of George Washington), Mitford sisters and Samantha Cameron (wife of Conservative Leader David Cameron)
James II of England; 1685–1701		14 October 1633; St. James's Palace son of Charles I and Henrietta Maria of France	Anne Hyde; 3 September 1660; 8 children Mary of Modena; 21 November 1673; 7 children	16 September 1701; Château de Saint-Germain-en-Laye aged 67	
James Francis Edward Stuart; 1701–1766	James	10 June 1688; St. James's Palace son of James II of England and Mary of Modena	Clementina Sobieska; 3 September 1719; 2 children	1 January 1766; Palazzo Muti aged 77	
Charles Edward Stuart ("Bonnie Prince Charlie"); 1766–1788	Charles	31 December 1720; Palazzo Muti son of James Francis Edward Stuart and Clementina Sobieski	Louise of Stolberg-Gedern; No issue 1 illegitimate child	31 January 1788; Palazzo Muti aged 67	
Henry Benedict Stuart; 1788–1807	Henry	11 March 1725; Rome son of James Francis Edward Stuart and Clementina Sobieski	never married	13 July 1807; Frascati aged 82	
Henrietta Anne of England		16 June (Old Style) or 26 June (New Style) 1644, daughter of Charles I of England and Henrietta Maria of France	Philippe I, Duke of Orléans; 2 children	30 June 1670 (aged 26)	Her descendants include King Juan Carlos I of Spain, Henri, Grand Duke of Luxembourg and Franz, Duke of Bavaria, Infanta Alicia of Spain and Prince Alexander of Saxe-Gessaphe, among many others. After the extinction of the House of Stuart with the death of Henry Benedict Stuart, the rights of succession to the British Throne and the title of heir-general to Charles I of England passed to her descendants
Anne Marie d'Orléans		27 August 1669; Château de Saint-Cloud daughter of Princess Henrietta of England and Philippe of France, Duke of Orléans	Victor Amadeus II of Sardinia; 10 April 1684; 6 children	26 August 1728; Turin aged 58	
Charles Emmanuel III of Sardinia		27 April 1701, son of Victor Amadeus II of Sardinia and Anne Marie d'Orléans	Countess Palatine Anne Christine of Sulzbach; 1 child Polyxena of Hesse-Rotenburg; 6 children Elisabeth Therese of Lorraine; 3 children	20 February 1773	
Victor Amadeus III of Sardinia		26 June 1726, son of Charles Emmanuel III of Sardinia and Polyxena of Hesse-Rotenburg	Maria Antonietta of Spain; 12 children	16 October 1796	
Charles Emmanuel IV; 1807–1819		24 May 1751, son of Victor Amadeus III of Sardinia and Maria Antonietta of Spain	Clotilde of France no children	6 October 1819	
Victor Emmanuel I of Sardinia; 1819–1824		24 July 1759, son of Victor Amadeus III of Sardinia and Maria Antonietta of Spain	Maria Teresa of Austria-Este; 7 children	10 January 1824	
Maria Beatrice of Savoy; 1824–1840		6 December 1792, daughter of Victor Emmanuel I of Sardinia and Maria Theresa of Austria-Este	Francis IV, Duke of Modena; 4 children	15 September 1840	
Francis V, Duke of Modena; 1840–1875		1 June 1819, son of Maria Beatrice of Savoy and Francis IV of Modena	Maria Antonia of Austria; Princess Adelgunde of Bavaria; 1 child	20 November 1875	
Archduke Ferdinand Karl Viktor of Austria-Este		20 July 1821, son of Maria Beatrice of Savoy and Francis IV of Modena	Archduchess Elisabeth Franziska of Austria; 1 child	15 December 1849	
Maria Theresa of Austria-Este; 1875–1919		2 July 1849, daughter of Archduke Ferdinand of Austria-Este and Archduchess Elisabeth Franziska of Austria	Ludwig III of Bavaria; 13 children	3 February 1919	
Rupprecht, Crown Prince of Bavaria; 1919–1955		18 May 1869, son of Ludwig III of Bavaria and Maria Theresa of Austria-Este	Duchess Marie Gabrielle in Bavaria; 5 children Princess Antonia of Luxembourg; 6 children	2 August 1955	
Albrecht, Duke of Bavaria; 1955–1996		3 May 1905, son of Rupprecht, Crown Prince of Bavaria and Duchess Marie Gabrielle in Bavaria	Countess Maria Draskovich of Trakostjan; 4 children Countess Marie-Jenke Keglevich of Buzin no children	8 July 1996	
Franz, Duke of Bavaria; 1996–		14 July 1933, son of Albrecht, Duke of Bavaria and Countess Maria Draskovich of Trakostjan	never married		

==== Descendants of Gaston d'Orléans ====
Name of descendant	Portrait	Birth and parents	Marriages and issue	Death	Miscellaneous
Anne Marie Louise d'Orléans; 1660–1693		29 May 1627, daughter of Gaston de France, Duke of Orléans and Marie de Bourbon, Duchess of Montpensier	never married No issue	5 April 1693 (aged 65)	
Marguerite Louise d'Orléans; 1693–1721		28 July 1645, daughter of Gaston de France, Duke of Orléans and Marguerite of Lorraine	Cosimo III de' Medici, Grand Duke of Tuscany; 3 children	17 September 1721 (aged 76)	
Ferdinando de' Medici, Grand Prince of Tuscany		9 August 1663, son of Marguerite Louise d'Orléans and Cosimo III de' Medici, Grand Duke of Tuscany	Duchess Violante Beatrice of Bavaria; No issue	31 October 1713	
Gian Gastone de' Medici, Grand Duke of Tuscany; 1721–1737		24 May 1671, son of Marguerite Louise d'Orléans and Cosimo III de' Medici, Grand Duke of Tuscany	Anna Maria Franziska of Saxe-Lauenburg; No issue	9 July 1737	
Anna Maria Luisa de' Medici; 1737–1743		11 August 1667, daughter of Marguerite Louise d'Orléans and Cosimo III de' Medici, Grand Duke of Tuscany	Johann Wilhelm, Elector Palatine; No issue	18 February 1743	
Élisabeth Marguerite d'Orléans		26 December 1646, daughter of Gaston de France, Duke of Orléans and Marguerite of Lorraine	Louis Joseph, Duke of Guise; 1 child	17 March 1696 (aged 49)	
Françoise Madeleine d'Orléans		13 October 1648, Daughter of Gaston de France, Duke of Orléans and Marguerite of Lorraine	Charles Emmanuel II, Duke of Savoy; No issue	14 January 1664	
Line extinct since 1743

== See also ==
- House of Bourbon
- Marie de' Medici
- House of Medici
- House of Stuart
- Descendants of Louis XIV of France
- Descendants of Philippe I, Duke of Orléans
- Descendants of Philip V of Spain
- Descendants of Charles III of Spain
