= Descendants of Louis XIII =

Descendants of Louis XIII may refer to:

- Descendants of Louis XIV
- Descendants of Philippe I, Duke of Orléans
