= Descendants of Louis XIV =

Louis XIV of France

Louis XIV (1638–1715), the Bourbon monarch of the Kingdom of France, was the son of Louis XIII and Queen Anne.

The descendants of Louis XIV are numerous. Although only one of his children by his wife Maria Theresa of Spain survived past infancy, Louis had many illegitimate children by his mistresses. This article deals with the children of Louis XIV and in turn their senior descendants.

== Legitimate issue by Maria Theresa of Spain ==
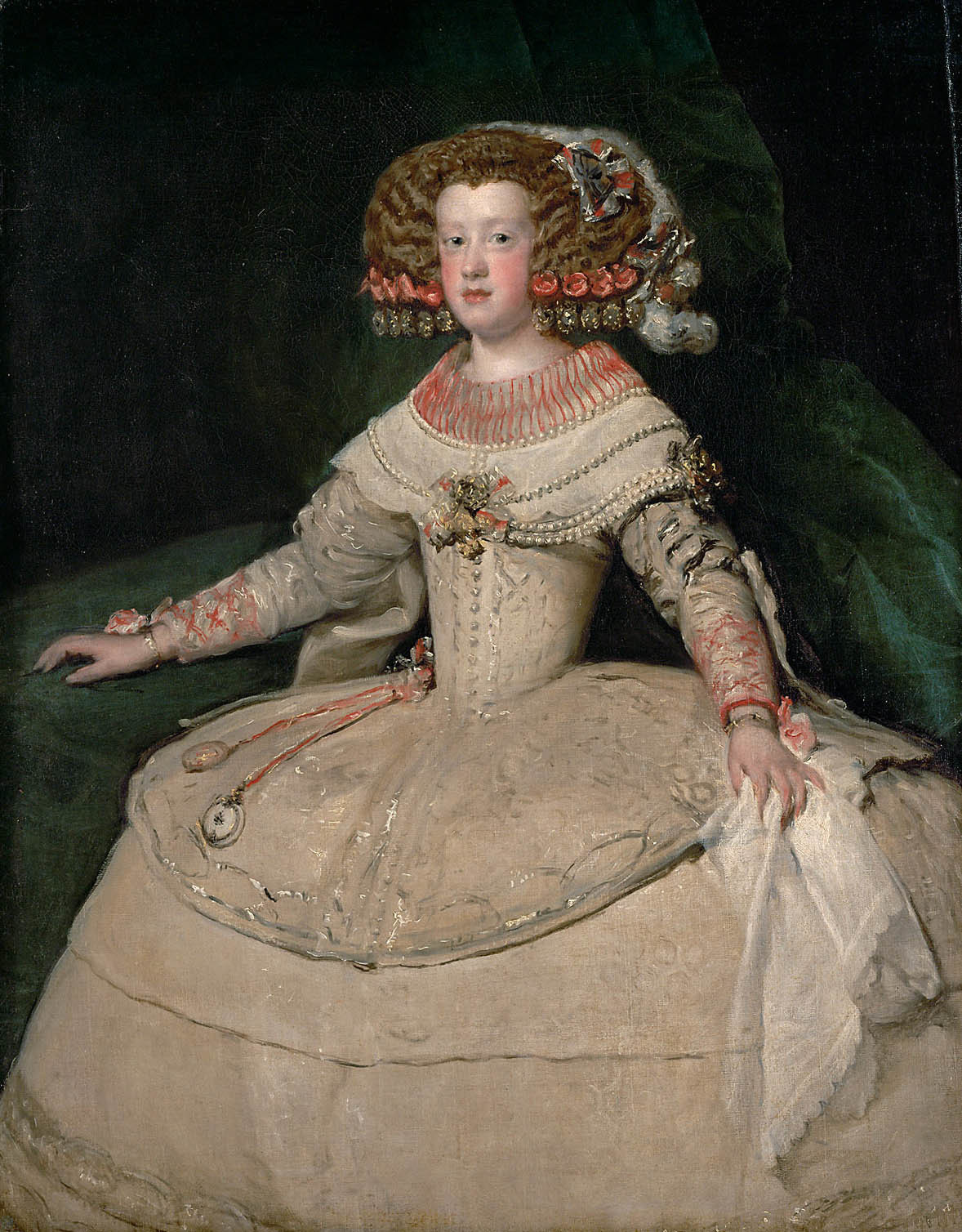
Infanta María Teresa by Diego Velázquez, c. 1652

She was born as Infanta María Teresa of Spain (also known as María Teresa of Austria, because she was by birth a member of Casa d'Austria, House of Austria), at the Royal Monastery of El Escorial. Maria was the daughter of Philip IV of Spain and Elisabeth of France. María Teresa thus combined the blood of Philip III of Spain and Margarita of Austria, on her father's side, and that of Henry IV of France and Marie de' Medici, on her mother's side.

In his turn, Philip III was the son of Philip II of Spain and Anna of Austria who was, herself, a daughter of Maximilian II, Holy Roman Emperor and Maria of Spain. Philip II and Maria of Spain were siblings, being both children of Charles V, Holy Roman Emperor and Isabella of Portugal. María Teresa, therefore, like many Habsburgs, was a product of years and generations of royal intermarriage between cousins.

In 1659, as the war with France began to wind down, a union between the two royal families, of Spain and of France, was proposed as a means to secure peace. María Teresa and Louis XIV were double first-cousins, and it was proposed that they wed. His father was Louis XIII, who was the brother of her mother, while her father was brother to Anne of Austria, his mother.

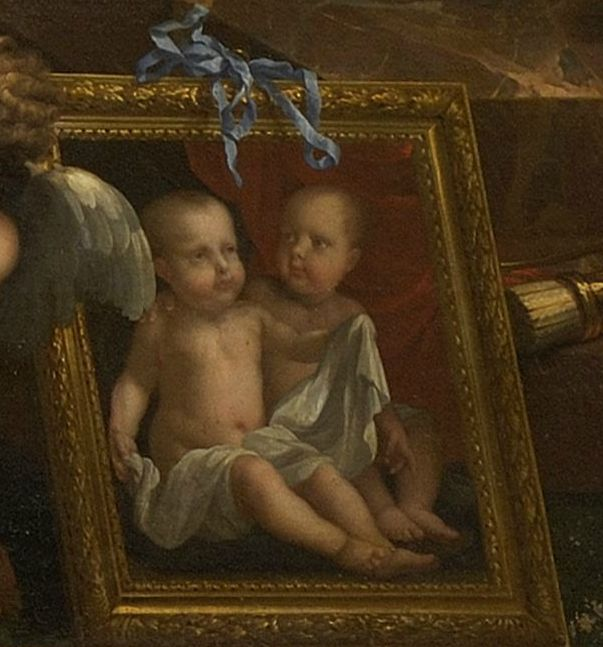
Daughters of France: Anne-Élisabeth and Marie-Anne

Such a prospect was intensely enticing to Anne of Austria, mother of Louis XIV and aunt of María Teresa, who desired an end to hostilities between her native country, Spain, and her adopted one, France, and who hoped this to come by her niece becoming her daughter-in-law. However, Spanish hesitation and procrastination led to a scheme in which Cardinal Mazarin, the First Minister of France, pretended to seek a marriage for his master with Margaret of Savoy. When Philip IV of Spain heard of the meeting at Lyon between the Houses of France and Savoy, he reputedly exclaimed of the Franco-Savoyard union that "it cannot be, and will not be". Philip then sent a special envoy to the French Court to open negotiations for peace and a royal marriage. After a marriage by proxy to the French king in Fuenterrabia, María Teresa became known as Marie-Thérèse. Her father, Philip IV, and the entire Spanish court accompanied the bride to the Isle of Pheasants, in the Bidassoa, where Louis and his court met her. On 7 June 1660, she departed from her native country of Spain. Two days later, on 9 June, the religious marriage took place in Saint-Jean-de-Luz Saint Jean-Baptiste church, which had recently been rebuilt on the site of the former 13th century church burned several times in the 15th and 16th centuries.

Besides the Grand Dauphin (see below), Louis XIV and Maria Theresa had three other children, none of whom lived more than half a year. Their names were Anne-Élisabeth (18 November 1662 – 30 December 1662), Marie-Anne (16 November 1664 – 26 December 1664) and Louis-François (14 June 1672 – 4 November 1672).

=== Louis, Dauphin of France ===
==== French Line ====
Name of Descendant	Portrait	Birth	Marriages and Issue	Death
Louis, Grand Dauphin ("The Great Dauphin")		1 November 1661; Palace of Versailles son of Maria Theresa of Spain and Louis XIV of France	Duchess Maria Anna Victoria of Bavaria; 7 March 1680; Châlons-sur-Marne; 3 children	14 April 1711 aged 49
Louis, Duke of Burgundy		16 August 1682; Palace of Versailles son of Louis, Dauphin of France and Maria Anna of Bavaria	Marie Adélaïde of Savoy; 7 December 1697; 3 children	18 February 1712 aged 29
Louis, Duke of Brittany		8 January 1707 son of Louis, Duke of Burgundy and Marie Adélaïde of Savoy	never married	8 March 1712 aged 5
Louis XV of France; 1715–1774		15 February 1710; Palace of Versailles son of Louis, Duke of Burgundy and Marie Adélaïde of Savoy	Maria Leszczyńska; 4 September 1725; 10 children	10 May 1774; Palace of Versailles aged 64
Louis, Dauphin of France		4 September 1729; Palace of Versailles son of Louis XV and Maria Leszczyńska	Maria Teresa Rafaela of Spain; 1744; 1 child Maria Josepha of Saxony, Dauphine of France; 1747; 8 children	20 December 1765; Palace of Fontainebleau aged 36
Louis, Duke of Burgundy (born 1751)		13 September 1751; Palace of Versailles son of Louis, Dauphin of France and Marie-Josèphe of Saxony	never married	22 March 1761; Palace of Versailles aged 9
Louis XVI of France; 1774–1793		23 August 1754; Palace of Versailles son of Louis, Dauphin of France and Marie-Josèphe of Saxony	Marie Antoinette; 16 May 1770; 4 children	21 January 1793; Place de la Concorde aged 38
Louis Joseph, Dauphin of France		22 October 1781; Palace of Versailles son of Louis XVI and Marie Antoinette	never married	4 June 1789; Château de Meudon aged 7
"Louis XVII of France"; 1793–1795		27 March 1785; Palace of Versailles son of Louis XVI and Marie Antoinette	never married	8 June 1795; Paris Temple aged 10
Louis XVIII of France; 1795–1824		17 November 1755; Palace of Versailles son of Louis, Dauphin of France and Marie-Josèphe of Saxony	Marie Josephine Louise of Savoy; 14 May 1771; No children	16 September 1824; Louvre Palace aged 68
Charles X of France; 1824–1830		9 October 1757; Palace of Versailles son of Louis, Dauphin of France and Marie-Josèphe of Saxony	Marie Thérèse of Savoy; 16 November 1773; 4 children	6 November 1836; Gorizia aged 79
Louis Antoine, Duke of Angoulême; 1830 (unproclaimed)		6 August 1775; Palace of Versailles son of Charles X of France and Marie Thérèse of Savoy	Marie-Thérèse-Charlotte of France; June 1799; No children	3 June 1844; Gorizia aged 68
Charles Ferdinand, Duke of Berry		24 January 1778; Palace of Versailles son of Charles X of France and Marie Thérèse of Savoy	Caroline Ferdinande Louise of Two Sicilies; 17 June 1816; 4 children	14 February 1820; Paris aged 42
Henri, Count of Chambord; 1830 (unproclaimed)		29 September 1820; Tuileries Palace son of Charles Ferdinand, Duke of Berry and Caroline Ferdinande Louise of Two Sicilies	Marie Thérèse of Austria-Este; November 1846; No children	24 August 1883; Gorizia aged 62

===== End of a Dynasty =====
"Louis XVII" or Louis-Charles, the Duke of Normandy, was the last male heir of the direct line of descent from Louis XIV. After his death in the temple in 1795, the succession rights passed to his uncle (the title of "Heir-Male" of Louis XIV would also have passed to him), who eventually became Louis XVIII, a younger brother of the Duke's Father, Louis XVI, and was as such a member of the senior line of descent from Louis XIV and the Bourbon-Vendôme line of the House of Bourbon.

After Louis XVIII's death, the throne went to yet another brother of Louis XVI, Charles, Count of Artois, who ascended the throne as Charles X of France. His son, Louis-Antoine, Duke of Angoulême, married Madame Royale, daughter of his uncle, Louis XVI of France, in a move to unite both lines of Royal Family. However, the duke and Madame Royale never had any children. Louis-Antoine was King of France for just about 20 minutes, after his father's abdication, but was himself forced to sign his abdication, granting all rights to the Duke of Orléans, who became Louis-Philippe, King of the French.

However, the remaining descendants of Charles X refused to give up their claims. From this struggle emerged the Legitimist and the Orleanist parties, the former of which supported the cause of Henri, Comte de Chambord, grandson of Charles X, and the latter supported the deposed House of Orléans, to which Louis-Philippe belonged and were his subsequent descendants. Therefore, according to primogeniture rules, Henri, Count de Chambord was the Heir-Male of Louis XIV and also the Legitimist claimant of the throne of France.

==== The Spanish Line ====
Henry, Count of Chambord died childless on 24 August 1883. He was the last descendant in the legitimate male line from Louis de France, Duke of Burgundy (duc de Bourgogne), eldest grandson of Louis XIV. Burgundy's youngest brother, Charles, Duke of Berry, died without any surviving issue. There remained only the descendants of Philip V of Spain, formerly Philippe de France, Duke of Anjou, who was Louis XIV's second grandson. Some French royalists recognized Louis-Philippe's grandson, Prince Philippe, Count of Paris, as the rightful heir; others transferred their loyalty to members of the Spanish Royal Family who were descended from Philip V.

In the aftermath of the War of Spanish Succession, Philip inherited the throne of Spain, but had to renounce his claim to the French throne as part of Treaty of Utrecht, in a move by the Grand Alliance powers to prevent the union of the two Crowns. This makes the pretendership pass from Chambord to the heir of Louis XIV's brother the duke of Orléans. Legitimists regard this as invalid, because under the fundamental law of French monarchy neither a king nor his heirs can renounce the claim to a throne they hold but do not possess.

Moreover, Philip quickly revived Spanish ambition; taking advantage of the power vacuum caused by Louis XIV's death in 1715, Philip announced he would claim the French crown if his infant nephew Louis XV died, and attempted to reclaim Spanish territory in Italy, precipitating the War of the Quadruple Alliance in 1717.

After the death of Henry, Count of Chambord, Louis XIV's senior descendant was Henry's distant cousin and brother-in-law, Juan, Count of Montizon, who was also the Carlist pretender to the throne of Spain, as he was the son of Carlos, Count of Molina. He was proclaimed Jean III, King of France and Navarre. He issued a declaration saying, "Having become Head of the House of Bourbon by the death of my brother-in-law and cousin, the Count of Chambord, I declare that I do not in any way renounce the rights to the throne of France which I have held since my birth".

Name of Descendant	Portrait	Birth	Marriages and Issue	Death
Philip V of Spain; 1700–1724, 1724-1746		19 December 1683; Palace of Versailles son of Louis, Grand Dauphin and Duchess Maria Anna Victoria of Bavaria	Maria Luisa of Savoy; 3 November 1701; Elisabeth Farnese; 24 December 1714; 9 children	9 July 1746; Madrid aged 62
Louis I of Spain; 1724-1724		25 August 1707; Madrid son of Philip V of Spain and Maria Luisa of Savoy	Louise Élisabeth d'Orléans; 1721; No children	31 August 1724; Madrid aged 17
Ferdinand VI of Spain; 1746-1759		23 September 1713; Madrid son of Philip V of Spain and Maria Luisa of Savoy	Barbara of Portugal; 1729; No children	10 August 1759; Madrid aged 45
Charles III of Spain; 1759–1788		20 January 1716; Madrid son of Philip V and Elizabeth Farnese	Maria Amalia of Saxony; 1738; 13 children	14 December 1788; Madrid aged 72
Charles IV of Spain; 1788–1808		11 November 1748; Portici son of Charles III of Spain and Maria Amalia of Saxony	Maria Luisa of Parma; 10 October 1846; 12 children	20 January 1819; Rome aged 70
Ferdinand VII of Spain; 1808-1808, 1813-1833		14 October 1784; El Escorial son of Charles IV of Spain and Maria Luisa of Parma	Princess Maria Antonia of Naples and Sicily; 1802; Maria Isabel of Portugal; 1816; Princess Maria Josepha of Saxony; 1819; Maria Christina of the Two Sicilies; 1829; 4 children	29 September 1833; Madrid aged 48
Isabella II of Spain; 1833-1868		10 October 1830; Madrid daughter of Ferdinand VII of Spain and Maria Christina of the Two Sicilies	Francisco de Asís, Duke of Cádiz; 1846; 5 children	9 April 1904; Paris aged 73
Alfonso XII of Spain; 1874-1885		28 November 1857; Madrid son of Isabella II of Spain and Francisco de Asís, Duke of Cádiz	Mercedes of Orléans; 1878; Maria Christina of Austria; 1879; 5 children	25 November 1885; Madrid aged 27
Alfonso XIII of Spain; 1936–1941		17 May 1886; Madrid son of Alfonso XII and Maria Christina of Austria	Victoria Eugenie of Battenberg; 31 May 1906; 7 children	28 February 1941; Rome aged 54
Alfonso, Prince of Asturias		10 May 1907; Madrid son of Alfonso XIII and Victoria Eugenie of Battenberg	Edelmira, Countess of Covadonga; 1933; Marta Esther Rocafort-Altuzarra; 1937; No children	6 September 1938; Miami aged 31
Infante Juan, Count of Barcelona		20 June 1913; San Ildefonso son of Alfonso XIII and Victoria Eugenie of Battenberg	Princess María de las Mercedes of Bourbon-Two Sicilies; 1935; 3 children	1 April 1993; Pamplona aged 79
Juan Carlos I 1975-2014		5 January 1938; Rome son of Infante Juan, Count of Barcelona and Princess María de las Mercedes of Bourbon-Two Sicilies	Queen Sofía of Spain; 1962; 3 children	
Felipe VI; 2014-present		30 January 1968; Madrid son of Juan Carlos I and Queen Sofía of Spain	Queen Letizia of Spain; 2004; 2 children	

===== Carlist Claimants =====
After his death, his sons and grandson, succeeded to the titles. His youngest son, Alfonso Carlos, willed his rights to the Spanish throne to Xavier, Duke of Parma, who became the Carlist pretender.

Name of Descendant	Portrait	Birth	Marriages and Issue	Death
Infante Carlos María Isidro of Spain; 1833–1845		29 March 1788; Madrid son of Charles IV of Spain and Maria Luisa of Parma	Maria Francisca of Portugal; 1816; Teresa, Princess of Beira; 1838; 2 children	10 March 1855; Trieste aged 66
Infante Carlos, Count of Montemolin; 1845–1861		31 January 1818; Madrid son of Infante Carlos, Count of Molina and Maria Francisca of Portugal	Maria Carolina of Bourbon-Two Sicilies; 10 July 1850; No children	31 January 1861; Trieste aged 43
Infante Juan, Count of Montizón; 1861–1868		15 May 1822; Royal Palace of Aranjuez son of Infante Carlos of Spain and Infanta Maria Francisca of Portugal	Maria Beatrix of Austria-Este; 6 February 1847; 2 children	21 November 1887; Hove aged 65
Infante Carlos, Duke of Madrid; 1868–1909		30 March 1848; Ljubljana son of Infante Juan, Count of Montizón and Maria Beatrix of Austria-Este	Princess Margherita of Bourbon-Parma; 4 February 1867; 5 children	18 July 1909; Varese aged 61
Infante Jaime, Duke of Madrid; 1909–1931		27 June 1870; Vevey son of Infante Carlos, Duke of Madrid and Princess Margherita of Bourbon-Parma	never married	2 October 1931; París aged 61
Infante Alfonso Carlos, Duke of San Jaime; 1931–1936		12 September 1849; London son of Infante Juan, Count of Montizón and Maria Beatrix of Austria-Este	Maria das Neves of Portugal; 26 April 1871; 1 child	29 September 1936; Vienna aged 87

At the death of Alfonso Carlos in 1936 most Carlists supported Prince Xavier of Bourbon-Parma whom Alfonso Carlos had named as regent of the Carlist Communion.

A minority of Carlists supported Archduke Karl Pius of Austria, Prince of Tuscany, a grandson through the female line of Carlos VII.

===== Spanish Legitimists =====
The rights to the throne of France passed to the line of Francis, Duke of Cadiz, who was the son of his grandfather's youngest brother. Francis was Isabella II's consort; therefore the claim was inherited by the Spanish Royal Family in the person of King Alfonso XIII. The title was next inherited by the eldest-surviving son of Alfonso, Infante Jaime, Duke of Segovia and subsequently his grandson and great-grandson. The current heir-male of Louis XIV and the representative of the rights of Philip V of Spain to the French throne is Louis Alphonse, Duke of Anjou, who is the second cousin of the present king of Spain, Felipe VI.

Name of Descendant	Portrait	Birth	Marriages and Issue	Death
Juan, Count of Montizón; 1883–1887		15 May 1822; Royal Palace of Aranjuez son of Infante Carlos of Spain and Infanta Maria Francisca of Portugal	Maria Beatrix of Austria-Este; 6 February 1847; 2 children	21 November 1887; Hove aged 65
Carlos, Duke of Madrid; 1887–1909		30 March 1848; Ljubljana son of Juan, Count of Montizón and Maria Beatrix of Austria-Este	Margherita of Parma; 4 February 1867; 5 children	18 July 1909; Varese aged 61
Jaime, Duke of Madrid; 1909–1931		27 June 1870; Vevey son of Carlos, Duke of Madrid and Margherita of Parma	never married	2 October 1931; París aged 61
Alfonso Carlos, Duke of San Jaime; 1931–1936		12 September 1849; London son of Juan, Count of Montizón and Maria Beatrix of Austria-Este	Maria das Neves of Portugal; 26 April 1871; 1 child	29 September 1936; Vienna aged 87
Alfonso XIII of Spain; 1936–1941		17 May 1886; Madrid son of Alfonso XII of Spain and Maria Christina of Austria	Victoria Eugenie of Battenberg; 31 May 1906; 7 children	28 February 1941; Rome aged 54
Infante Jaime, Duke of Segovia; 1941–1975		23 June 1908; Segovia son of Alfonso XIII of Spain and Victoria Eugenie of Battenberg	Emmanuelle de Dampierre; 4 March 1935; Rome; 2 children	20 March 1975; St. Gallen aged 67
Alfonso, Duke of Anjou and Cádiz; 1975–1989		20 April 1936; Rome son of Infante Jaime, Duke of Segovia and Emmanuelle de Dampierre	María del Carmen Martínez-Bordiú y Franco; 8 March 1972; Royal Palace of El Pardo; 2 children	30 January 1989; Beaver Creek aged 53
Louis Alphonse, Duke of Anjou; 1989–present		25 April 1974; Madrid son of Alfonso, Duke of Anjou and Cádiz and María del Carmen Martínez-Bordiú y Franco	Maria Margarita, Duchess of Anjou; 5 November 2004; Caracas; 4 children	

==== Marie Louise Élisabeth ====
However, if a non-Salic primogeniture is followed, the eldest surviving descendant, in other words, the heir-general of Louis XIV is the present Duke of Calabria. With the death of the Madame Royale, daughter of Louis XVI, the direct line of the French royal family became extinct. At her death, the heir-general of Louis XIV was also its heir-male – Henri, Count of Chambord ("Henri V"), who was the nephew of her husband and first cousin, Louis Antoine, Duke of Angoulême. However, with his death, the titles split, with the French succession rights passing to the descendants of Philip V of Spain and the status of heir-general passing to his sister, Louise Marie Thérèse d'Artois, who married Charles III, Duke of Parma, himself a direct descendant of Philip V of Spain. It is through this descent that the Duke of Calabria holds the designation of heir-general of Louis XIV.

The Duke is also a descendant of Louis XIV through another line. Louis XV's eldest daughter, Princess Louise Élisabeth of France married Philip, Duke of Parma, a son of King Philip V of Spain and Elisabeth Farnese.

Name of Descendant	Portrait	Birth	Marriages and Issue	Death
Marie Louise Élisabeth, Duchess of Parma; 1727–1759		14 August 1727; Daughter of Louis XV of France and Marie Leszczyńska	Philip, Duke of Parma; 26 August 1739; 3 children	6 December 1759; Versailles aged 32
Ferdinand, Duke of Parma; 1765–1802		20 January 1751; Parma son of Philip, Duke of Parma and Marie Louise Élisabeth	Archduchess Maria Amalia of Austria; 19 July 1769; 7 children	9 October 1802; Fontevivo aged 51
Louis of Etruria; 1802–1803		5 July 1773; Rome son of Ferdinand, Duke of Parma and Archduchess Maria Amalia of Austria	Maria Louisa of Spain, Duchess of Lucca; 25 August 1795; 2 children	27 May 1803; Florence aged 30
Charles II, Duke of Parma; 1803–1883		22 December 1799; Madrid son of Louis of Etruria and Maria Louisa of Spain, Duchess of Lucca	Maria Teresa of Savoy; 5 September 1820; 2 children	16 April 1883; Nice aged 84
Robert I, Duke of Parma; 1883–1907		9 July 1848; Florence son of Charles III, Duke of Parma and Louise Marie Thérèse of France	Maria Pia of the Two Sicilies; 1869; 12 children Maria Antonia of Portugal; 1884; 12 children	16 November 1907; Viareggio aged 63
Henry, Duke of Parma; 1907–1939		13 June 1873; Wartegg son of Robert I, Duke of Parma and Maria Pia of the Two Sicilies	never married	16 November 1939; Pianore aged 66
Joseph, Duke of Parma; 1939–1950		30 June 1875; Biarritz son of Robert I, Duke of Parma and Maria Pia of the Two Sicilies	never married	7 January 1950; Pianore aged 75
Elias, Duke of Parma; 1950–1959		23 July 1880; Biarritz son of Robert I, Duke of Parma and Maria Pia of the Two Sicilies	Maria Anna of Austria; 25 May 1903; Vienna; 8 children	27 June 1959; Friedberg, Styria aged 79
Robert II, Duke of Parma; 1959–1974		7 August 1909; Weilburg son of Elias, Duke of Parma and Maria Anna of Austria	never married	25 November 1974; Vienna aged 65
Elisabeth of Parma; 1974–1983		17 March 1904; Vienna daughter of Elias, Duke of Parma and Maria Anna of Austria	never married	13 June 1983; Bad Ischl aged 79
Maria Francesca of Parma; 1983–1994		5 September 1906; Vienna daughter of Elias, Duke of Parma and Maria Anna of Austria	never married	20 February 1994 aged 87
Alicia, Duchess of Calabria; 1994–2017		13 November 1917; Vienna daughter of Elias, Duke of Parma and Maria Anna of Austria	Infante Alfonso, Duke of Calabria; 30 November 1901; 3 children	28 March 2017 aged 99
Infante Carlos, Duke of Calabria		son of Alicia, Duchess of Calabria and Infante Alfonso, Duke of Calabria	Princess Anne, Duchess of Calabria; 11 May 1965; 5 children	5 October 2015 aged 77
Prince Pedro, Duke of Calabria		16 October 1968; Madrid son of Infante Carlos, Duke of Calabria and Princess Anne, Duchess of Calabria	Sofía Landaluce y Melgarejo; 30 March 2001; 7 children	

=== Marie Thérèse de France ===
Name of Descendant	Portrait	Birth	Marriages and Issue	Death
Marie Thérèse de France; 1667–1672		2 January 1667; Château de Saint-Germain-en-Laye daughter of Maria Theresa of Spain and Louis XIV	never married	1 March 1672; Château de Saint-Germain-en-Laye aged 5

=== Philippe Charles de France ===
Name of Descendant	Portrait	Birth	Marriages and Issue	Death
Philippe Charles de France; 1668–1671		5 August 1668; Château de Saint-Germain-en-Laye son of Maria Theresa of Spain and Louis XIV	never married	10 July 1671; Château de Saint-Germain-en-Laye aged 3

== Illegitimate issue ==
=== By Louise de La Vallière ===
==== Marie Anne de Bourbon ====
Name of Descendant	Portrait	Birth	Marriages and Issue	Death
Marie Anne de Bourbon; 1666–1739		2 October 1666; Vincennes daughter of Louise de La Vallière and Louis XIV	Louis Armand I, Prince of Conti; 16 January 1680; Château de Saint-Germain-en-Laye; No children	3 May 1739; Paris aged 72
Louis de Bourbon, Count of Vermandois; 1667–1683		2 October 1667; Château de Saint-Germain-en-Laye son of Louise de La Vallière and Louis XIV	never married	18 November 1683; Flanders aged 16

=== By Françoise-Athénaïs, Marquise de Montespan ===
Louis XIV and Françoise-Athénaïs had seven children in total and she was his most notorious mistress. Two of their children died very young. Their names were Louise Françoise de Bourbon (late March 1669 – 23 February 1672) and Louis-César de Bourbon (20 June 1672 – 10 January 1683).

==== Louis-Auguste de Bourbon, Duke of Maine ====
Name of Descendant	Portrait	Birth	Marriages and Issue	Death
Louis Auguste de Bourbon, Duke of Maine; 1670–1736		31 March 1670; Château de Saint-Germain-en-Laye son of Louis XIV and Françoise-Athénaïs, marquise de Montespan	Anne Louise Bénédicte de Bourbon; 1692; 7 children	14 May 1736; Château de Sceaux aged 66
Louis Auguste de Bourbon, Prince of Dombes; 1736–1755		4 March 1700; Versailles son of Louis Auguste de Bourbon, Duke of Maine and Anne-Louise-Bénédicte de Bourbon-Condé	never married	1 October 1755; Fontainebleau aged 55
Louis Charles de Bourbon, Count of Eu; 1755–1775		5 October 1701; Château de Sceaux son of Louis Auguste de Bourbon, Duke of Maine and Anne Louise Bénédicte de Bourbon	never married	13 July 1775; Château de Sceaux aged 73

==== Louise-Françoise de Bourbon ====
Name of Descendant	Portrait	Birth	Marriages and Issue	Death
Louise-Françoise de Bourbon; 1673–1743		1 June 1673; Tournai daughter of Louis XIV and Françoise-Athénaïs, marquise de Montespan	Louis III, Prince of Condé; 25 May 1685; 9 children	16 June 1743; Palais Bourbon aged 70
Charles de Bourbon, Count of Charolais; 1743–1760		19 June 1700; Château de Chantilly son of Louise-Françoise de Bourbon and Louis III, Prince of Condé	Jeanne de Valois-Saint Rémy; 1 child 2 illegitimate children	23 July 1760; Paris aged 60
Louis de Bourbon, Count of Clermont; 1760–1771		15 June 1709 son of Louise-Françoise de Bourbon and Louis III, Prince of Condé	Elisabeth-Claire Leduc; 1765; 2 children	16 July 1771; Paris aged 62
Louis François de Bourbon, Prince of Conti; 1771–1776		13 August 1717; Paris son of Louise Élisabeth de Bourbon and Louis Armand de Bourbon, Prince of Conti	Louise Diane d'Orléans; 22 January 1731; 2 children	2 August 1776; Paris aged 58
Louis François Joseph de Bourbon, Prince of Conti; 1776–1814		1 September 1734; Paris son of Louis François de Bourbon, Prince of Conti and Louise Diane d'Orléans	Marie Fortunée d'Este; 1759; No children	13 March 1814; Barcelona aged 80
Louis Philippe I of France ("The Citizen King"); 1814–1850		6 October 1773; Paris son of Louis Philippe II, Duke of Orléans and Louise Marie Adélaïde de Bourbon-Penthièvre	Maria Amalia of the Two Sicilies; 1809; 10 children	26 August 1850; Claremont aged 76
Prince Philippe, Count of Paris; 1850–1894		24 August 1838; Paris son of Prince Ferdinand Philippe, Duke of Orléans and Duchess Helen of Mecklenburg-Schwerin	Princess Marie Isabelle d'Orléans; 30 May 1864; 8 children	8 September 1894; Stowe House aged 56
Prince Philippe, Duke of Orléans; 1894–1926		24 August 1869; York House, Twickenham son of Prince Philippe, Count of Paris and Princess Marie Isabelle d'Orléans	Maria Dorothea of Austria; 5 November 1896; No children	28 March 1926; Stowe House aged 56
Prince Jean, Duke of Guise; 1926–1940		4 September 1874; Paris son of Prince Robert, Duke of Chartres and Marie-Françoise d'Orléans	Princess Isabelle d'Orléans; 30 October 1899; 4 children	25 August 1940; Larache aged 66
Prince Henri, Count of Paris; 1940–1999		5 July 1908; Le Nouvion-en-Thiérache son of Prince Jean, Duke of Guise and Princess Isabelle d'Orléans	Princess Isabel of Orléans-Braganza; 8 April 1931; 11 children	19 June 1999; Cherisy aged 91
Henri, Count of Paris & Duke of France; 1999–2019		14 June 1933; Woluwe-Saint-Pierre son of Henri, comte de Paris and Princess Isabel of Orléans-Braganza	Marie Therese of Württemberg; 5 July 1957; 5 children Micaela Cousiño Quiñones de León; 31 October 1984; No children	21 January 2019; Paris aged 85
Jean, Count of Paris; 2019-present		19 May 1965; Boulogne-Billancourt, France son of Henri, Count of Paris, Duke of France and Duchess Marie-Thérèse of Württemberg	Philomena, Countess of Paris; 2009; 5 children	

==== Louis César de Bourbon ====
Name of Descendant	Portrait	Birth	Marriages and Issue	Death
Louis César, Count of Vexin; 1672–1683		20 June 1672; Bussy-Saint-Georges son of Louis XIV and Françoise-Athénaïs, marquise de Montespan	never married	10 January 1683 aged 10

==== Louise Marie Anne de Bourbon ====
Name of Descendant	Portrait	Birth	Marriages and Issue	Death
Louise Marie Anne de Bourbon; 1674–1681		18 November 1674; Château de Saint-Germain-en-Laye daughter of Louis XIV and Françoise-Athénaïs, marquise de Montespan	never married	15 September 1681 aged 6

==== Françoise-Marie de Bourbon ====
Name of Descendant	Portrait	Birth	Marriages and Issue	Death
Françoise-Marie de Bourbon; 1677–1749		25 May 1677; Maintenon daughter of Madame de Montespan and Louis XIV	Philippe II, Duke of Orléans; 9 January 1692; 8 children	1 February 1749; Château de Saint-Cloud aged 71
Louis d'Orléans, Duke of Orléans; 1749–1752		4 August 1703; Palace of Versailles son of Françoise-Marie de Bourbon and Philippe II, Duke of Orléans	Margravine Auguste Marie Johanna of Baden-Baden; 18 June 1724; 2 children	4 February 1752; Paris aged 48
Louis Philippe I, Duke of Orléans; 1752–1785		12 May 1725; Palace of Versailles son of Louis d'Orléans, Duke of Orléans and Margravine Auguste Marie Johanna of Baden-Baden	Louise Henriette de Bourbon; 1743; 3 children	18 November 1785; Seine-Port aged 60
Louis Philippe II, Duke of Orléans; 1785–1793		13 April 1747; Château de Saint Cloud son of Louis Philippe I, Duke of Orléans and Louise Henriette de Bourbon	Louise Marie Adélaïde de Bourbon; 6 June 1769; 5 children	6 November 1793; Paris aged 46
Louis Philippe I of France ("The Citizen King"); 1793–1850		6 October 1773; Paris son of Louis Philippe II, Duke of Orléans and Louise Marie Adélaïde de Bourbon	Maria Amalia of the Two Sicilies; 1809; 10 children	26 August 1850; Claremont aged 76
Philippe, Count of Paris; 1850–1894		24 August 1838; Paris son of Prince Ferdinand Philippe, Duke of Orléans and Duchess Helen of Mecklenburg-Schwerin	Princess Marie Isabelle d'Orléans; 30 May 1864; 8 children	8 September 1894; Stowe House aged 56
Prince Philippe, Duke of Orléans; 1894–1926		24 August 1869; York House, Twickenham son of Prince Philippe, Count of Paris and Princess Marie Isabelle d'Orléans	Maria Dorothea of Austria; 5 November 1896; No children	28 March 1926; Stowe House aged 56
Prince Jean, Duke of Guise; 1926–1940		4 September 1874; Paris son of Prince Robert, Duke of Chartres and Marie-Françoise d'Orléans	Isabelle d'Orléans, duchesse de Guise; 30 October 1899; 4 children	25 August 1940; Larache aged 66
Prince Henri, Count of Paris; 1940–1999		5 July 1908; Nouvion-en-Thiérache son of Prince Jean, Duke of Guise and Isabelle d'Orléans, duchesse de Guise	Princess Isabel of Orléans-Braganza; 8 April 1931; 11 children	19 June 1999; Chérisy aged 91
Henri, Count of Paris & Duke of France; 1999–2019		14 June 1933; Woluwe-Saint-Pierre son of Prince Henri, Count of Paris and Princess Isabel of Orléans-Braganza	Marie Therese of Württemberg; 5 July 1957; 5 children Micaela Cousiño Quiñones de León; 31 October 1984; No children	21 January 2019; Paris aged 85
Jean, Count of Paris; 2019-present		19 May 1965; Boulogne-Billancourt, France son of Henri, Count of Paris, Duke of France and Duchess Marie-Thérèse of Württemberg	Philomena, Countess of Paris; 2009; 5 children	

==== Françoise-Marie de Bourbon ====
The current members of the House of Bonaparte is also descended from House of Orléans.

Name of Descendant	Portrait	Birth	Marriages and Issue	Death
Françoise-Marie de Bourbon; 1677–1749		25 May 1677; Maintenon daughter of Madame de Montespan and Louis XIV	Philippe II, Duke of Orléans; 9 January 1692; 8 children	1 February 1749; Château de Saint-Cloud aged 71
Louis d'Orléans, Duke of Orléans; 1749–1752		4 August 1703; Palace of Versailles son of Françoise-Marie de Bourbon and Philippe II, Duke of Orléans	Margravine Auguste Marie Johanna of Baden-Baden; 18 June 1724; 2 children	4 February 1752; Paris aged 48
Louis Philippe I, Duke of Orléans; 1752–1785		12 May 1725; Palace of Versailles son of Louis d'Orléans, Duke of Orléans and Margravine Auguste Marie Johanna of Baden-Baden	Louise Henriette de Bourbon; 1743; 3 children	18 November 1785; Seine-Port aged 60
Louis Philippe II, Duke of Orléans; 1785–1793		13 April 1747; Château de Saint Cloud son of Louis Philippe I, Duke of Orléans and Louise Henriette de Bourbon	Louise Marie Adélaïde de Bourbon; 6 June 1769; 5 children	6 November 1793; Paris aged 46
Louis Philippe I of France ("The Citizen King"); 1793–1850		6 October 1773; Paris son of Louis Philippe II, Duke of Orléans and Louise Marie Adélaïde de Bourbon	Maria Amalia of the Two Sicilies; 1809; 10 children	26 August 1850; Claremont aged 76
Louise-Marie Thérèse Charlotte Isabelle of Orléans; 1832–1850		3 April 1812 Palermo, Kingdom of Sicily daughter of Louis-Philippe of France and Maria Amalia of the Two Sicilies	Leopold I of Belgium; 1832; 4 children	11 October 1850; Ostend, Belgium age 38
Leopold II of Belgium; 1865–1909		9 April 1835; Brussels, Belgium son of Leopold I of Belgium and Louise-Marie Thérèse Charlotte Isabelle of Orléans	Marie Henriette of Austria; 1853; 6 children	17 November 1909; Brussels; 74 years
Princess Clémentine of Belgium		30 July 1872; Brussels, Belgium daughter of Leopold II of Belgium and Marie Henriette of Austria	Victor, Prince Napoléon; 1910; 2 children	9 March 1955; Nice age 82
Louis, Prince Napoléon (Napoleon VI); 1926–1997		23 January 1914, Brussels son of Prince Victor Napoléon and Clémentine of Belgium	Alix de Foresta; 16 August 1949; 4 children	3 May 1997; Prangins aged 83
Charles, Prince Napoléon; 1950-		19 October 1950; Boulogne-Billancourt son of Louis, Prince Napoléon and Alix de Foresta	Princess Béatrice of Bourbon-Two Sicilies; 19 December 1978; 3 children	
Jean-Christophe, Prince Napoléon; 1986-		11 July 1986; Saint Var, France, France son of Charles, Prince Napoléon and Princess Béatrice of Bourbon-Two Sicilies	Countess Olympia von und zu Arco-Zinneberg; 2019; 1 son	

==== Louis-Alexandre de Bourbon, Count of Toulouse ====
Name of Descendant	Portrait	Birth	Marriages and Issue	Death
Louis Alexandre de Bourbon, Count of Toulouse; 1678–1737		6 June 1678; Palace of Versailles son of Françoise-Athénaïs, marquise de Montespan and Louis XIV	Marie Victoire de Noailles; 2 February 1723; 1 child	1 December 1737; Château de Rambouillet aged 59
Louis Jean Marie de Bourbon, Duke of Penthièvre; 1737–1793		16 November 1725; Château de Rambouillet son of Louis-Alexandre de Bourbon, comte de Toulouse and Marie Victoire de Noailles	Princess Maria Teresa Felicitas of Modena; 1744; 7 children	4 March 1793; Vernon, Eure aged 68
Louise Marie Adélaïde de Bourbon; 1793–1821		13 March 1753; Hôtel de Toulouse daughter of Louis Jean Marie de Bourbon, Duke of Penthièvre and Princess Maria Teresa Felicitas of Modena	Louis Philippe II, Duke of Orléans; 6 June 1769; 5 children	27 June 1821; Ivry-sur-Seine aged 68
Louis Philippe I of France ("The Citizen King"); 1821–1850		6 October 1773; Paris son of Louis Philippe II, Duke of Orléans and Louise Marie Adélaïde de Bourbon	Maria Amalia of the Two Sicilies; 1809; 10 children	26 August 1850; Claremont aged 76
Prince Philippe, Count of Paris; 1850–1894		24 August 1838; Paris son of Ferdinand Philippe, Duke of Orléans and Duchess Helen of Mecklenburg-Schwerin	Princess Marie Isabelle of Orléans; 30 May 1864; 8 children	8 September 1894; Stowe House aged 56
Prince Philippe, Duke of Orléans; 1894–1926		24 August 1869; York House, Twickenham son of Prince Philippe, Count of Paris and Princess Marie Isabelle d'Orléans	Maria Dorothea of Austria; 5 November 1896; No children	28 March 1926; Stowe House aged 56
Prince Jean, Duke of Guise; 1926–1940		4 September 1874; Paris son of Prince Robert, Duke of Chartres and Marie-Françoise d'Orléans	Princess Isabelle d'Orléans; 30 October 1899; 4 children	25 August 1940; Larache aged 66
Prince Henri, Count of Paris; 1940–1999		5 July 1908; Nouvion-en-Thiérache son of Prince Jean, Duke of Guise and Princess Isabelle d'Orléans	Princess Isabel of Orléans-Braganza; 8 April 1931; 11 children	19 June 1999; Chérisy aged 91
Henri, Count of Paris & Duke of France; 1999–2019		14 June 1933; Woluwe-Saint-Pierre son of Prince Henri, Count of Paris and Princess Isabel of Orléans-Braganza	Marie Therese of Württemberg; 5 July 1957; 5 children Micaela, Countess of Paris; 31 October 1984; No children	21 January 2019; Paris aged 85
Jean, Count of Paris; 2019-present		19 May 1965; Boulogne-Billancourt, France son of Henri, Count of Paris, Duke of France and Duchess Marie-Thérèse of Württemberg	Philomena, Countess of Paris; 2009; 5 children	

== See also ==
- Descendants of Henry IV of France
- Descendants of Philippe I, Duke of Orléans
- Descendants of Philip V of Spain
- Descendants of Charles III of Spain, son of the precedent
- Bourbon Claim to the Spanish Throne
