= Kostanjevica Monastery =

Slovenian monastery

The Kostanjevica Monastery with Annunciation Church stands on a 143 m (469 ft)-tall hill dividing the town of Nova Gorica and the settlement of Pristava. It is located in Slovenia just 200 m (660 ft) from the Italy–Slovenia border. It is the burial place of Charles X of France and his family.

== History ==
In 1623 a small Carmelite sanctuary was erected just outside the limits of the town of Gorizia. In the next hundred years, a monastery was built next to the church, and the monastic chapel became an important site for pilgrims from Friuli and the Gorizia region. In 1781, the monastery was disbanded by Emperor Joseph II. In 1811, the Franciscan friars acquired the abandoned complex, re-establishing the monastery. Among other things, they brought a notable library containing some 10,000 books, which they transferred from the nearby Sveta Gora Monastery. Today, the library is named after Father Stanislav Škrabec, a renowned Slovene linguist from the 19th century who lived and worked in the monastery for more than 40 years.

The Kostanjevica Monastery was severely damaged in the Battles of the Isonzo during World War I. It was restored between 1924 and 1929. Until the end of World War II, the monastery was part of the town of Gorizia. In 1947, the border between Italy and Yugoslavia was set just a few hundred meters west of the monastery, and Kostanjevica became part of the newly established town of Nova Gorica.

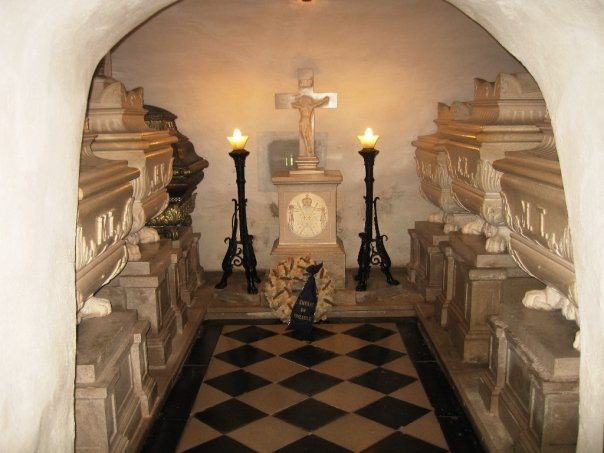
The crypt with the tombs of Charles X of France and other members of the House of Bourbon

== The crypt ==
In the 19th century, the crypt of the Franciscan monastery was used for the burial of members of the French House of Bourbon who went into exile after the July Revolution. Most of them had settled in Gorizia, then part of the Austrian Empire, in the 1830s. Those buried in the crypt are:

Scheme of the crypt

Louise Marie Thérèse of Artois Granddaughter of Charles X, sister of Henri	†	Louis Antoine, Duke of Angoulême Eldest son of Charles X, pretender to the throne (Louis XIX)
Henri, Count of Chambord Grandson of Charles X, pretender to the throne (Henry V)	†	Charles X of France King of France (1824–1830), younger brother of the Kings; Louis XVI and Louis XVIII
Maria Theresa of Austria-Este Wife of Henri	†	Marie Thérèse Charlotte of France Daughter of Louis XVI, Wife and cousin of Louis-Antoine
	↑ ↑ ↑	Pierre Louis; Jean Casimir de Blacas d'Aulps Minister and diplomat
