= Descendants of Philippe I, Duke of Orléans =

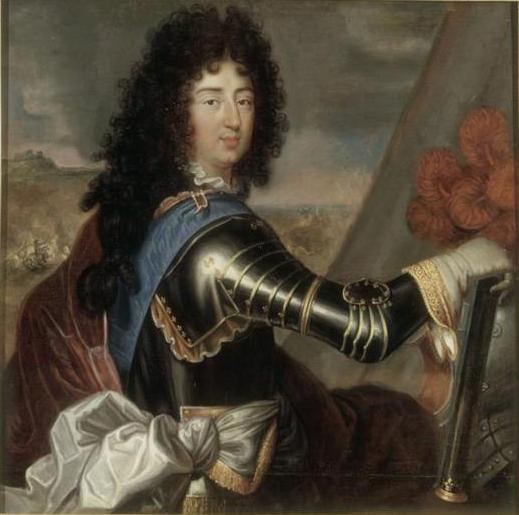
Philippe I d'Orléans, painted by Michel Corneille the Elder wearing armour with fleur-de-lys of the Sash of the Order of the Holy Spirit.

Philippe de France, Duke of Orléans was the brother of Louis XIV and the younger son of Louis XIII and Anne of Austria.

A member of the House of Bourbon, he is the founder of the current House of Orléans. His heirs formed a junior collateral branch of the royal dynasty. They include the second duke, who governed France during the minority of Louis XV in the Regency era; one French monarch, Louis Philippe I; and the Orléanist pretenders to the French throne still flourishing in the 21st century. The accumulation of the vast wealth which the House of Orléans would possess and use to influence both politics and court life (until it was confiscated during the French Revolution) began with Philippe, a lifelong beneficiary of his brother's largesse.

He was originally known by the title "Duke of Anjou". In 1660, his paternal uncle, Gaston, Duke of Orléans, died. The dukedom of Orléans was an appanage traditionally conferred upon the younger brother of the French king whenever available. Philippe exchanged Anjou for Orléans. As a son of a French king, Philippe ranked as a fils de France, and as the king's younger brother, he was invariably referred to at court simply as Monsieur.

== Issue by Henrietta-Anne 'Minette' of England ==
=== Henrietta Anne and Philippe : Relationship Background ===
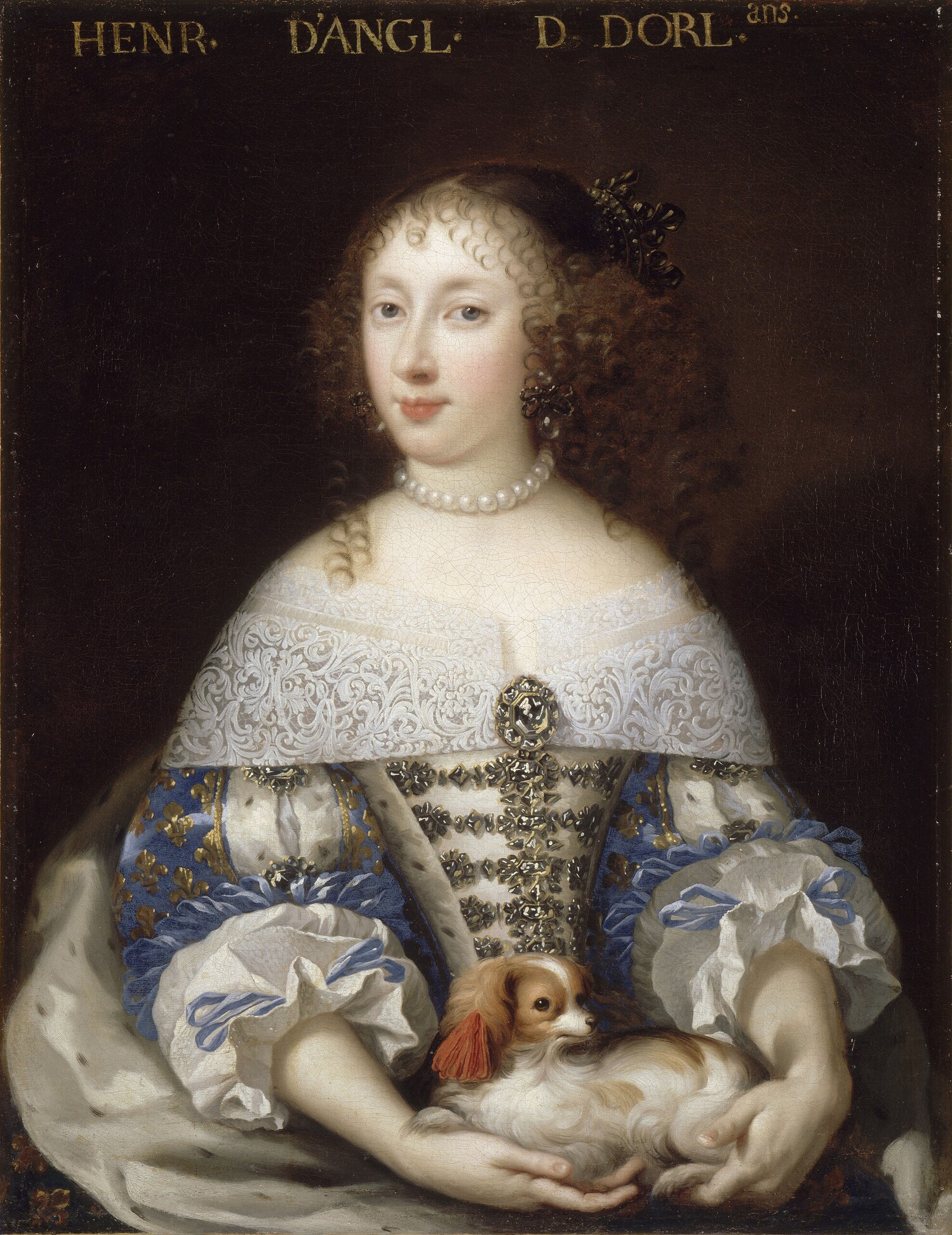
Princess Henrietta-Anne of England Philippe's first wife

On 31 March 1661, he married his first cousin, Princess Henrietta of England, daughter of King Charles I of England, in the chapel of the Palais-Royal in Paris. Both were grandchildren of Henry IV of France and Marie de' Medici. She was known at court as Madame, Henriette d'Angleterre (Henrietta of England) or affectionately as Minette and was a famed beauty. Philippe was said to have doted on Henriette for the first year of their marriage, but their relationship soon turned sour when she allegedly began an affair with the Count of Guiche and went on to seek comfort from others. Philippe openly paraded his mignons in front of his wife and the whole court. Among them were Armand de Gramont, Count of Guiche, known for his arrogance and good looks, the marquis de Châtillon, and his first lover Philip Julian Mancini. Meanwhile, Henriette proved to be very popular at court as a pretty, good-natured princess, much to Philippe's annoyance.

She soon attracted the attention of the King. In order to hide this attraction from the King's mother and wife, Henriette and Louis invented the story that he was constantly in Henriette's company in order to be close to one of her ladies-in-waiting, Louise de La Vallière. In time, Louis indeed fell in love with Louise and made her his mistress.

Reluctantly, and somewhat bitterly, Henriette stepped aside. She is said to have eventually taken one of her husband's earlier conquests, Armand de Gramont as a lover. This caused all sorts of arguments at the Palais Royal, where the Orléans lived. Despite this marital dissension, several children were born of their union. However, Henriette, known for her fragile and delicate health, had four miscarriages in the space of five years. By the time of the birth of Anne Marie, the couple was notorious for the frequency of their quarrels at court and at home in the Palais-Royal. After joining his brother Louis, the Queen, Mademoiselle, Madame de Montespan, and Louise de La Vallière at a military campaign in northern France, the ducal couple returned to Saint-Cloud. It was there that the Duchess died at the age of twenty-six.

The death of the duchess on 30 June 1670 was popularly attributed to poison. The main suspects of this alleged crime were the Duke himself and the Chevalier de Lorraine. Although the duke may not have been involved, the enmity between Minette and the Chevalier de Lorraine was not a hidden truth. After an autopsy was performed, it was reported that Henrietta-Anne had died of peritonitis caused by an ulcer. During his marriage to Henriette-Anne, Philippe was heard to have said that he had loved her for fifteen days.

=== Children ===
#	Name of Descendant	Portrait	Birth	Death	Relations	Marriages	Issue
1	Marie Louise d'Orléans		March 26, 1662	February 12, 1689	Daughter of Philippe de France and Henrietta of England	Married to Charles II of Spain	No Issue
2	Anne Marie d'Orléans		August 27, 1669	August 26, 1728	Daughter of Philippe de France and Henrietta of England	Married to Victor Amadeus II of Sardinia	3 children, 2 daughters, 1 son

=== Grandchildren ===
#	Name of Descendant	Portrait	Birth	Death	Relations	Marriage	Issue
1	Maria Adelaide of Savoy		December 6, 1685	February 12, 1712	Daughter of Anne Marie d'Orléans and Victor Amadeus II of Sardinia; Granddaughter of Philippe de France and Henrietta of England	Married to Louis, Dauphin of France	1 child, 1 son
2	Maria Luisa Gabriella of Savoy		August 17, 1688	February 14, 1714	Daughter of Anne Marie d'Orléans and Victor Amadeus II of Sardinia; Granddaughter of Philippe de France and Henrietta of England	Married to Philip V of Spain	2 Children, 2 sons
3	Charles Emmanuel III of Sardinia		April 27, 1701	February 20, 1773	Son of Anne Marie d'Orléans and Victor Amadeus II of Sardinia; Grandson of Philippe de France and Henrietta of England	Married (1) Anne Christine Louise of Bavaria (2) Polyxena Christina of Hesse-Rotenburg (3) Elisabeth Therese of Lorraine	4 children, 2 sons, 2 daughters

=== Great-grandchildren ===
#	Name of Descendant	Portrait /Coat of Arms	Birth	Death	Relations	Marriages	Issue
2	Louis I of Spain		August 25, 1707	August 31, 1724	Son of Maria Louisa of Savoy and Philip V of Spain; Grandson of Anne Marie d'Orléans and Victor Amadeus II of Sardinia; Great-Grandson of Philippe de France and Henrietta of England	Married; Louise Élisabeth d'Orléans	No Issue
3	Ferdinand VI of Spain		September 23, 1713	August 10, 1759	Son of Maria Louisa of Savoy and Philip V of Spain; Grandson of Anne Marie d'Orléans and Victor Amadeus II of Sardinia; Great-Grandson of Philippe de France and Henrietta of England	Married; Barbara of Portugal	No Issue
4	Victor Amadeus III of Savoy		June 26, 1726	October 16, 1796	Son of Charles Emmanuel III of Sardinia and Polyxena Christina of Hesse-Rotenburg; Grandson of Anne Marie d'Orléans and Victor Amadeus II of Sardinia; Great-Grandson of Philippe de France and Henrietta of England	Married; Maria Antonia Ferdinanda of Spain	9 children, 5 sons, 4 daughters
5	Eleonora Maria Teresa of Savoy		1728	1781	Daughter of Charles Emmanuel III of Sardinia and Polyxena Christina of Hesse-Rotenburg; Granddaughter of Anne Marie d'Orléans and Victor Amadeus II of Sardinia; Great-Granddaughter of Philippe de France and Henrietta of England	unmarried	No issue
6	Maria Luisa Gabriella of Savoy		1729	1767	Daughter of Charles Emmanuel III of Sardinia and Polyxena Christina of Hesse-Rotenburg; Granddaughter of Anne Marie d'Orléans and Victor Amadeus II of Sardinia; Great-Granddaughter of 'Philippe de France and Henrietta of England	unmarried, a nun	No issue
7	Maria Felicita		1730	1801	Daughter of Charles Emmanuel III of Sardinia and Polyxena Christina of Hesse-Rotenburg; Granddaughter of Anne Marie d'Orléans and Victor Amadeus II of Sardinia; Great-Granddaughter of Philippe de France and Henrietta of England	unmarried	No issue
8	Benedetto Maria Maurizio of Savoy (Duke of Chablais and Marchese of Ivrea)		1741	1808	Son of Charles Emmanuel III of Sardinia and Elisabeth Teresa of Lorraine; Grandson of Anne Marie d'Orléans and Victor Amadeus II of Sardinia; Great-Grandson of Philippe de France and Henrietta of England	Married his niece Maria Ana	No issue

=== Further Descent ===
#	Name of Descendant	Portrait	Birth	Death	Relations	Marriages	Issue
1	Louise Élisabeth, Duchess of Parma		August 14, 1727	December 6, 1759	Daughter of Louis XV of France and Maria Leszczyńska	Married to Philip, Duke of Parma	3 children, 2 daughters, 1 son
2	Isabella of Parma		31 December 1741	November 27, 1763	Daughter of Louise Élisabeth, Duchess of Parma and Philip, Duke of Parma	Married to Joseph II, Holy Roman Emperor	1 child, 1 daughter
3	Maria Theresia		March 20, 1762	January 23, 1770	Daughter of Isabella of Parma and Joseph II, Holy Roman Emperor	Unmarried	No Issue
4	Ferdinand, Duke of Parma		January 20, 1751	October 9, 1802	Son of Louise Élisabeth, Duchess of Parma and Philip, Duke of Parma	Married; Archduchess Maria Amalia of Austria	4 children, 1 son, 3 daughters
5	Princess Caroline of Parma		November 22, 1770	March 1, 1804	Daughter of Ferdinand, Duke of Parma and Maria Amalia of Austria	Married; Maximilian, Hereditary Prince of Saxony	7 children, 3 sons, 4 daughters
6	Louis of Etruria		5 July 1773	27 May 1803	Son of Ferdinand, Duke of Parma and Maria Amalia of Austria	Married; Maria Louisa, Duchess of Lucca	2 children, 1 son, 1 daughter
7	Maria Antonia		28 November 1774	20 February 1841	Daughter of Ferdinand, Duke of Parma and Archduchess Marie Amalie of Austria.	Unmarried, a nun	No Issue
8	Charlotte of Parma		September 7, 1777	1812	Daughter of Ferdinand, Duke of Parma and Maria Amalia of Austria	Unmarried, a nun	No Issue
9	Maria Luisa of Parma		December 9, 1751	January 2, 1819	Daughter of Louise Élisabeth, Duchess of Parma and Philip, Duke of Parma	Married to Charles IV of Spain	7 children, 3 sons, 4 daughters
10	Carlota Joaquina of Spain		25 April 1775	7 January 1830	Daughter of Maria Luisa of Parma and Charles IV of Spain	Married to John VI of Portugal	8 children, 2 sons, 6 daughters
11	Maria Amalia		January 9, 1779	July 22, 1798	Daughter of Maria Luisa of Parma and Charles IV of Spain	Married to Infante Antonio Pascual of Spain	Stillborn son
12	Maria Louisa		July 6, 1782	March 13, 1824	Daughter of Maria Luisa of Parma and Charles IV of Spain	Married to Louis of Etruria	2 children, 1 son, 1 daughter
13	Ferdinand VII of Spain		October 14, 1784	September 29, 1833	Son of Maria Luisa of Parma and Charles IV of Spain	Married (1) Maria Antonia of Naples (2) Maria Isabel of Portugal (3) Maria Josepha Amalia of Saxony (4) Maria Christina of the Two Sicilies	2 children, 2 daughters
14	Charles, Count of Molina		March 29, 1788	March 10, 1855	Son of Maria Luisa of Parma and Charles IV of Spain	Married (1) Maria Francisca of Portugal (2) Teresa, Princess of Beira	2 children, 2 sons
15	Maria Isabella of Spain		June 6, 1789	September 13, 1848	Daughter of Maria Luisa of Parma and Charles IV of Spain	Married to Francis I of the Two Sicilies	12 children, 6 sons, 6 daughters
16	Infante Francisco de Paula of Spain		10 March 1794	13 August 1865	Son of Maria Luisa of Parma and Charles IV of Spain	Married; Princess Luisa Carlotta of the Two Sicilies	8 children, 4 sons, 4 daughters

== Issue by Elisabeth-Charlotte 'Liselotte' of the Palatinate ==
=== Elisabeth-Charlotte and Philippe : Relationship Background ===
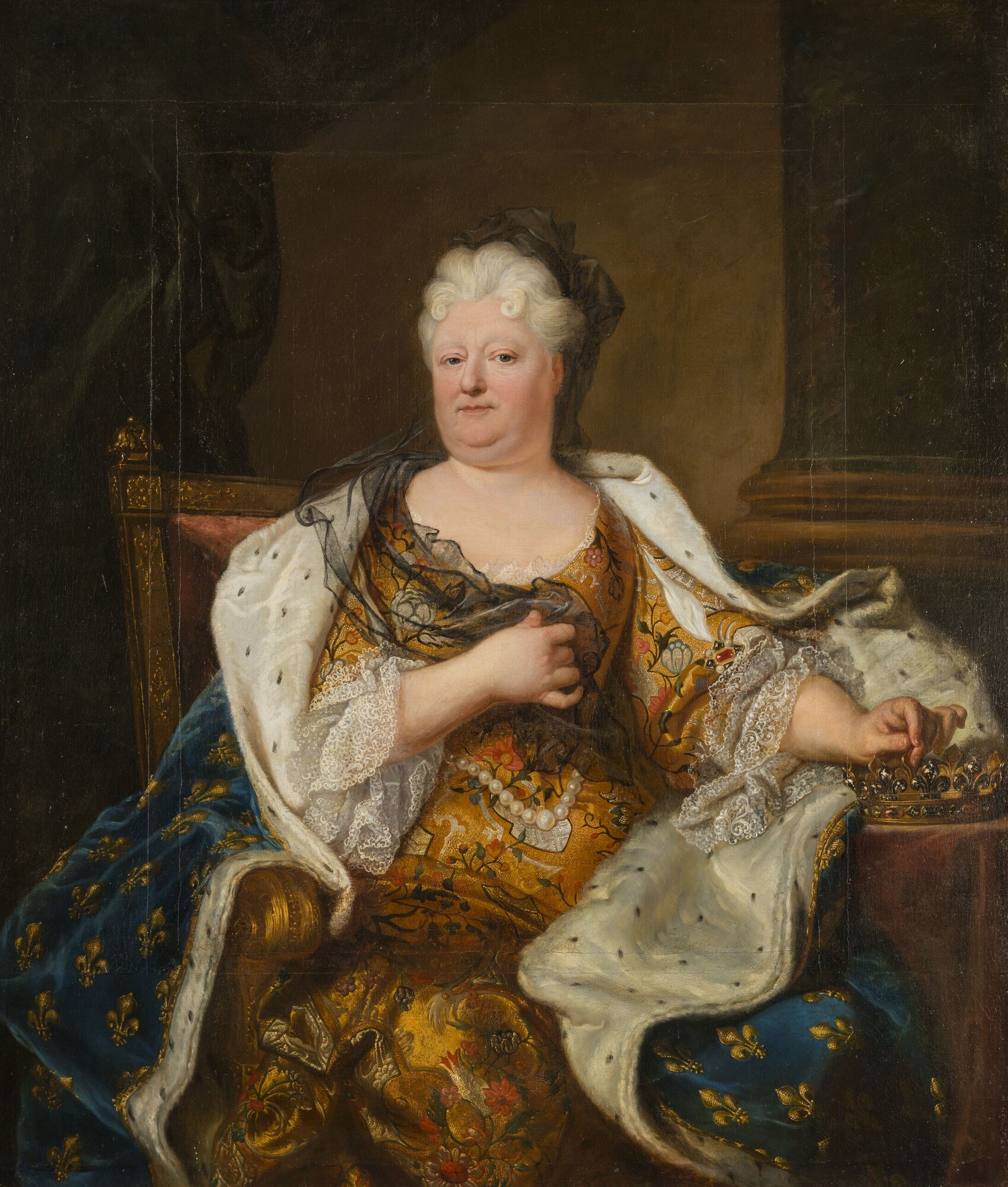
Liselotte in later years

Philippe's confidante, Anna Gonzaga, Princess Palatine, arranged his second marriage to her husband's niece, Elisabeth Charlotte, the nineteen-year-old daughter of Charles I Louis, Elector Palatine. Upon her arrival in France, "Liselotte" converted to Roman Catholicism, before the marriage ceremony.

The couple was married by proxy, in the cathedral Saint-Étienne at Metz, on 16 November 1671. The maréchal du Plessis-Praslin represented the Duke of Orléans. Philippe and Liselotte first met on the road between the towns of Châlons and Bellay.

Whereas Philippe’s first wife, Henriette of England, was celebrated at court for her beauty and conversational brilliance, Elisabeth-Charlotte of the Palatinate did not conform to the same aesthetic or social expectations of Versailles. Contemporary observers often remarked upon the contrast.

Philippe is reported to have taken a direct interest in Liselotte’s public presentation, particularly in matters of dress and court appearance, though the extent and tone of this involvement vary across sources.

Their marriage produced Philippe’s only surviving legitimate son, securing the Orléans line.

Liselotte also became known for her brusque candor, upright character, lack of vanity, and prolific foreign correspondence about the daily routine and frequent scandals of Versailles. Her letters record how willingly she gave up sharing Philippe's bed at his request after their children's births, and how unwillingly she endured the presence of his minions in their household, which caused the couple to quarrel.

But she frequently acknowledged that Philippe's treatment of her was less offensive than the impertinences his entourage indulged in at her expense, and the lack of protection he afforded her and their children against the hostile intrigues she believed were directed at her by spiteful courtiers, especially Madame de Maintenon.

=== Children ===
#	Name of Descendant	Portrait	Birth	Death	Relations	Marriages	Issue
1	Philippe II, Duke of Orléans		August 2, 1674	December 2, 1723	Son of Philippe d'Orléans and Elizabeth Charlotte of Bavaria	Married to Françoise-Marie de Bourbon	7 children: 1 son, 6 daughters
2	Élisabeth Charlotte, Princess of Commercy		September 13, 1676	December 23, 1744	Daughter of Philippe d'Orléans and Elizabeth Charlotte of Bavaria	Married to Leopold, Duke of Lorraine	5 children: 3 sons, 2 daughters

=== Grandchildren ===
#	Name of Descendant	Portrait	Birth	Death	Relations	Marriages	Issue
1	Marie Louise Élisabeth d'Orléans		August 20, 1695	July 21, 1719	Daughter of Philippe d'Orléans and Françoise-Marie de Bourbon	Married to Charles de France, duc de Berry	No issue
2	Louise Adélaïde, Abbess of Chelles		August 13, 1698	February 10, 1743	Daughter of Philippe d'Orléans and Françoise-Marie de Bourbon	Unmarried, a nun	No Issue

== See also ==
- House of Orléans
- Descendants of Louis XIV of France
- Descendants of Henry IV of France
- Descendants of Philip V of Spain
