= Chérisy =

- Commune
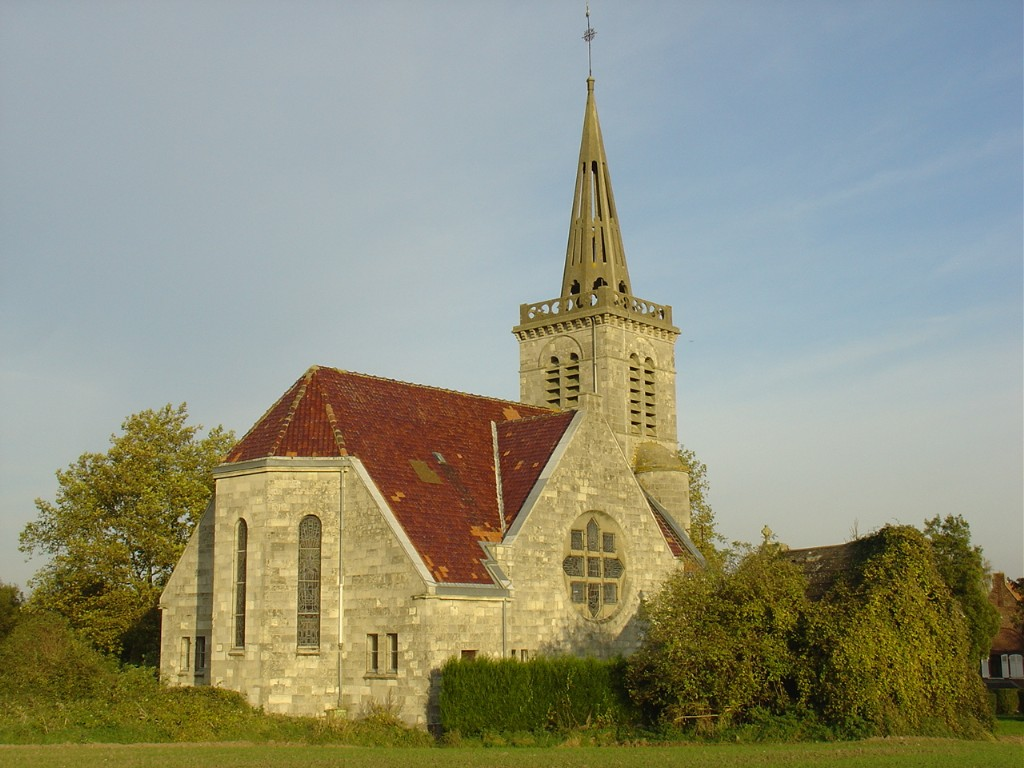
- The church of Chérisy

- Coat of arms
- Location of Chérisy
- Location within France Location within Hauts-de-France
- Coordinates: 50°14′06″N 2°54′46″E
- Country: France
- Region: Hauts-de-France
- Department: Pas-de-Calais
- Arrondissement: Arras
- Canton: Bapaume
- Intercommunality: CC Sud-Artois

Government
  - Mayor (2020–2026): Patrick Visentin
- Area^{1}: 6.29 km^{2} (2.43 sq mi)
- Elevation: 66 m (217 ft)
- Highest elevation: 98 m (322 ft)
- Lowest elevation: 52 m (171 ft)
- Population (2023): 293
  - Density: 46.6/km^{2} (121/sq mi)
- Time zone: UTC+01:00 (CET)
  - Summer (DST): UTC+02:00 (CEST)
- INSEE/Postal code: 62223 /62128
- ^{1} French Land Register data, which excludes lakes, ponds, glaciers > 1 km^{2} (0.386 sq mi or 247 acres) and river estuaries.

Chérisy (French pronunciation: [ʃeʁizi]) is a commune in the Pas-de-Calais department in the Hauts-de-France region of France.

== Geography ==
A small farming village located 9 miles (15 km) southeast of Arras on the D9 junction with the D38 road.

== Population ==
Historical population
Year	Pop.	±% p.a.
1968	188	—
1975	175	−1.02%
1982	189	+1.11%
1990	209	+1.27%
1999	212	+0.16%
2007	253	+2.23%
2012	304	+3.74%
2017	293	−0.73%
2023	293	+0.00%
Source: INSEE

== Places of interest ==
- The church of Saint-Vaast, rebuilt, like most of the village after the ravages of World War I.
- World War I cemeteries.

== World War I ==
Chérisy village, south-east of Arras, in the Pas-de-Calais, France, was captured by the 18th Division on 3 May 1917, but lost the same night. On 15 September 1917 a trench raid was carried out by british forces in the area.

It then remained in German hands until it was retaken by the Canadian Corps on 27 August 1918. It was in the retaking of Chérisy that Major Georges Philias Vanier, the future GOC of the Royal 22^{e} Régiment and Governor General of Canada (1959–1967) was wounded, as a result of which his leg was amputated. In addition to Vanier, GOC of the 26th Battalion, Lt-Col. A. E. G. McKenzie was killed during action on 28 August 1918.

Quebec Cemetery, Chérisy.
Many of those buried there are men of the 22nd and 24th Battalions Canadian Infantry (both from Quebec), were killed between 26 August and 28 September 1918. Quebec Cemetery contains 195 First World War burials, 12 of them unidentified. English émigré to Canada, Private Alfred S. Loose was killed on 28 September 1918, aged 25 years. The cemetery was designed by G. H. Goldsmith.

Sun Quarry Cemetery
Located approx. 1 kilometer southeast of Cherisy and contains 191 First World War burials. Many of the casualties of the August–September 1918 fighting that took place in the area. The cemetery contains many men of the 26th Battalion Canadian Infantry (from New Brunswick). The cemetery was also designed by G. H. Goldsmith.

== See also ==
- Communes of the Pas-de-Calais department
