= Louis Antoine, Duke of Angoulême =

French prince (1775–1844)

Louis XIX
- King of France; Dauphin of France; Duke of Angoulême; Count of Marnes
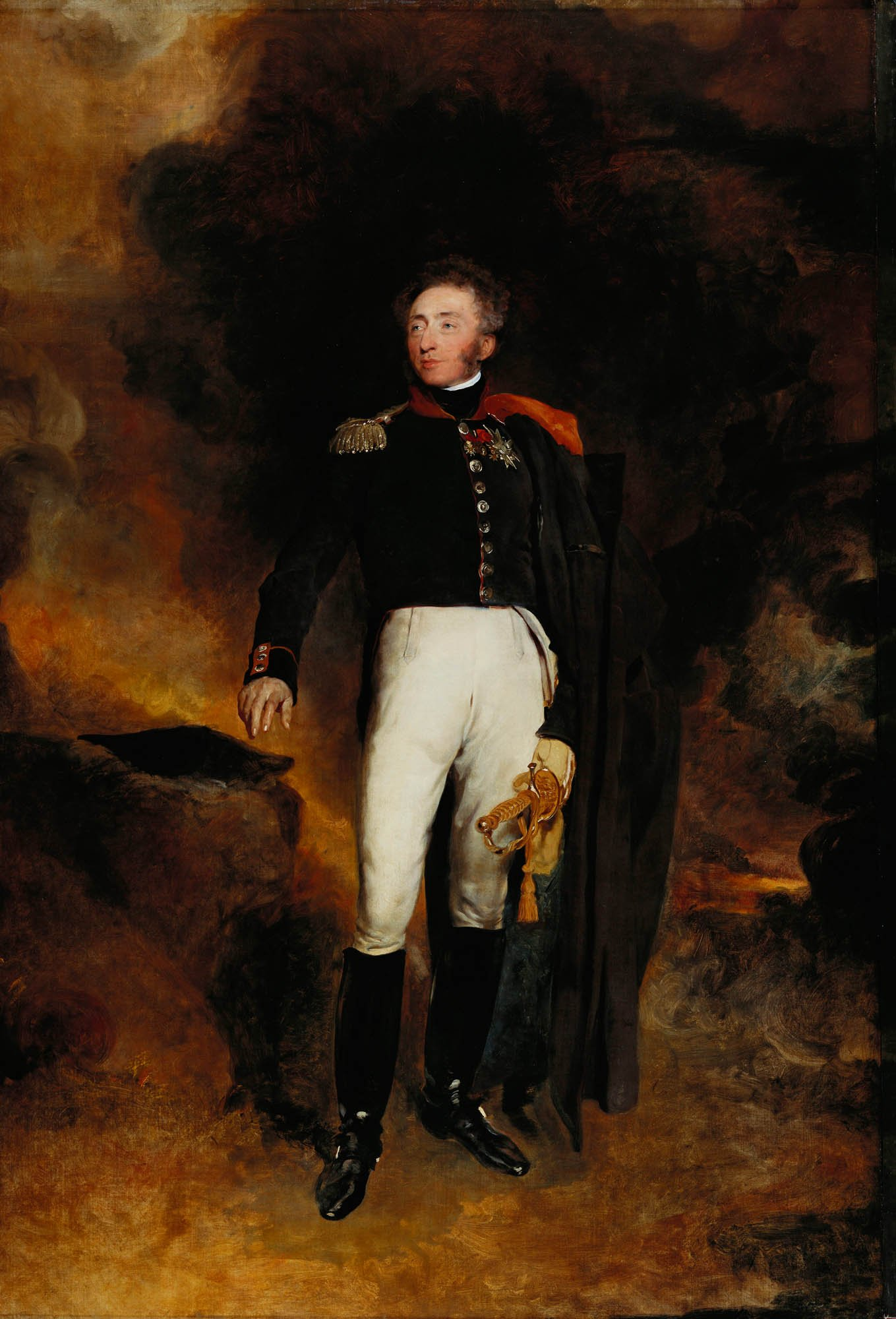
- Portrait of the Duke of Angoulême by Thomas Lawrence

King of France (disputed) as Louis XIX
- Tenure: 2 August 1830
- Predecessor: Charles X
- Successor: Henry V (not proclaimed); Louis Philippe I as King of the French

Legitimist pretender to the French throne
- Pretence: 6 November 1836 – 3 June 1844
- Predecessor: Charles X
- Successor: Henri, Count of Chambord
- Born: 6 August 1775; Palace of Versailles, Kingdom of France
- Died: 3 June 1844 (aged 68); Gorizia, Austrian Empire
- Burial: Kostanjevica Monastery, Nova Gorica, Slovenia
- Spouse: Marie Thérèse of France (m. 1799)
- Issue: stillborn child
- House: Bourbon
- Father: Charles X of France
- Mother: Maria Theresa of Savoy

Coat of arms of Louis Antoine as Duke of Angoulême.

Coat of arms of Louis Antoine as Dauphin.

Louis Antoine of France, Duke of Angoulême (6 August 1775 – 3 June 1844) was the elder son of Charles X of France and the last Dauphin of France from 1824 to 1830. He was also technically King of France for 20 minutes as Louis XIX after his father's abdication before abdicating himself in favor of his nephew, Henry V, making him have the shortest reign in history.

He was a petit-fils de France at birth, and was initially known as Louis Antoine d'Artois. After his father's accession to the throne, he became Dauphin de France, and his surname changed to de France, following the royal custom for princes with such rank.'

== Biography ==
=== Early life ===
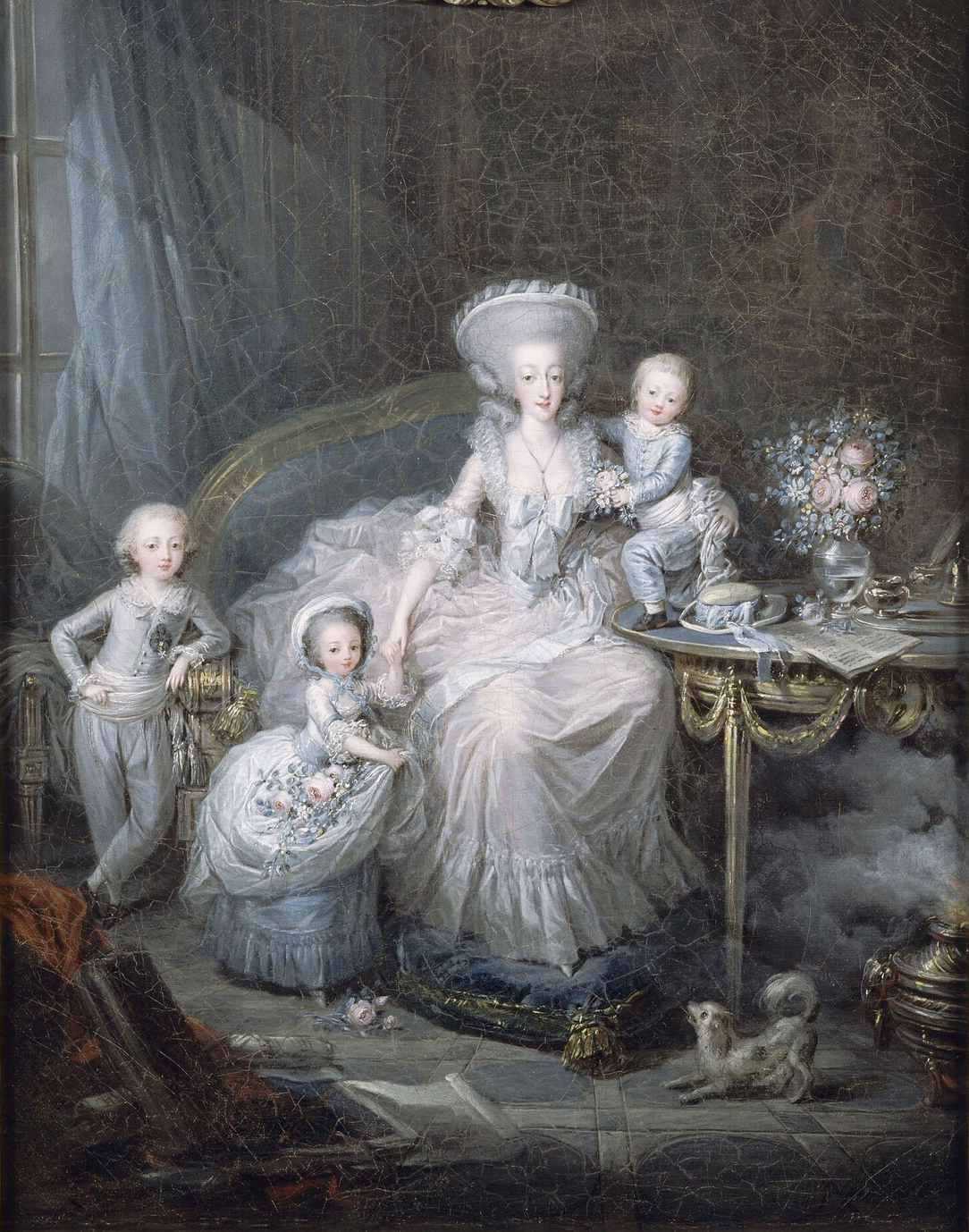
The young duke with his siblings and mother, the Countess of Artois (by Charles Le Clercq, c. 1780–1782)

Louis Antoine was born at the Palace of Versailles, as the eldest son of Charles Philippe, Count of Artois, the youngest brother of King Louis XVI. He was born one year after the death of his great-grandfather, King Louis XV, and 7 years after the death of his great-grandmother, Queen Marie Leszczyńska. His mother was Princess Maria Theresa of Savoy (known as Marie Thérèse in France), daughter of Victor Amadeus III of Sardinia and Maria Antonia Ferdinanda of Spain.

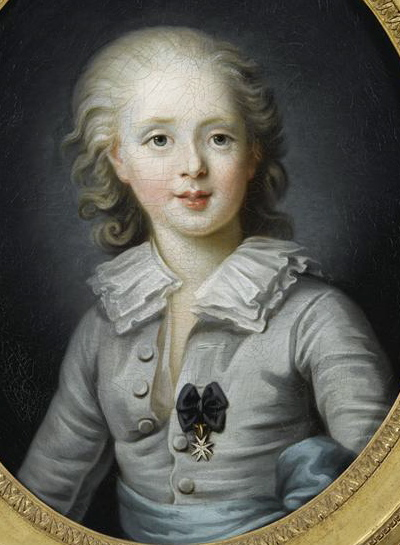
Louis-Antoine by Rosalie Filleul, c. 1781

From 1780 to 1789, Louis Antoine and his younger brother, Charles Ferdinand, Duke of Berry, were educated by their gouverneur Armand-Louis, Marquis of Sérent in the château de Beauregard, located 5 km (3.1 mi) away from Versailles. On the outbreak of the French Revolution in 1789, the two young princes followed their father into exile first to Turin, then the Holy Roman Empire, and finally Britain. In 1792, Louis Antoine joined the émigré army of his cousin, the Prince of Condé.

In June 1795, his uncle, the comte de Provence, proclaimed himself King Louis XVIII. Later that year, the 20-year-old Louis Antoine led an unsuccessful royalist uprising in the Vendée. In early 1797, he joined his brother and uncle in the German Duchy of Brunswick, hoping to join the Austrian Army. The defeat of Austria by France obliged them to flee, and they took refuge in Mittau, Courland, under the protection of Tsar Paul I of Russia.

There, on 10 June 1799, Louis Antoine married his first cousin, Marie Thérèse of France, the eldest child of Louis XVI and Marie Antoinette, and the only member of the immediate royal family to survive the French Revolution. Since her release from the Temple Prison in 1795, she had been living at the Austrian court. They had one child, who died at birth in 1813.

=== Military service ===
In April 1800, Louis Antoine took command of a regiment of cavalry in the Bavarian army and took part in the battle of Hohenlinden against the French, showing some ability.

In early 1801, Tsar Paul made peace with Napoleon Bonaparte, and the French court in exile fled to Warsaw, then controlled by Prussia. For the next ten years, Louis Antoine accompanied and advised his uncle, Louis XVIII. They returned to Russia when Alexander I became Tsar, but in mid-1807, the treaty between Napoleon and Alexander forced them to take refuge in Britain. There, at Hartwell House, King Louis reconstituted his court, and Louis-Antoine was granted an allowance of £300 a month. Twice (in 1807 and 1813) he attempted to return to Russia to join the fight against Napoleon, but was refused by the Tsar.

Louis Antoine remained in Britain until 1814 when he sailed to Bordeaux, which had declared for the King. His entry into the city on 12 March 1814 was regarded as the beginning of the Bourbon Restoration in France. From there, Louis Antoine fought in the war to bring about Napoleon's overthrow. He led an eponymous campaign in the south of France and inflicted a number of defeats on the armies of Napoleon, but when he was overrun, he was deserted by his generals and captured by imperial forces. He was later pardoned by Napoleon and was allowed to leave France via Spain.

=== Personal life ===
In mid-1812, according to their doctor's reports, noted by author and historian Susan Nagel, Louis-Antoine and Marie-Therese finally consummated their marriage. On December 19, Marie-Therese's 34th birthday, she confirmed to be pregnant after falling seriously ill the week of October 31-November 5, possibly showing symptoms of nausea from morning sickness. By the time Princess Charlotte of Wales noticed she was in high spirits, her doctor, Monsieur Lefebvre, confirmed to Francois Hue, "At this moment, I am tending to a woman who lives above me and who is pregnant for the first time after more than thirteen years of marriage." He announced to his wife in a letter that the Duke of Angouleme would become a father in June. Madame Hue recorded, “Monsieur Hue and Monsieur Lefebvre designate Madame the Duchess of Angouleme, announcing her pregnancy.” On February 15. Louise de Conde wrote to her father about her shock and astonishment concerning the Duchess's pregnancy. At least nine days prior, British newspapers recorded that Marie-Therese was severely indisposed and was advised by her doctors to "not attend the drawing room on Thursday."

In mid-May, “The Duke D'Angouleme, Baron De Rolli, and the Duke D'Artois, left London yesterday for the Continent. Prague is said to be their destination, where, according to report, a Congress of Princes is to be held.” Sometime between late February and June 1813, Marie-Therese suffered a severe, five-month miscarriage or gave birth to a stillborn child, almost certainly at Hartwell House. Had she delivered in May or June, she and Louis-Antoine would have almost certainly apart. She travelled to Bath with her uncle to recover, on both July 15 and August 7 of 1813, while residing at 70-71 or 72 Great Pulteney Street.

=== Flight to Britain and return ===
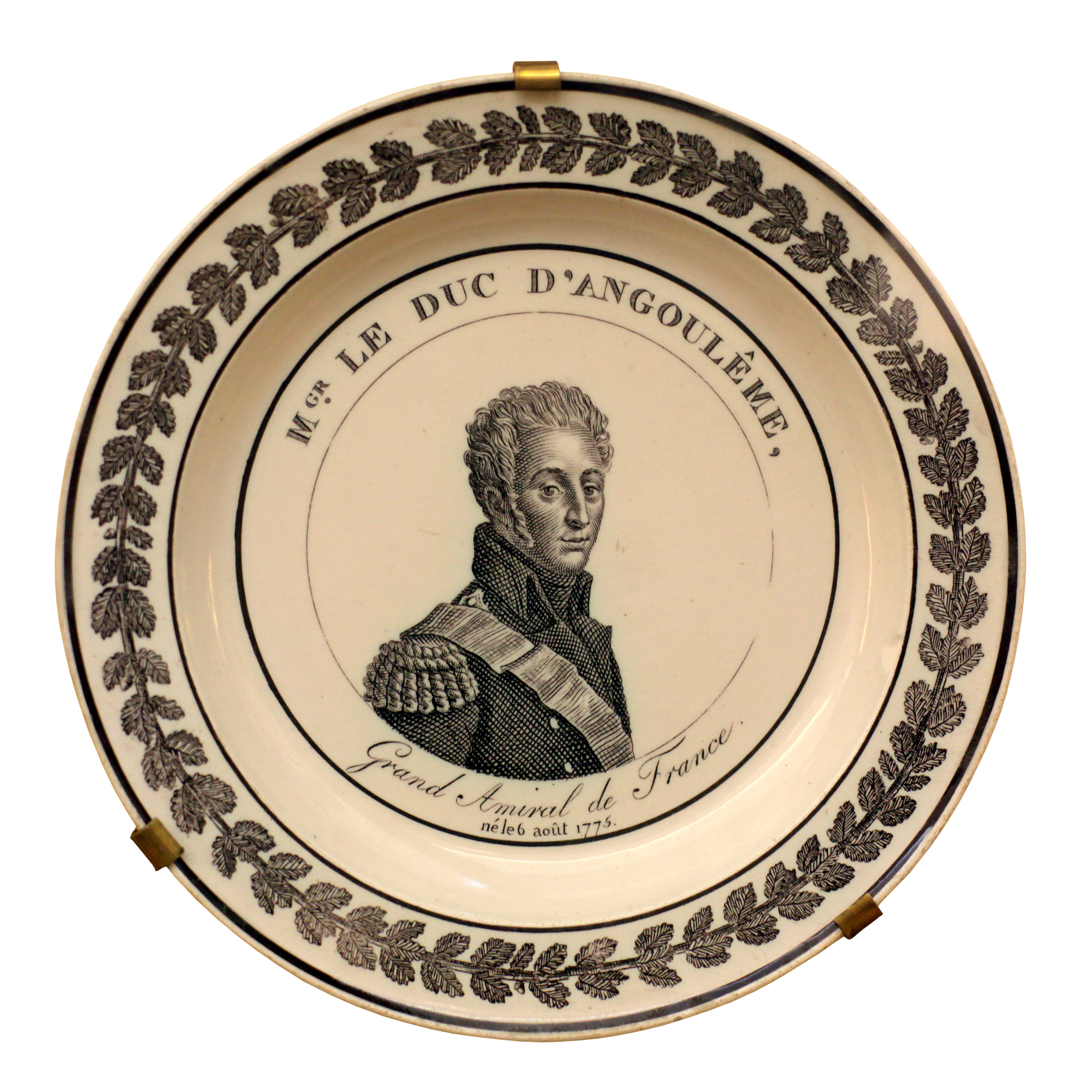
Faience plate celebrating the Duke of Angoulême as Admiral of France. On display at the Musée national de la Marine, Paris.

Louis Antoine was, as chief of the royalist army in the southern Rhône River valley was unable to prevent the return of Napoleon to Paris; however, unlike the rest of the French royals, he and his wife, in Bordeaux, stayed put after Napoleon retook power. After leading an insurrection he was captured then released, being granted safe passage to Britain through Spain during the "Hundred Days". He loyally served Louis XVIII after the final defeat of Napoleon at Waterloo. His younger brother was assassinated at the Paris Opera in February 1820.

In 1823, he commanded a French army sent into Spain to restore the Spanish King's absolute powers, known as the Hundred Thousand Sons of Saint Louis. He was victorious in the Battle of Trocadero, after which the reactionary power of King Ferdinand VII of Spain was firmly restored. For this achievement, he was offered the title of Prince of Trocadero.

Upon Louis XVIII's death in 1824, his father became King Charles X and Louis Antoine became Dauphin, heir apparent to the throne. He attended his father's coronation in Reims in May 1825.

=== July Revolution ===
In the July Revolution of 1830, masses of angry demonstrators demanded the abdication of Charles. He reluctantly signed the document of abdication on 2 August 1830. It is said that Louis Antoine, who relinquished his right to the throne, became king "Louis XIX" between his father's signature and his own, but in the abdication document he is only referred as "Louis Antoine". The document was signed in favour of his nephew Henri, Duke of Bordeaux. For the final time he left for exile, where he was known as the "count of Marnes".

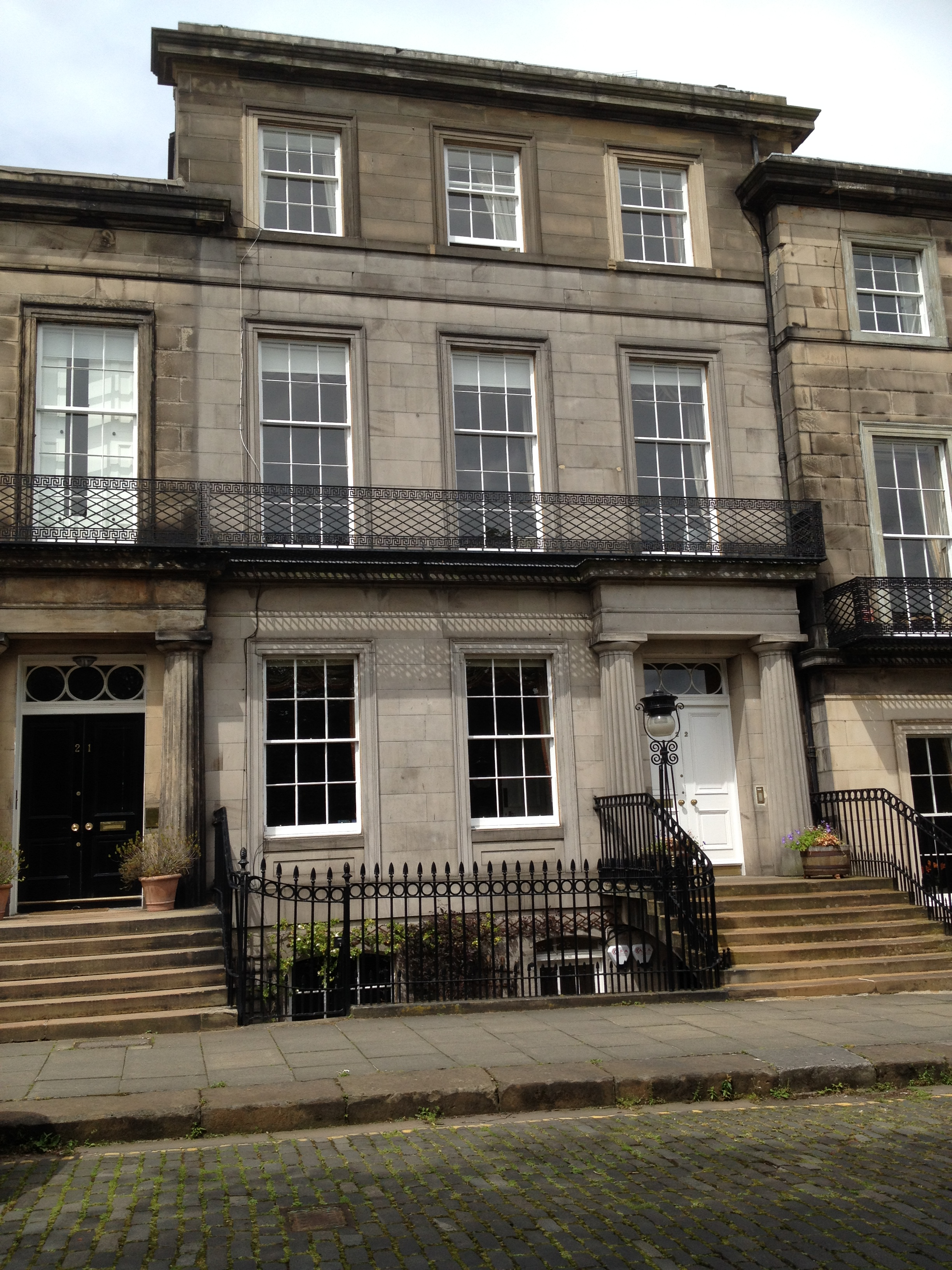
22 Regent Terrace, Edinburgh where he lived in exile following the July Revolution of 1830

Louis Antoine and his wife travelled to Edinburgh, Scotland, in November 1830 and took up residence in a house at 21 (now 22) Regent Terrace near Holyrood Palace where Charles X was staying.

Emperor Francis I of Austria offered the Prague Castle in Prague to the royal entourage in 1832, so Louis-Antoine and Charles X moved there. Francis I, however, died in 1835, and his successor Ferdinand I told the French royal family that he needed the palace for his coronation in the summer of 1836. The exiled French kings and their entourage therefore left and eventually arrived at the palace of Grafenberg in Görz, Austria on 21 October 1836.

Many legitimists did not recognise the abdications as valid, and recognised Charles X as king until his death in 1836, with Louis Antoine succeeding him as Louis XIX. Louis Antoine died in Görz on 3 June 1844, aged 68. He was buried in his father Charles X's crypt in the church of the Franciscan monastery of Kostanjevica in Nova Gorica, Slovenia. Upon his death, his nephew the Duke of Bordeaux became head of the Bourbon royal family of France under the regnal name Henry V, although he used the title of Count of Chambord in exile.

He is identified by the Guinness World Records as the shortest-reigning monarch, reigning for less than 20 minutes during the July Revolution, but this is not backed up by historical evidence. He never reigned over the country, but after his father's death in 1836, he was the legitimist pretender as Louis XIX.

== In fiction and film ==
The newborn Duke of Angoulême is portrayed by an uncredited child actor in a brief scene in the movie Marie Antoinette (2006), directed by Sofia Coppola. This scene contains an error, as it mistakenly names his parents as the Count and Countess of Provence, who never had children.

== See also ==
- List of shortest-reigning monarchs
- Duc d'Angoulême's porcelain factory

== Footnotes ==
Louis Antoine, Duke of Angoulême House of Bourbon Cadet branch of the Capetian dynasty Born: 6 August 1775 Died: 3 June 1844
French royalty
Vacant Title last held by Louis (XVII)	Dauphin of France; 16 September 1824 – 2 August 1830	Title abolished
Titles in pretence
Preceded by Charles X	— TITULAR — King of France; Legitimist pretender 6 November 1836 – 3 June 1844; Reason for succession failure: July Revolution	Succeeded by Henri V
Loss of title	— TITULAR — Dauphin of France; 2 August 1830 – 6 November 1836	Vacant Title next held by Philippe (VIII) or Charles (XI)
