= Eulalie (disambiguation) =

"Eulalie" (or "Eulalie - A Song") is an 1845 poem by Edgar Allan Poe.

Eulalie may also refer to:

== People with the given name ==
- Eulalie Minfred Banks (1895–1999), American writer, illustrator and muralist
- Marie Rose Durocher (1811–1849), a Canadian religious leader, born Eulalie Mélanie Durocher
- Eulalie Dawson (1883–1907), honorary surgeon at Adelaide Hospital
- Eulalie James (1940–2011), Trinidad and Tobago politician
- Eulalie Jensen (1884–1952), actress
- Eulalie de Mandéville (1774–1848) American placée and businesswoman.
- Eulalie Morin (1765–1837), French painter
- Eulalie Nibizi (born 1960), Burundian trade unionist and human rights activist
- Eulalie Piccard, Russian-Swiss novelist, translator and teacher
- Eulalie de Senancour (1791–1876), French novelist and journalist
- Mary Eulalie Fee Shannon (1824–1855), American poet who used the pen name, "Eulalie"
- Eulalie Spence (1894–1981), American playwright and teacher from the British West Indies
- Eulalie Spicer (1906–1997), British lawyer

== Fiction ==
- A character in the French folk tale Jean, the Soldier, and Eulalie, the Devil's Daughter
- Eulalie Mackecknie Shinn, a character in The Music Man
- Eulalie Soeurs, a fictional lingerie emporium owned by Roderick Spode in works by P. G. Wodehouse
- Eulalie, a fictional lingerie emporium in Seventy-Two Virgins, a novel by Boris Johnson

== Other ==
- Eulalie (restaurant), New York City, US

== See also ==
- Eulalia (disambiguation)
- Sainte-Eulalie (disambiguation)
