= Eulalia =

Eulalia is a feminine given name of Greek origin (Ancient Greek: Εὐλαλία, romanized: Eulalía), meaning "well-spoken." It may refer to:

== People ==
- Saint Eulalia (disambiguation), the name of two venerated Spanish martyr saints, with similar hagiographies of possibly same historical origin, with several locales in Roman Catholic countries named after them:
  - Saint Eulalia of Mérida (c. 292–304)
  - Saint Eulalia of Barcelona (c. 290–303) whose relics are assumed to be in the Barcelona Cathedral, La Catedral de la Santa Creu i Santa Eulàlia
- Eulalia Guzmán (1890–1985) a pioneering feminist and educator and nationalist thinker in post-revolutionary Mexico
- Eulalia (abbess of Shaftesbury), an abbess of Shaftesbury Abbey in Dorset (England)
- Eulalia Ares de Vildoza (1809–1884), Argentinian coup leader
- Eulalia Bernard (1935–2021), Costa Rican writer, poet, and politician
- Eulalia de Liáns, pseudonym of Spanish writer Fanny Garrido (1846–1917)
- Eulalia Jiménez Méndez (born 1891), Mexican revolutionary
- Eulalia Kadmina (1853–1881), Imperial Russian opera singer
- Eulàlia Lledó (born 1952), Spanish academic
- Infanta Eulalia of Spain (1864–1958)
- Princess Eulalia d'Orléans Bourbon (born 2006), Spanish aristocrat
- Princess Eulalia of Thurn and Taxis (1908–1993)
- Eulalia Ramos (1795 – 7 April 1817) woman involved in the Venezuelan war of independence

== Places ==
- Santa Eulalia del Rio, the Spanish name for the town of Santa Eulària des Riu.
- Sainte-Eulalie, Quebec
- Sainte-Eulalie, Gironde in the Aquitaine region of France
- Sainte-Eulalie, Ardèche in the Rhône-Alpes region of France
- Eulalia Township, Potter County, Pennsylvania, USA
- Eulalia, Norman Park, a heritage-listed house in Brisbane, Queensland, Australia

== Science ==
- 495 Eulalia, an asteroid
- Eulalia (annelid), a genus of polychaete worms
- Eulalia, a synonym for the genus Odontomyia of flies
- Eulalia (plant), a genus of grasses named after Eulalie Delile
- Eulalia grass, the common name for the cultivated Miscanthus sinensis (syn. Eulalia japonica), a grass species
- Adelpha eulalia, a species of nymphalid butterfly

== Literature ==
- The Sequence of Saint Eulalia, a 9th century Old French text.
- Eulalia Bon, a character in Absalom, Absalom! by William Faulkner
- A principal character in The Amours of Sainfroid and Eulalia
- Eulalia!, the 19th novel in the Redwall series by Brian Jacques
- Eulalie, the ladies' lingerie business run by itinerant dictator Roderick Spode in the works of P. G. Wodehouse
- "Eulalie," a poem by Edgar Allan Poe
- Eulalie Boyles, a character in Marjorie Kinnan Rawlings' novel The Yearling.
- Eulalia, a character in Leticia Landon's poem "A History of the Lyre"

== See also ==
- Eulalie (disambiguation)
