= Vildoza =

Vildoza is a surname. Notable people with the surname include:

- Eulalia Ares de Vildoza (1809–1884), Argentine coup leader
- Jorge Vildoza (1930–2005), Argentine military officer and criminal
- José Vildoza (born 1996), Argentine basketball player
- José Domingo Vildoza (1799 –1870), Argentine governor
- Leandro Vildoza (born 1994), Argentine basketball player
- Luca Vildoza (born 1995), Argentine basketball player

== See also ==
- Ángel Vildozo (born 1981), Argentine former footballer
