= Infante Álvaro, Duke of Galliera =

Spanish infante (1910–1997)

Infante Álvaro
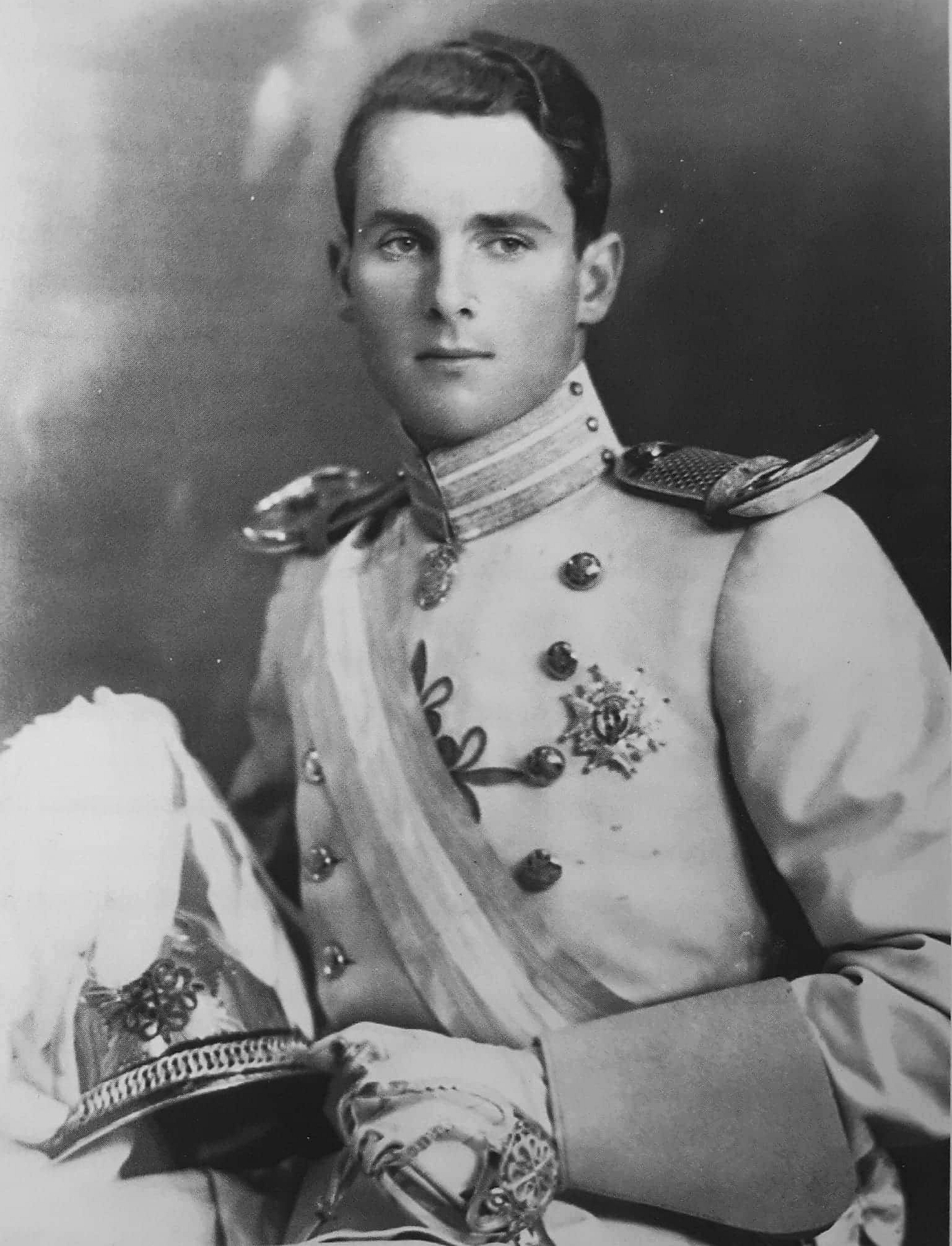
- Wearing the uniform of the Order of Calatrava, c. 1930

Duke of Galliera
- Tenure: 14 July 1937 – 22 August 1997
- Predecessor: Infante Alfonso
- Successor: Don Alfonso
- Born: 20 April 1910; Coburg, Duchy of Saxe-Coburg and Gotha, German Empire
- Died: 22 August 1997 (aged 87); Monte Carlo, Monaco
- Burial: Capuchin Monastery of Sanlúcar de Barrameda
- Spouse: Carla Parodi-Delfino (m. 1937)
- Issue Detail: Doña Gerarda de Orléans-Borbón y Parodi Delfino; Don Alonso de Orléans-Borbón y Parodi Delfino; Doña Beatriz de Orléans-Borbón y Parodi Delfino; Don Alvaro Jaime de Orléans-Borbón y Parodi Delfino
Names
- Álvaro Antonio Fernando Carlos Felipe de Orleans y Sajonia-Coburgo-Gotha
- House: Orléans-Galliera
- Father: Infante Alfonso, Duke of Galliera
- Mother: Princess Beatrice of Saxe-Coburg and Gotha

Infante Álvaro, Duke of Galliera (20 April 1910 – 22 August 1997) was a Spanish infante who held the Italian title of Duke of Galliera from 1937 to 1997.

== Life and family ==
He was born at Coburg in Saxe-Coburg and Gotha, German Empire, as the first son of Infante Alfonso and Princess Beatrice of Saxe-Coburg and Gotha. His father was the elder son of Infante Antonio, Duke of Galliera and Infanta Eulalia of Spain, while his mother was the youngest daughter of Alfred, Duke of Saxe-Coburg and Gotha and Grand Duchess Maria Alexandrovna of Russia.

He succeeded to the title of Duke of Galliera on 14 July 1937. He died in 1997 at the age of 87, making him the last surviving child of Infante Alfonso and Princess Beatrice, as well the last surviving grandchild of Prince Alfred and Grand Duchess Maria Alexandrovna.

As his elder son Alonso died in 1975 at the age of 34, his grandson Alfonso inherited the Dukedom of Galliera in 1997.

== Marriage and descendants ==
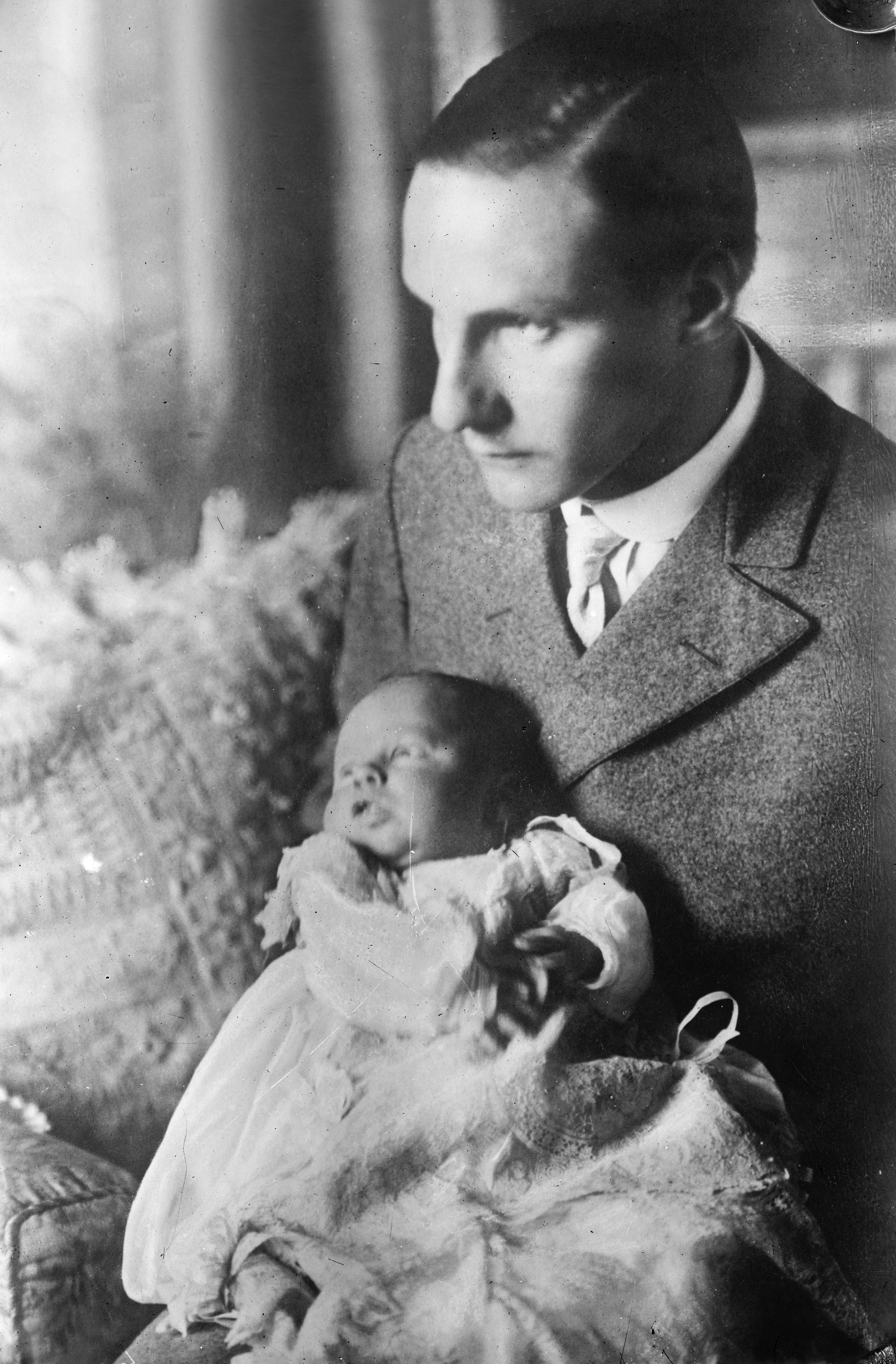
Pictured with his father in 1910

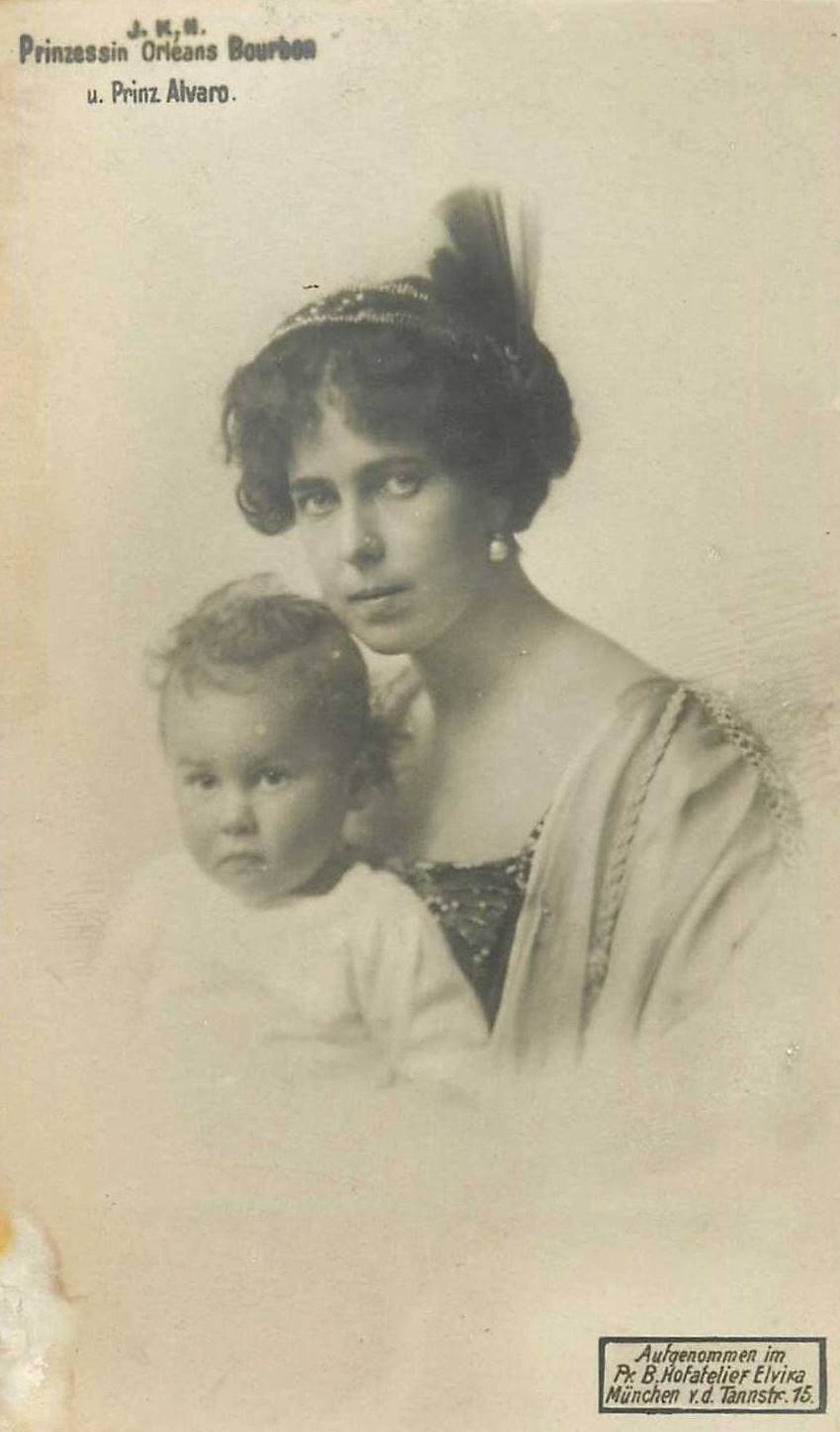
Álvaro with his mother, c. 1911

He married Carla Parodi-Delfino (13 December 1909 in Milan, Italy – 27 July 2000 in Sanlúcar, Spain) on 10 July 1937 in Rome, Italy. She was the eldest daughter of Leopoldo Parodi-Delfino, an Italian senator and business magnate, and his wife Lucie Hennij, daughter of the Dutch governor of Java.

They had four children:

- Doña Gerarda de Orléans-Borbón y Parodi-Delfino (born 25 August 1939 in Rome, Italy), married Harry Freeman Saint (born 13 February 1941 in New York City, United States) on 26 July 1963, had two children, and divorced in 1977. She married secondly Ignacio Romero y Solís-Beaumont, 6th Marqués de Marchelina in 1990, no issue. Her children with Harry Freeman Saint are:
  - Carla d'Orléans-Borbón Saint (born 22 May 1967 in New York City, New York, United States), married John Stephen Lilly (born 20 March 1965 in Chicago, Illinois, United States) on 19 September 1992 in Riverdale, New York, no issue, divorced in 2001. She married secondly Nicolás de Haro y Fernández de Córdoba (born 13 October 1965 in Seville, Spain) on 23 June 2001 in Spain, and had three children:
    - Nicolás de Haro y Saint (born 1 January 2001 in Seville, Spain)
    - Sofia de Haro y Saint (born 19 May 2004 in Seville)
    - Mateo de Haro y Saint (born 10 May 2007 in Seville)
  - Marc Saint Orleans-Borbon
- Don Alonso de Orléans-Borbón y Parodi-Delfino (born 23 August 1941 in Rome, Italy, died 6 September 1975 in Houston, Texas, United States), married Doña Emilia Ferrara Pignatelli, dei Principi di Strongoli (born 6 April 1940 in Naples, Italy, died 22 December 1999 in Naples) on 12 January 1966 in Naples, and had two sons:
  - Don Alfonso de Orléans-Borbón, 7th Duke of de Galliera (born 2 January 1968 in Santa Cruz de Tenerife, Canary Islands), married Véronique Goeders on 28 March 1994. After seven years of marriage, they divorced in 2001. They had one son:
    - Don Alonso Juan de Orleans-Borbón y Goeders (born 15 July 1994 in Paris, France)
  - Don Alvaro de Orléans-Borbón y Ferrara-Pignatelli (born 4 October 1969 in Santa Cruz de Tenerife, Canary Islands), married Alice Acosta on 6 April 2007, and had two children:
    - Don Aiden de Orléans-Borbón y Acosta (born 19 June 2009)
    - Doña Amelia de Orléans-Borbón y Acosta (born 2017)
- Doña Beatriz de Orléans-Borbón y Parodi-Delfino (born 27 April 1943 in Seville, Spain), married Tommaso dei Conti Farini (16 September 1938 in Turin, Italy - 13 January 2018 in Rome, Italy) on 25 April 1964 in Rome, Italy, and had two children:
  - Gerardo Alfonso dei Conti Farini (born 23 November 1967 in Bologna, Italy), married Délia Mittempergher in 2007 and had two daughters:
    - Luisa Farini (born 2008)
    - Alessandra Farini (born 2009)
  - Elena Gioia dei Conti Farini (born 27 October 1969 in Rome, Italy), married Joaquin de Haro y Fernández de Córdova (born 23 June 1971 in Seville, Spain) on 19 June 1999 in Sanlúcar de Barrameda, Spain, and had two children:
    - Claudia de Haro y Farini (born 28 December 2000 in Madrid, Spain)
    - Tomás de Haro y Farini (born 12 September 2003 in Madrid)
- Don Álvaro Jaime de Orléans-Borbón y Parodi-Delfino (born 1 March 1947 in Rome, Italy), married Giovanna San Martino d'Agliè dei Marchesi di San Germano (niece of Queen Paola of Belgium, born 10 April 1945 in Campiglione, Italy) on 24 May 1974 in Campiglione, had issue, and divorced. He married second, Antonella Rendina (born 1969) on 28 December 2007. He has three children with his first wife and a daughter with his second wife:
  - Pilar de Orléans-Borbón y San Martino d'Agliè (born 27 May 1975 in Rome, Italy), married Nicholas Henderson-Stewart (born 1974) in June 2006, and has six children:
    - Felix Henderson-Stewart (born 2007)
    - Louis Henderson-Stewart (born 2008)
    - Daria Henderson-Stewart (born 2009 in Brussels, Belgium)
    - Xenia Henderson-Stewart (born 10 February 2011 in Brussels)
    - James Henderson-Stewart (born 2012)
    - Pedro Henderson-Stewart (born 2014)
  - Andrés de Orléans-Borbón y San Martino d'Agliè (born 7 July 1976 in Rome, Italy), married Anne-Laure van Exter on 30 January 2009 in London, England, with four children:
    - Ines de Orleáns-Borbón y van Exter (born 30 January 2010 in London)
    - Eugenia de Orleáns-Borbón y van Exter (born 7 March 2011 in London)
    - Álvaro de Orléans-Borbón y van Exter
    - Sofía de Orléans-Borbón y van Exter
  - Alois de Orléans-Borbón y San Martino d'Agliè (born 24 March 1979 in Rome, Italy), married Guadalupe Solis Jabón (born 17 February 1978 in Ciudad Real, Spain) on 28 June 2008 in Asti, Italy, and had one son:
    - Alonso de Orléans y Solís (born 23 March 2010 in Madrid)
  - Doña Eulalia de Orléans-Borbón y Rendina (born 2006, her godfather is King Juan Carlos I of Spain)

== Coat of arms ==
Heraldry of the Duke of Galliera

Arms of Infante Álvaro, Duke of Galliera

== Notes and sources ==
Infante Álvaro, Duke of Galliera House of Orléans Cadet branch of the House of Bourbon Born: 20 April 1910 Died: 22 August 1997
Italian nobility
Preceded by Infante Alfonso	Duke of Galliera; 14 July 1937 – 2 June 1946	Succeeded by Republic declared
Titles in pretence
Loss of title Republic declared	— TITULAR — Duke of Galliera; 2 June 1946 – 22 August 1997; Reason for succession failure: Italian nobility titles abolished	Succeeded by Alfonso de Orleans-Borbón
