= Eylo (name) =

Eylo was the first count of Álava around 868.

Eylo, Eilo, Ello, Elo or Ailo was also a women's name in 11th- and 12th-century Spain. Its origin is unknown, but it has been proposed that it is a hypocoristic of Eulalia, that it is a short form of Eloísa (Latin Aloysia, the feminin form of Louis) or that it is the same as the Gothic name Egilo/Egilona, spelled to reflect contemporary pronunciation.

It may refer to:

- Eylo Alfonso (fl. 1075–1109), daughter of Count Alfonso Muñoz and wife of Count Pedro Ansúrez
- Eylo Álvarez (fl. 1114–1148), daughter of Álvar Fáñez and wife of Rodrigo Fernández de Castro
