= Saint Eulalia =

Saint Eulalia (in Spanish, Santa Eulalia; in Catalan, Santa Eulàlia or Santa Eulària; in French, Sainte-Eulalie) may refer to:

== Art ==
- Saint Eulalia (Waterhouse painting), a painting by John William Waterhouse (1885)

== People ==
- Eulalia of Barcelona (290–303), saint interred in Barcelona, Spain
- Eulalia of Mérida (290–304), saint interred in Mérida, Spain

== Places ==
=== France ===
- Sainte-Eulalie (disambiguation)—various places in France (and one in Quebec) use this name

=== Guatemala ===
- Santa Eulalia, Huehuetenango, a municipality in the department of Huehuetenango

=== Mexico ===
- Santa Eulalia, Chihuahua, a town in the state of Chihuahua

=== Peru ===
- Santa Eulalia District, of Huarochirí Province
- Rio Santa Eulalia, a river in Lima province that merges with the Rímac River

=== Portugal ===
- Silveiros e Rio Covo (Santa Eulália), a parish in Barcelos
- Santa Eulália (Arouca), a parish in Arouca, Portugal
- Santa Eulália de Fórnos, a parish in Freixo de Espada à Cinta

=== Spain ===
- Santa Eulalia de Oscos, a municipality in Asturias
- Santa Eulària des Riu, a town and municipality in Ibiza
- Saint Eulalia of Cabranes, capital of Cabranes in Asturias
- Santa Eulalia del Campo, a municipality in Aragon
- Palau de Santa Eulàlia, a municipality in Catalonia
- Santa Eulàlia (Barcelona Metro), a station of Barcelona Metro
- Santa Eulàlia (L'Hospitalet de Llobregat), a neighbourhood of the municipality of L'Hospitalet de Llobregat in Catalonia

== See also ==
- Sequence of Saint Eulalia, an early Old French text
- Eulalia (disambiguation)
