= Eulalia d'Orléans Bourbon =

Spanish aristocrat

Princess Eulalia
- Born: 2006 (age 19–20); Rome, Italy
- House: Orléans-Galliera
- Father: Prince Alvaro d'Orléans Bourbon
- Mother: Antonella Redina
- Education: University of St Andrews

Princess Eulalia d'Orléans Bourbon (Spanish: Doña Eulalia de Orléans-Borbón y Rendina; born 2006) is an Italian-born Spanish aristocrat and relative of the Spanish royal family. She is a granddaughter of Infante Álvaro, Duke of Galliera and the goddaughter of Juan Carlos I.

== Early life and family ==
Princess Eulalia was born in Rome in 2006 to Prince Alvaro of Orléans-Bourbon, a member of the House of Orléans-Galliera, and the Italian writer Antonella Redina. She is a granddaughter of Infante Álvaro, Duke of Galliera and a descendent of Queen Isabella II. Her great-great-grandparents were Grand Duchess Maria Alexandrovna of Russia and Prince Alfred, Duke of Saxe-Coburg and Gotha.

She has three half-siblings from her father's first marriage to Giovanna San Martino D'Agliè, a niece of former Queen Paola of Belgium. She is a relative of the Spanish royal family and the former French royal family and a direct descendant of King Louis XIII.

She was baptized a Catholic ceremony in Sanlúcar de Barrameda in 2008 with King Juan Carlos I serving as her godfather. She grew up in Monaco.

== Adult life ==
Princess Eulalia is studying financial economics at the University of St Andrews in Scotland.

On 26 May 2024, she attended a gala dinner for the F1 Grand Prix in Monaco.

In November 2025, she was presented to society during le Bal des débutantes at the Hôtel Shangri-La in Paris. She was escorted by Albert Windsor, son of Lord Nicholas Windsor and grandson of Prince Edward, Duke of Kent. She was dressed in a gown by Tony Ward and was loaned the Fleur-de-Lys diamond tiara, made by Moritz Hübner in 1912, by V Muse Jewelry for the occasion. Princess Eulalia debuted alongside three of her cousins, Gabrielle Janssens de Balkany, Princess Isabelle d’Orléans, and Almudena Dailly d’Orléans. Her society debut was heavily anticipated by French monarchists with the French newspaper Le Figaro reporting that she was "among the most keenly awaited debutantes at this unmissable high society event."
