= Château de Bagnolet, Paris =

Château in Île-de-France, France

Coordinates: 48°52′07″N 2°25′04″E

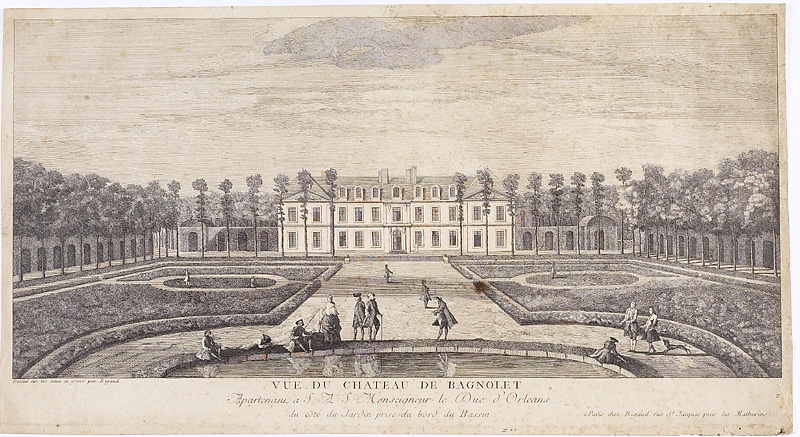
- Bagnolet, Engraving by Jacques Rigaud.
- Interactive map of the Château de Bagnolet, Paris area

General information
- Type: Château
- Architectural style: French Baroque
- Construction started: 17th century
- Completed: 1738

The Château de Bagnolet was a château situated in the Paris suburb of Bagnolet, France, 5.2 km from the center of the capital. The property was part of the biens de la Maison d'Orléans, private property of the House of Orléans from 1719 till 1769. It was demolished in the 19th century.

== History ==
The original château was constructed in the 17th century by Marie de Bourbon, Countess of Soissons and Princess of Carignano after her marriage to Prince Thomas Francis of Savoy. At her death in 1692, aged 86, the property was acquired by the fermier général, François Le Juge.

François Le Juge owned the property until 12 March 1719 when Philippe d'Orléans, (Regent of France during the minority of Louis XV), acquired it.

The Régent gave the château de Bagnolet to his wife, Françoise Marie de Bourbon, a Légitimée de France, daughter of Louis XIV and his mistress, Madame de Montespan. The Palais-Royal in Paris was the Duke of Orléans' official residence.

The Duchess of Orléans made Bagnolet her favourite residence, it becoming her property as a gift from her husband. She had the architect Claude Desgots (nephew of André Le Nôtre) add two large wings to the building; she also had the park redesigned.

In the park she commissioned the construction of follies; small ornamental pavilions. There were at least four such constructions: the Wood House, the Gazebo, the Hermitage and the Orangerie. Only the Hermitage exists today. There was a formal Jardin à la française and a larger English garden.

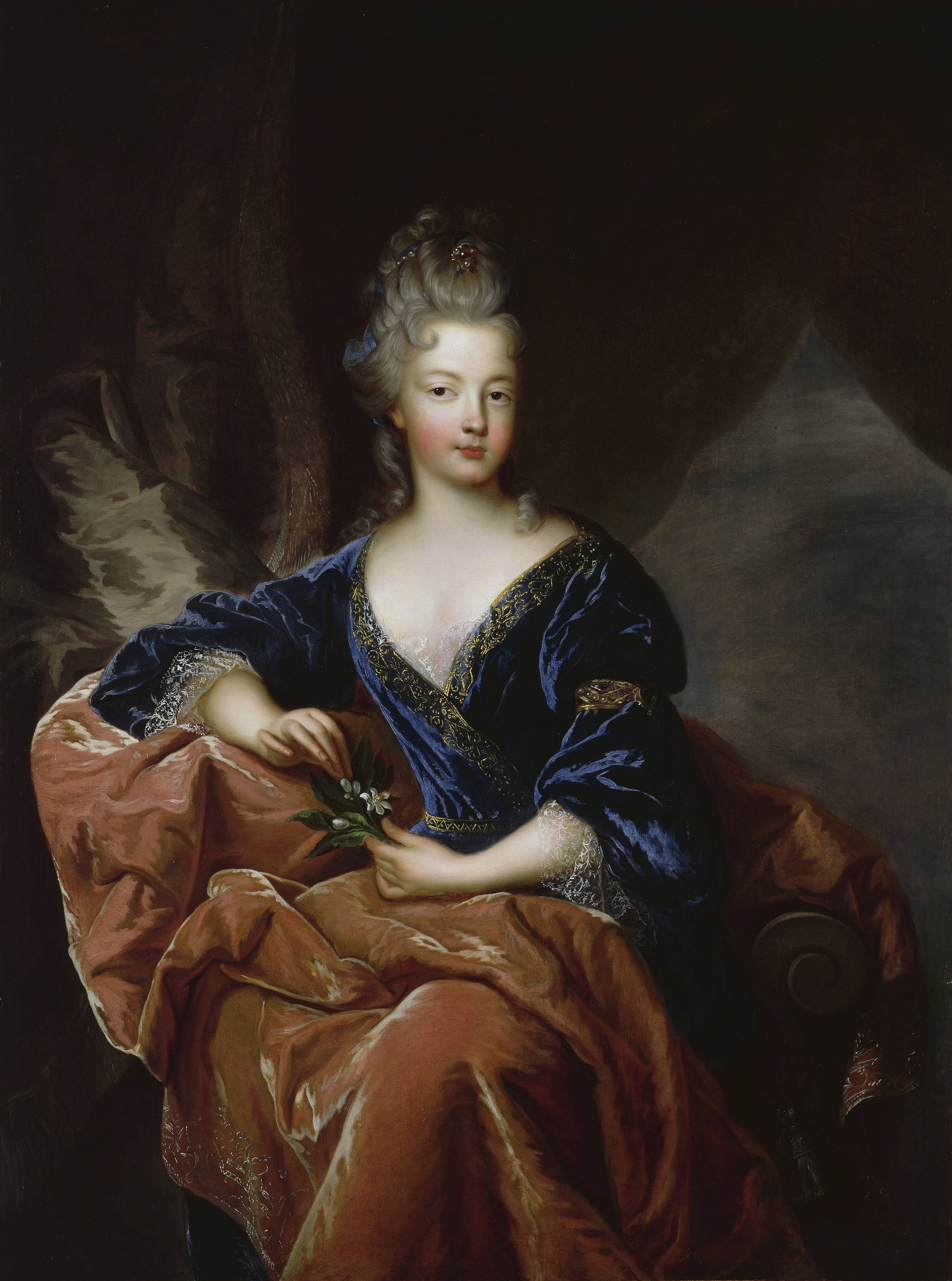
The Duchess of Orléans, by François de Troy.

In 1734, the Dowager Duchess of Orléans let her daughter Philippine Élisabeth d'Orléans stay at the château; the young woman had once been engaged to the future Charles III of Spain; the couple was much in love, but the marriage never took place. Philippine Élisabeth was sent back to France unmarried and ignored; she died at Bagnolet of smallpox at the age of 19.

At the death of the Duchess on 1 February 1749, her son, Louis, Duke of Orléans, inherited the Bagnolet estate. He never lived there, having retired to the Abbaye Sainte-Geneviève de Paris in 1740 after the death of his wife in 1726.

By 1759, the estate covered 200 acres (0.81 km^{2}). The château remained the property of the House of Orléans until 1769. The only son of Louis d'Orléans became the Duke of Orléans upon his father's death in 1752. He sold the property and later acquired the larger Château du Raincy from the marquis du Livry.

The château was demolished in the 19th century and the land was sold off. Most of what made up the estate is now a residential estate.

=== The Hermitage ===
The Hermitage is the only structure from the old estate to exist today; it can be found at 148 rue de Bagnolet, in the 20th arrondissement of Paris. The building was begun in the summer of 1720 for the Duchess of Orléans by one Serin. The interior paintings were carried out by Jean Valade and included frescoes by Antoine Le Grand.

When completed, it was covered with a flat roof with a railing in the Italian style. It was later the property of Baron of Batz who used it as a petite maison; during the Revolution of 1789, the building was used for secret meetings discussing the secret escape of Louis XVI on the way to the scaffold; Batz's mistress was later executed for her involvement in the meetings.

In 1820, the house belonged to François Pomerel, who had the façade engraved with his name; his son-in-law sold it to the Assistance publique in 1887.

It was later incorporated to the Debrousse hospital for children.

== Bibliography ==
- Pérouse de Montclos, Jean-Marie: Guide du patrimoine: Paris, Hachette Tourisme, Paris, 1994, ISBN 2010168127,

ISBN 978-2010168123
