= Sophie Piccard =

Russian-Swiss mathematician

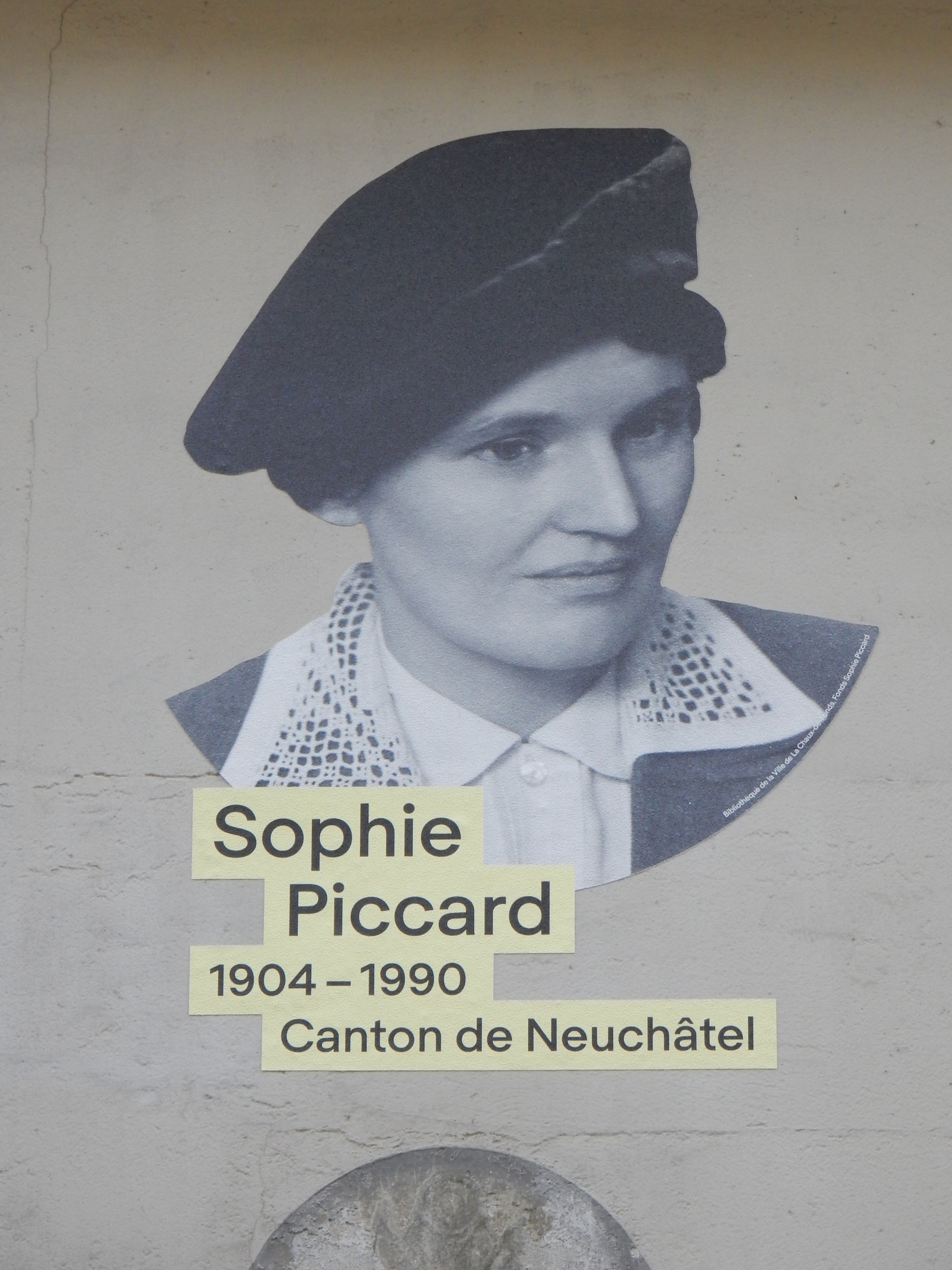
- Born: 27 September 1904; Saint Petersburg, Russia
- Died: 6 January 1990 (aged 85); Fribourg, Switzerland
- Occupation: Professor

Academic background
- Education: University of Lausanne

Academic work
- Discipline: Mathematics
- Sub-discipline: Set theory Group theory Linear algebra History of mathematics
- Institutions: University of Neuchâtel

Sophie Piccard (1904–1990) was a Russian-Swiss mathematician who became the first female full professor (professor ordinarius) in Switzerland. Her research concerned set theory, group theory, linear algebra, and the history of mathematics.

== Early life and education ==
Piccard was born on September 27, 1904, in Saint Petersburg, with a French Huguenot mother and a Swiss father. She earned a diploma in Smolensk in 1925, where her father, Eugène-Ferdinand Piccard, was a university professor and her mother a language teacher at the lycée. Soon afterwards she moved to Switzerland with her parents, escaping the unrest in Russia that her mother, Eulalie Piccard, would become known for writing about. Sophie Piccard's Russian degree was worthless in Switzerland, and she earned another from the University of Lausanne in 1927, going on to complete a doctorate there in 1929 under the supervision of Dmitry Mirimanoff.

== Career and later life ==
She worked outside of mathematics until 1936, when she began teaching part-time at the University of Neuchâtel as an assistant to Rudolf Gaberel. Gaberel died in 1938 and she inherited his position, becoming a professor extraordinarius (associate professor). She was promoted to professor ordinarius in 1943, as the chair of higher geometry and probability theory at Neuchâtel.

Piccard died on January 6, 1990, in Fribourg.

== Contributions ==
Piccard was an invited speaker at the International Congress of Mathematicians in 1932 and again in 1936.

In 1939 she published the book Sur les ensembles de distances des ensembles de points d'un espace Euclidien (Mémoires de L’Université de Neuchâtel 13, Paris, France: Libraire Gauthier-Villars and Cie., 1939). Its subject was the sets of distances that a collection of points in a Euclidean space might determine. This book included early research on Golomb rulers, finite sets of integer points in a one-dimensional space with the property that their distances are all distinct. She published a theorem claiming that every two Golomb rulers with the same distance set must be congruent to each other; this turned out to be false for certain sets of six points, but true otherwise.
