= Alfonso de Orléans-Borbón, Duke of Galliera =

Spanish aristocrat

Don Alfonso
- Arms of the Duke of Galliera

Duke of Galliera
- Tenure: 22 August 1997 – present
- Predecessor: Infante Álvaro
- Born: 2 January 1968 (age 58); Santa Cruz de Tenerife, Spain
- Spouse: Véronique Goeders (m. 1994; div. 2001)
- Issue: Don Alonso de Orleans-Borbón y Goeders
Names
- Alfonso de Orleans-Borbón y Ferrara-Pignatelli
- House: Orléans-Galliera
- Father: Don Alonso de Orleans-Borbón y Parodi-Delfino
- Mother: Donna Emilia Ferrara-Pignatelli

Alfonso de Orléans-Borbón y Ferrara-Pignatelli, 7th Duke of Galliera (born 2 January 1968 in Santa Cruz de Tenerife, Spain), is a Spanish aristocrat, the founder and president of the European motorsport team Racing Engineering and a professional racing driver.

Alfonso is the elder son of Don Alonso de Orléans-Borbón y Parodi-Delfino and Donna Emilia Ferrara-Pignatelli. He inherited the title Duke of Galliera in 1997 following the death of his grandfather, Infante Álvaro.

== Professional racing career ==
A passionate car enthusiast and driver, he returned to racing in the early 1990s. In 1994, he made his debut at the prestigious 24 Hours of Le Mans, finishing 4th in the GT2 class. Over the subsequent years he competed internationally in endurance racing with manufacturers including Ferrari and Porsche.

== Racing Engineering ==
In 1999, Alfonso de Orléans-Borbón founded Racing Engineering, a European motorsport team. The team enjoyed some success: six consecutive Spanish Formula 3 team titles (2001–2006), a championship in the 2002 World Series by Nissan, and, with Fabio Leimer, winning the GP2 Series driver's championship title in 2013. Over the years, Racing Engineering has helped to develop drivers who progressed to Formula 1 and other top-tier international racing categories.

Alfonso de Orléans-Borbón, Duke of Galliera House of Orléans-Galliera Cadet branch of the House of Orléans Born: 2 January 1968
Titles in pretence
Preceded by Infante Álvaro	— TITULAR — Duke of Galliera; 22 August 1997 – present Reason for succession failure: Italian nobility titles abolished	Incumbent; Heir: Don Alonso Juan de Orleans-Borbón y Goeders
French royalty
Preceded by Infante Álvaro	Line of succession to the French throne (Legitimist); 120th position	Succeeded by Don Alonso Juan de Orleans-Borbón y Goeders
