= Eulalie Spicer =

- Born: 20 April 1906; Beckenham, England
- Died: 29 March 1997 (aged 90); Lambeth, London, England
- Occupation: lawyer
- Known for: helping to establish legal aid in the UK

Eulalie Spicer (20 April 1906 – 29 March 1997) was a British lawyer and legal aid administrator. She was a leading divorce lawyer and liked to be called "Miss Spencer" or "EES". She wore her hair very short in an Eton crop, wore a suit, used a cigarette holder, travelled around on a scooter and enjoyed shooting revolvers.

== Early life and education ==
Eulalie Evan Spicer was born in Beckenham on 20 April 1906. Her parents were Elsie Mary (née Williams) and Charles Evan Spicer. Her father dealt in wholesale stationary. Spicer was educated at St Helen’s School, Northwood, and graduated from King’s College London with a BA in philosophy. She was awarded a PhD in philosophy from University College London for her thesis on Aristotle's conception of the soul. She then took a law degree and qualified as a solicitor in June 1938. At that time, only an average of only fifteen women qualified each year.

== Career ==
Spicer practised law from premises at 5–6 Clement's Inn, London, close to the law courts. In 1942 she joined the Law Society's staff as a solicitor.

She was the supervising solicitor of the services divorce department, newly established to cope with the increase of marriage breakdowns during the Second World War. Women solicitors were now in demand as many male solicitors were drafted into the military. There were several solicitors but she was the leading light, travelling across the country to brief barristers on hundreds of cases. She became “one of the most prominent divorce lawyers of her day”. In 1945 she had 100 people assisting her and seven solicitors.

== Legal Aid ==
A Labour government came to power in 1945 and they decided to establish legal aid. The Legal Aid and Advice Act 1949 received Royal assent on 30 July and came into force in a limited way in October 1950. Suddenly there was one system for claiming legal aid in England and Wales. The assistance was means tested but freely available to people of "small or moderate means".

She became responsible for approving the 25,000 applications that arrived in 1966, her final year in the London area. When she retired from that position in 1966, and set up in private practice, her previous job was split into two so that two people could do it. She commanded a great deal of respect from those who dealt with her. She worked at that and liked to be called "Miss Spencer" or "EES" by her staff.

== Personal life ==
Spicer wore her hair very short, wore a suit, used a cigarette holder and travelled around on a scooter. One of her hobbies was shooting a revolver. In retirement she became secretary of the legal aid committee of the general synod of the Church of England and a lay reader. Age seventy, she took the degree Bachelor of Divinity at King's College, London.

Spicer died in St Thomas' Hospital in Lambeth. She was unmarried and had no children. She left over £1.2m.
