= Sainte-Eulalie =

Sainte-Eulalie is the name or part of the name of several communes in France:

- Sainte-Eulalie, Ardèche, in the Ardèche department
- Sainte-Eulalie, Aude, in the Aude department
- Sainte-Eulalie, Cantal, in the Cantal department
- Sainte-Eulalie, Gironde, in the Gironde department
- Sainte-Eulalie, Limousin
- Sainte-Eulalie, former commune of the Lot department, now part of Espagnac-Sainte-Eulalie
- Sainte-Eulalie, Lozère, in the Lozère department
- Sainte-Eulalie, former commune of the Tarn-et-Garonne department, now part of Lapenche

== As part of a name ==
- Sainte-Eulalie-d'Ans, in the Dordogne department
- Sainte-Eulalie-de-Cernon, in the Aveyron department
- Sainte-Eulalie-d'Eymet, in the Dordogne department
- Sainte-Eulalie-d'Olt, in the Aveyron department
- Sainte-Eulalie-en-Born, in the Landes department
- Sainte-Eulalie-en-Royans, in the Drôme department

== Outside France ==
- Sainte-Eulalie, Quebec

== See also ==
- Saint Eulalia (disambiguation)
