= Eulalie Piccard =

Eulalie Piccard (Saint Petersburg, 26 October 1879 - Neuchâtel, June 1957), sometimes called Eulalie Piccard Guée, was a Russian-Swiss novelist, translator and teacher, writing in French. She was one of the first literary writers to explore the transformation of Russia into the Soviet Union and the police state that was constructed there under Joseph Stalin. While her work does not approach the literary force of Alexander Solzhenitsyn or Varlam Shalamov and didn't reach major public attention, it represented an early sustained effort to expose legal and penal developments in the Soviet Union that, in the 1930s and 1940s, were little discussed outside Russian emigrant circles. When show trials and labour camps were referred to in newspapers and books at the time, the tone was generally sensational and made little attempt to connect them to Soviet political culture or to everyday life.

Piccard, who was born in the late 1870s, made a teaching career in Russia, while marrying a Swiss who had come to Russia. She taught at a lyceum until fleeing with her family to Western Europe in 1925. From the twenties to the 1960s, she was active as a writer and translator (from Russian into French) and in 1929 began putting out her cycle of novels Épisodes de la Grande Tragédie Russe ("Episodes from the Great Tragedy of Russia") comprising:

- 1929 Mort aux Bourgeois! ("Death to the Bourgeoisie!")
- 1934 L'Université rouge ("The red University")
- 1935 Les Koulaks ("The Kulaks")
- 1938 Les Nuiseurs ("The Wreckers")
- 1946 La Fin d'une Révolution ("The End of a Revolution")

In 1962 she published Lettres de Moscou ("Letters from Moscow")

She was the mother of the mathematician Sophie Piccard. Thanks to her daughter's work and advocacy, Eulalie Piccard's papers are preserved in the Swiss National Library.
