= Eulalia Jiménez Méndez =

Mexican revolutionary (1891–?)

- Born: 1891; Celaya, Guanajuato, Mexico
- Died: Unknown
- Movement: Mexican Revolution

Eulalia Jiménez Méndez (Celaya, Guanajuato, Mexico, 1891) was a Maderista Mexican revolutionary, a member of the Hijas de Cuauhtémoc Women's Anti-Reelectionist Club which sought to combat the regime of Porfirio Díaz.

== Activities ==
Eulalia was the daughter of another revolutionary María de los Ángeles Viuda de Méndez. She participated in a massive march towards the Chamber of Deputies demanding the resignation of Porfirio Díaz. In 1910, she was arrested for her revolutionary activities, and her home was ransacked.

With Francisco I. Madero in power, she continued her political work together with her mother and in 1911 she and her mother, along with other women such as Dolores Jiménez y Muro, Elisa Acuña and Josefa Arjona, participated in the Tacubaya plot. As soon as Victoriano Huerta carried out the coup d'état, both had to go into exile in Havana (Cuba) from where they returned at the end of 1913. During 1914, she was commissioned to buy ammunition for the constitutionalist cause in Texas (United States). In March of that same year she joined the constitutionalist medical services in the campaign and collaborated in the task of making clothing for the revolutionary army.
