= Eulàlia Lledó =

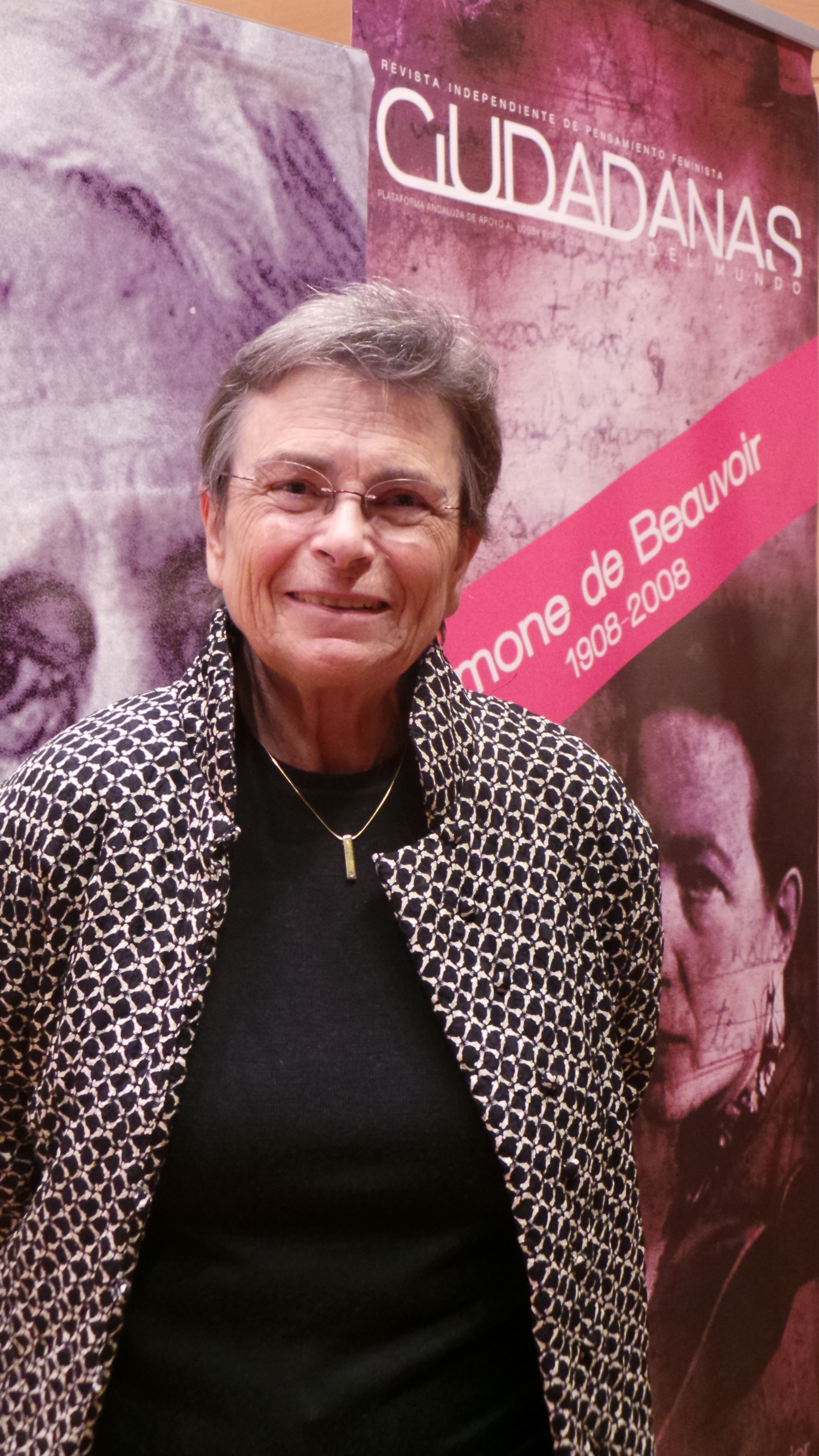
- Born: Eulàlia Lledó i Cunill; 1952 (age 73–74); Barcelona, Spain
- Education: University of Barcelona
- Occupation: Academic
- Awards: Creu de Sant Jordi (2008)
- Website: www.eulalialledo.cat

Eulàlia Lledó i Cunill (born 1952) is a doctor in Romance Philology from the University of Barcelona, Spain, a specialist in sexism and language research. She is the author of the first guide in Spain on the treatment of gender violence and media, published in 1999 by the Andalusian Women's Institute and Radio y Televisión de Andalucía. She has received several awards for her work, including the Creu de Sant Jordi in 2008. Likewise, she contributes to HuffPost.

== Biography ==
Eulàlia Lledó has been a secondary school teacher in Barcelona for years, and collaborates with several universities and gender studies networks, including the Genet Network of the Spanish National Research Council (CSIC). She is a specialist in investigating sexist and androcentric biases in literature and language.

She has prepared numerous guides and manuals on the subject, including Cómo tratar bien a los malos tratos. Manual de Estilo para los Medios de Comunicación (How to Treat Mistreatment Properly: Style Manual for the Media) in 1999, which was the first print guide in Spain with recommendations for the treatment of media and gender violence. She has also written numerous books on coeducation, articles, and literary reviews, especially on women's writings.

She has been part of the Nombra group, Advisory Commission of the Women's Institute of the Government of Spain, since its foundation in 1994.

She has collaborated on the revision of the Diccionari General de la Llengua Catalana by the Institut d'Estudis Catalans and on the revision of the Diccionario de la lengua española by the Royal Spanish Academy.

In March 2018 she participated in the encounter "La fórmula de la igualdad" (The Formula of Equality) at the RTVE Corporation with an intervention on the insensitive biases of sexism.

She is a contributor to the Spanish edition of HuffPost.

== Awards and honours ==
- In 2008, Lledó was awarded the Creu de Sant Jordi for her "interest in avoiding sexist and androcentric uses of language."
- In 2016, she was awarded the Non-Sexist Communication Prize for her "quality in research and training in language and communication with a gender perspective", granted by the Association of Catalan Women Journalists (ADPC).
- in 2016, she was awarded the Maria Antònia Ferrer i Bosch Distinction[5], granted by the University of Rovira Virgili Equality Observatory.
- In 2018, she received the 14th Isonomia Award against Gender-Based Violence, granted by the Isonomia Foundation.
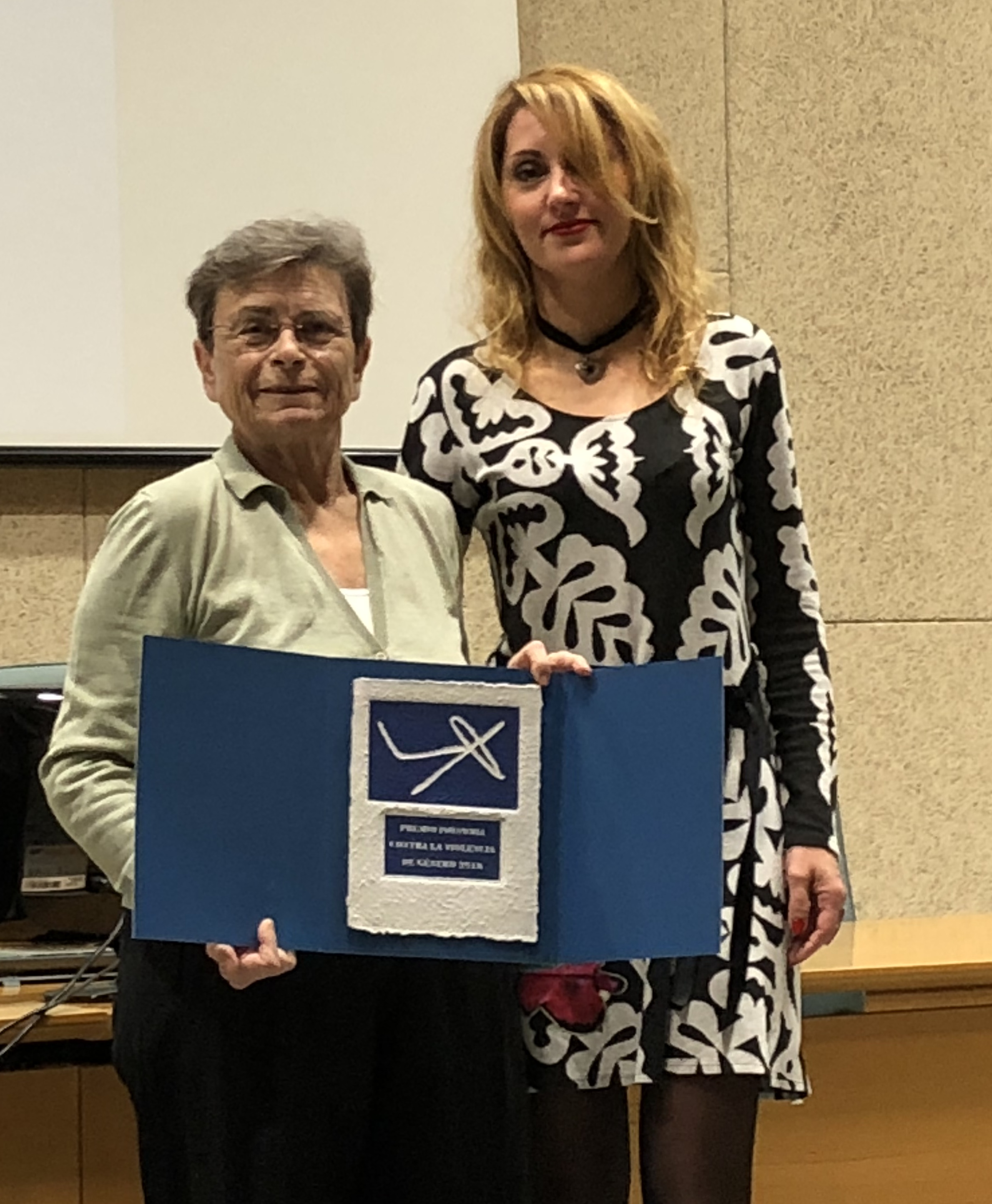
  Eulàlia Lledó receives the 2018 Isonomia Award together with Pilar Senent, Vice-Rector of Jaume I University.

== Works ==
=== Books about language ===
- El sexisme i l'androcentrisme en la llengua: anàlisi i propostes de canvi (1992)
- Cómo tratar bien a los malos tratos. Manual de Estilo para los Medios de Comunicación (1999)
- De mujeres y diccionarios. Evolución de lo femenino en la 22ª edición del DRAE (together with María Ángeles Calero and Esther Forgas; 2004)
- L'espai per a les dones als diccionaris (2005)
- Las profesiones de la A a la Z (2006)
- De llengua, diferència i context (2007)
- De lengua, diferencia y contexto (2010)
- Manual de llengua per visibilitzar la presència femenina (2011)
- Cambio lingüístico y prensa. Problemas, recursos y perspectivas (2013)

=== Books about literature ===
- Doce escritoras y una guía bibliográfica (together with Mercè Otero; 1994)
- Dotze escriptores i una guia bibliogràfica (together with Mercè Otero; 1994)
- Dona finestrera (1997)
- Dona balconera. A les penes, llibreries (2007)
- Sor Juana Inés de la Cruz. La hiperbólica fineza (2008)

=== Language guides ===
- Esports, dones i llengua. 1. Estatuts: un model (2007)
- Esports, dones i llengua. 2. Normatives de competicion, reglamentacions i documents administratius (2007)
- Esports, dones i llengua. 3. Manuals d'aprenentatge (2007)
- Esports, dones i llengua. 4. Reglament General de Règim Interior (2007)
- Esports, dones i llengua. 5. Reglament d'ús d'una instal·lació esportiva (2008)
- Breus receptes per visibilitzar les dones en l'esport (2008)
- Breus receptes per visibilitzar les dones en l'educació (2008)
- Hablamos de leyes (together with Charo Guerrero; 2008)
- Guía de lenguaje para el ámbito educativo (2008)
- Guía de lenguaje para el ámbito de la salud (2009)
- Guía de lenguaje para el ámbito del deporte (2009)
- Guía de lenguaje para el ámbito de la cultura (2010)
- Guía de lenguaje para el ámbito de la empresa y el empleo (2011)

=== Books about coeducation ===
- Com elles (together with Mercè Miralles, Mercè Otero, and Lola Ribelles; 1996)
- Elles i la seva obra (together with Mercè Miralles, Mercè Otero, and Lola Ribelles; 1996)
- Escriure com elles (together with Mercè Miralles, Mercè Otero, and Lola Ribelles; 1996)
- Parlar com elles (together with Mercè Miralles, Mercè Otero, and Lola Ribelles; 1996)
- Escriptores del món. Guia de recursos i orientacions didàctiques per a la literatura. Cassandra (2001)
- Coeducación. Día Internacional para la eliminación de la violencia contra las mujeres (together with Begoña González; 2004)
- Escritoras del mundo. Unidades didácticas (2010)

=== Other writings ===
- La línia de flotació. Dietari intermitent (2009)
- El fil dels dies (2009-2013) (2013)
