= Eulalia Ares de Vildoza =

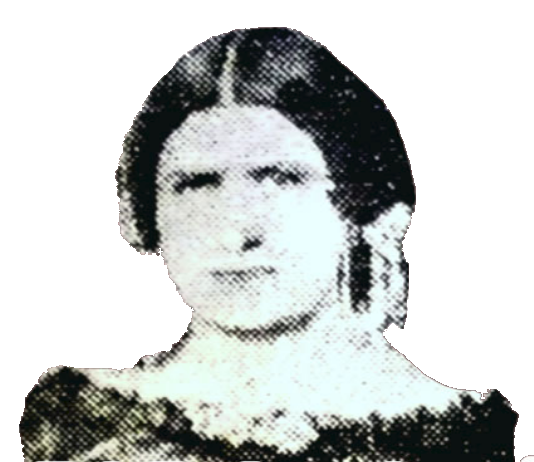
Eulalia Ares de Vildoza

Eulalia Ares de Vildoza (c. 1809–1884), was an Argentine coup leader who deposed the governor of the Catamarca Province in 1862, during the War between the Argentine Confederation and the state of Buenos Aires.

She married the military officer and landowner José Domingo Vildoza (1799–1870) in 1827. Vildoza was a friend of governor Ramón Rosa Correa; Correa was deposed and replaced in 1862 by a rival politician named Moises Omill. Correa and his supporters - including José Domingo Valdoza - fled, and Omill was officially entered into office as governor.

Allegedly tired of waiting for Correa and his troops to take action, Eulalia Ares lead an insurrection. At the head of a group of women, who were armed and dressed as men, and followed behind by various men who supported the cause, she struck the governor's headquarters. She managed to take over the provincial government building, depose the province governor and take control of the province.

For a day, she was governor of the province while she organized a quick election to choose someone to act as new interim governor. A few days later her husband returned, and Correa resumed his governorship.
