= House of Orléans =

French noble family, a cadet branch of the House of Bourbon

House of Orléans Bourbon-Orléans
- Capetian royal family
- Arms of the House of Orléans
- Parent house: Bourbon
- Country: France; Brazil (Note: The House of Orléans-Braganza has never reigned over Brazil, as the monarchy was abolished in Brazil in 1889.)
- Founded: 10 May 1661; 365 years ago
- Founder: Philippe I, Duke of Orléans
- Current head: Jean d'Orléans, Count of Paris Heads of cadet branches: Alfonso de Orléans-Borbón, Duke of Galliera; Bertrand of Orléans-Braganza; Pedro of Orléans-Braganza and Petrópolis
- Final ruler: Louis Philippe I
- Titles: List: King of the French; Queen of Portugal; Prince of the Blood of France; Infante of Spain; Dauphin of Auvergne; Prince of Joinville; Duke of Orléans; Duke of Chartres; Duke of Montpensier; Duke of Angoulême; Duke of Vendôme; Duke of Aumale; Duke of Châtellerault; Duke of Galliera; Count of Paris; Count of Évreux; Count of Eu; Count of La Marche; Count of Clermont (extinct)
- Deposition: 24 February 1848; 178 years ago
- Cadet branches: Orléans-Braganza; Orléans-Galliera
- Website: comtedeparis.com

The House of Orléans (French: Maison d'Orléans), sometimes called the House of Bourbon-Orléans (French: Maison de Bourbon-Orléans) to distinguish it, is the fourth holder of a surname previously used by several branches of the Royal House of France, all descended in the legitimate male line from the dynasty's founder, Hugh Capet. The house was founded by Philippe I, Duke of Orléans, younger son of Louis XIII and younger brother of Louis XIV, the "Sun King".

From 1709 until the French Revolution, the Orléans dukes were next in the order of succession to the French throne after members of the senior branch of the House of Bourbon, descended from Louis XIV. Although Louis XIV's direct descendants retained the throne, his brother Philippe's descendants flourished until the end of the French monarchy. The Orléanists held the French throne from 1830 to 1848 and are still pretenders to the French throne today.

The House of Orléans has a cadet branch in the House of Orléans-Braganza, founded with the marriage between Isabel of Braganza, Princess Imperial of Brazil, and Prince Gaston of Orléans, Count of Eu. Although never reigning, the House of Orléans-Braganza has claimed the Brazilian throne since 1921.

== History ==
=== Background ===
It became a tradition during France's ancien régime for the Duchy of Orléans to be granted as an appanage to a younger (usually the second surviving) son of the king. While each of the Orléans branches thus descended from a junior prince, they were always among the king's nearest relations in the male line, sometimes aspiring to the throne itself, and sometimes succeeding. Since they had contemporaneous living descendants, there were two Bourbon-Orléans branches at court during the reign of King Louis XIV. The elder of these branches consisted of Prince Gaston, Duke of Anjou, younger son of King Henry IV, and the four daughters of his two marriages.

Prince Gaston became the Duke of Orléans in 1626, and held that title until his death in 1660. Upon the death of Gaston, the appanage of the Duchy of Orléans reverted to the Crown. His nephew, Louis XIV, then gave Gaston's appanages to his younger brother Prince Philippe, who became Duke of Orléans. At court, Gaston was known as Le Grand Monsieur ("The Big Milord"), and Philippe was called Le Petit Monsieur ("The Little Milord") while both princes were alive.

=== Creation ===
Philippe and his second wife, the famous court writer Elizabeth Charlotte of the Palatinate, founded the modern House of Bourbon-Orléans. Before then, Philippe had been styled as the Duke of Anjou, like Prince Gaston. Besides receiving the appanage of Orléans, he also received the duchies of Valois and Chartres: Duke of Chartres became the courtesy title by which the heirs apparent of the Dukes of Orléans were known during their fathers' lifetimes. Until the birth of the king's son, the Dauphin Louis, the Duke of Orléans was the heir presumptive to the crown. He was to maintain a high position at court till his death in 1701.

Their surviving son, Philippe II served as the regent of France for the young Louis XV. As a fils de France, Philippe's surname was de France. Upon his death, his son inherited the Orléans dukedom, but as a petit-fils de France. His surname d'Orléans (used also by his descendants) was taken from his father's main title. The first two dukes, as son and patrilineal grandson, respectively, of a French king, were entitled to be addressed as Royal Highness. But Philippe I was primarily known as Monsieur, the style reserved at the French court for the king's eldest brother.

Philippe II was succeeded as duke by his only legitimate son, Louis d'Orléans, who was entitled to the style of Serene Highness as a prince du sang. After 1709, the heads of the Orléans branch of the House of Bourbon ranked as the premier princes du sang – this meant that the dukes could be addressed as Monsieur le Prince (a style they did not, however, use). More importantly, should there be no heir to the Crown of France in the king's immediate family, then the Orléans family would ascend by right the throne.

=== Prince du sang ===
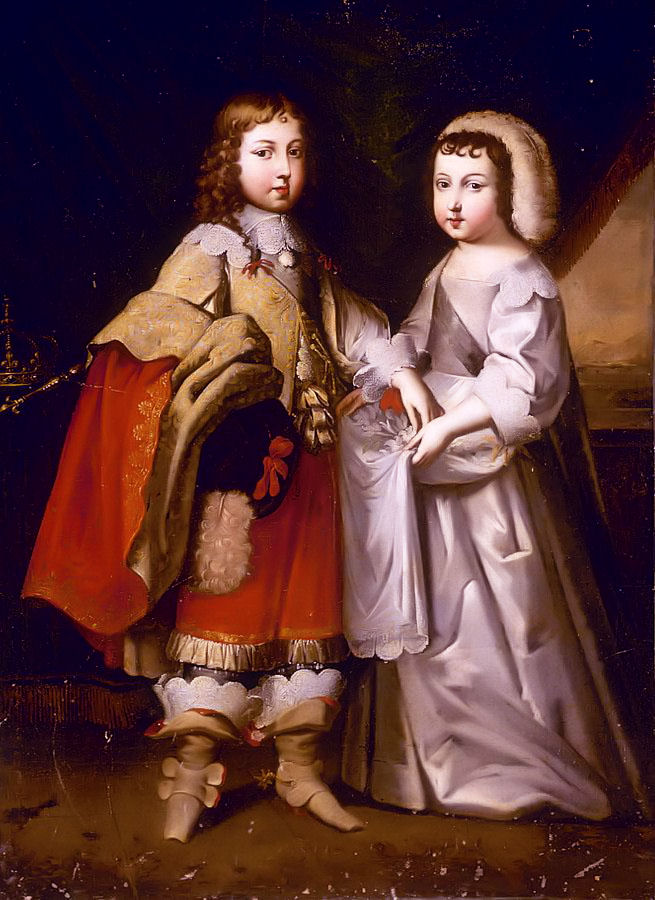
Louis XIV and his younger brother Le Petit Monsieur

In 1709, the 5th prince de Condé died. He was the premier prince du sang and head of the House of Bourbon-Condé. As a result of this death, the title of premier prince passed to the House of Orléans, as they were closer in blood to the throne of France. But since the two senior males of that line held higher rank as, respectively, fils de France and petit-fils de France, they did not make use of the title and had no need of its attached prerogative; a household and retinue maintained at the expense of the Crown.

The Orléans household was already large, as it held the staff of Philippe II d'Orléans and of his wife, as well as the staff of his widowed mother, the dowager Duchess. This combined household, though not fully functional until 1723, contained almost 250 members including officers, courtiers, footmen, gardeners, and even barbers.

=== The Regency ===
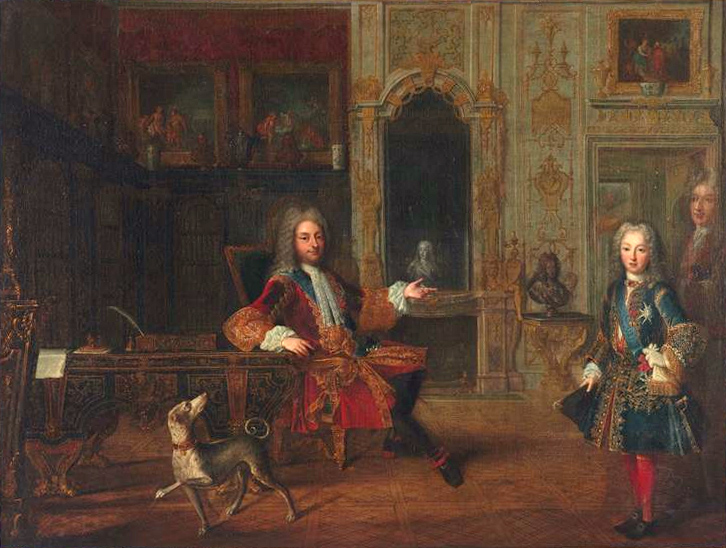
Philippe II d'Orléans with his Protégé, Louis XV

On the death of Louis XIV in September 1715, the new king, Louis XV, was only five years old. The country was then governed by the new king's older relative Philippe II d'Orléans as the regent of France. This period in French history is known as the Regency (La Régence), and gave the House of Orléans the pre-eminent position and political role in France during the king's minority. The regent ruled France from his family residence in Paris, the Palais-Royal. He installed the young Louis XV in the Palais du Louvre which was opposite the Palais-Royal.

In January 1723 Louis XV gained his majority and began to govern the country on his own. The young king moved the court back to Versailles and in December, Philippe II died and his son, Louis d'Orléans succeeded him as 3rd duke and, more importantly, as France's heir presumptive. Nonetheless, since his rank by birth (as a great-grandson of a French king) was prince du sang, that of premier prince du sang constituted a higher style, of which he and his descendants henceforth made use.

=== Under Louis XV ===
Louis d'Orléans was in several ways his father's opposite, being retiring by nature and extremely devout. Although still in his twenties when widowed, he did not remarry after his wife's death, and is not known to have ever taken a mistress. He died in the Monastery of St. Geneviève in Paris.

His son, Louis Philippe I, Duke of Orléans, was the fourth of his line to hold that title. After having a distinguished military career, he decided to live quietly with his mistress (later, his morganatic wife), the marquise de Montesson, at the Château de Sainte-Assise.

=== Louis XVI ===
Louis Philippe I d'Orléans and his wife Louise Henriette de Bourbon had two children: the fifth duke, Louis Philippe II d'Orléans, known to history as Philippe Egalité, and Bathilde d'Orléans. As the Duke of Chartres, Louis Philippe II married one of his cousins, Louise Marie Adélaïde de Bourbon. She was the sole heiress of the House of Bourbon-Penthièvre, which had accumulated vast wealth bestowed, despite their bar sinister, on the princes légitimés by their father, Louis XIV. The Duchess of Chartres had a dowry of six million livres, equivalent to £39,422,712 in 2025, and an annual allowance of over 500,000 livres, equivalent to £3,285,173 in 2025. Upon the death of her father she inherited the remainder of the Bourbon-Penthièvre revenues and châteaux.

Louis Philippe II was given the surname Egalité ("Equality") when French titles of nobility were abolished in 1790. His wife outlived him by almost thirty years.

Louise Marie Thérèse Bathilde d'Orléans married Louis Henry II, Prince of Condé, the last of his house, and was the mother of the Duke of Enghien, who was executed by Napoleon. She died in 1822, the same year as her sister-in-law the Duchess of Orléans. They were both buried in the Chapelle royale de Dreux.

=== French Revolution ===
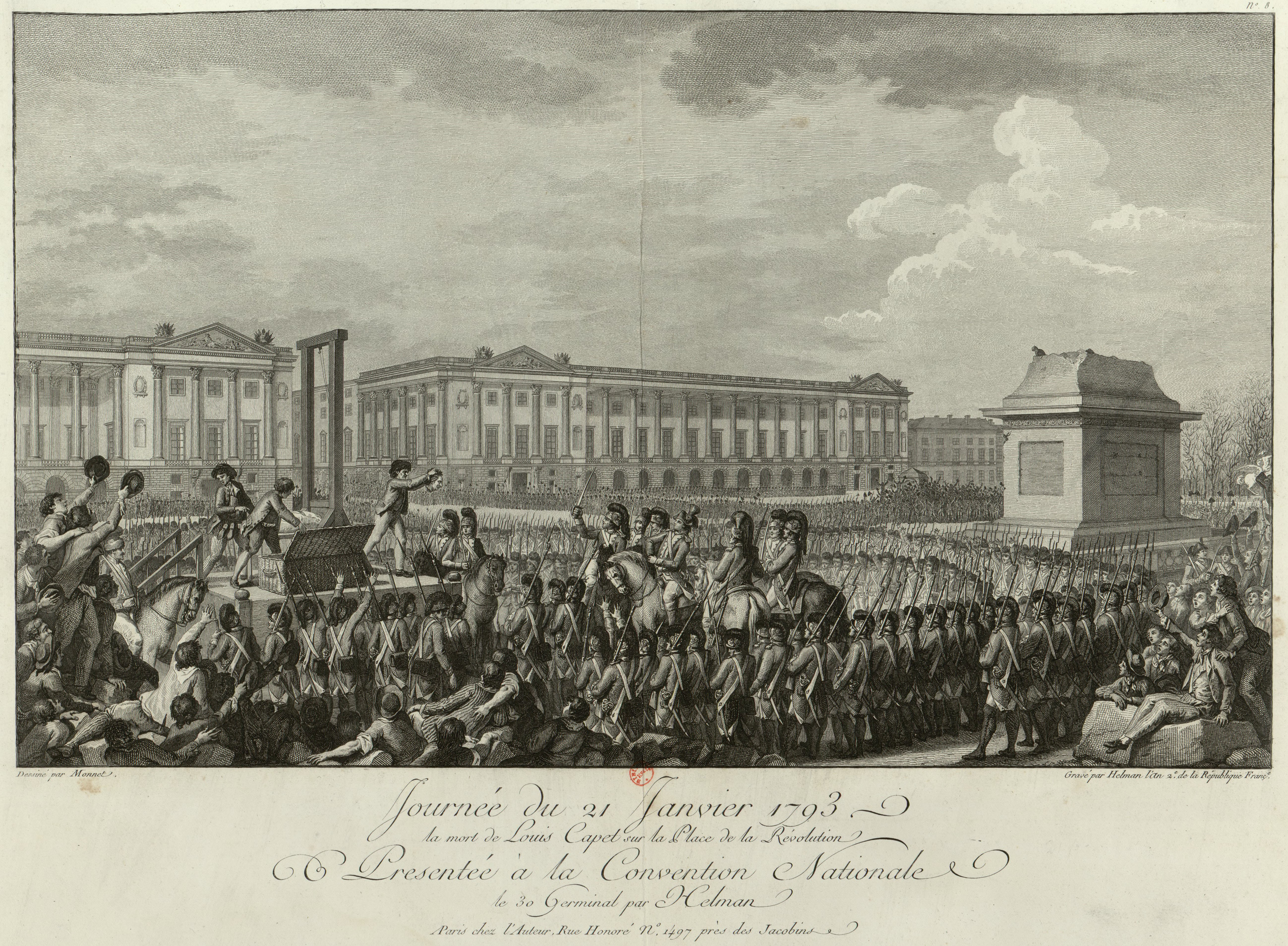
Louis XVI's execution by the guillotine. His cousin, Philippe Égalité, voted for his execution

At the time of the French Revolution, Philippe-Egalité, was the only person of the royal family to actively support the revolution.

He went so far as to vote for the execution of his cousin, Louis XVI, an act which earned him popularity among the revolutionaries, and the undying hostility of many French monarchists. He remained in prison until October, the beginning of the Reign of Terror. He was shortlisted for a trial on 3 October, and effectively tried and guillotined in the space of one day, on the orders of Maximilien Robespierre.

Most of the Orléans family were forced to flee. The new Duke of Orléans had fled to Austria several months previously, triggering the arrest of his father. His brother, the Duke of Montpensier, would die in England, and his sister fled to Switzerland after being imprisoned for a while. The youngest brother, Louis-Charles, Count of Beaujolais, was thrown into a prison in the south of France (Fort-Saint-Jean in Marseille) in 1793, but later escaped to the United States. He too died in exile. Of the Orléans, only the widow of Philippe Egalité was able to remain in France unhindered until, in 1797 she, too, was banished to Spain along with the few remaining Bourbons who still lived in France.

In 1814 during the First Bourbon Restoration, the three remaining members of the family, the Duke of Orléans, his mother and sister, returned to Paris. The family's properties and titles were returned to them by Louis XVIII.

=== July Monarchy ===
The arms of the King of the French (1830-1848)

The arms of the Kingdom of France (1831-1848)

In 1830, following the success of the French July Revolution, the House of Orléans became the ruling house when the monarch of the elder restored Bourbon line, Charles X, was replaced by the 6th duke, Louis-Philippe III d'Orléans, son of Philippe-Egalité. Louis Philippe ruled as a constitutional monarch, and as such was called King of the French, rather than "of France". His reign lasted until the Revolution of 1848, when he abdicated and fled to England.

Even after his ouster, an Orléanist faction remained active, supporting a return of the House of Orléans to power. Legitimist monarchists however continued to uphold the rights of the elder line of Bourbons, who came close to regaining the throne after the fall of the Second Empire. In the early 1870s, a majority of deputies in the National Assembly were monarchists, as was the nation's president, MacMahon. Thus, it was widely expected that the old dynasty would be invited to re-mount the throne, in the person of either the Bourbon or the Orléans claimant.

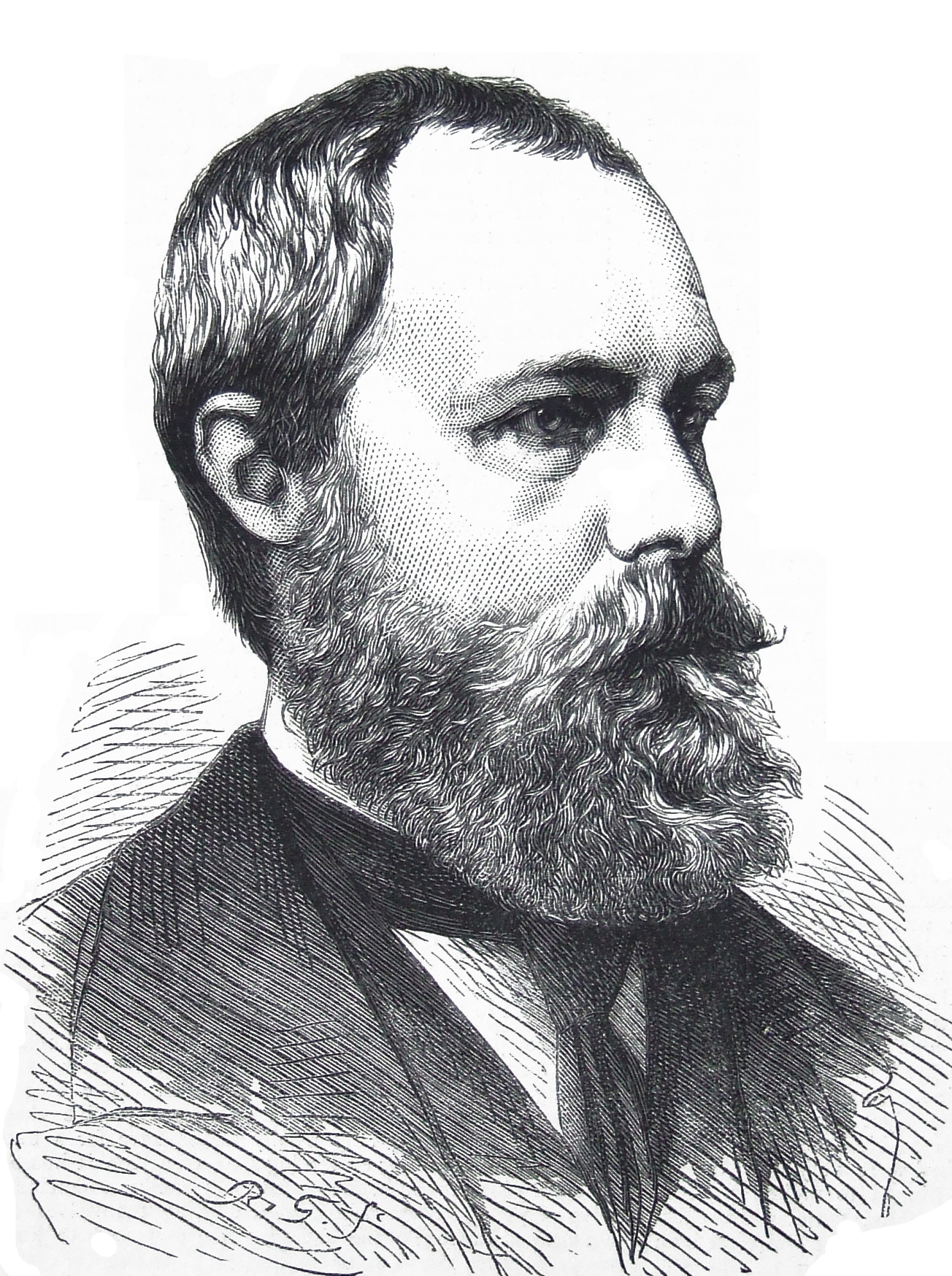
Louis-Philippe Albert d'Orléans, Count of Paris

To seize this opportunity the Orléanists offered a so-called fusion, whereby King Louis Philippe's grandson and heir, Prince Philippe, Count of Paris, accepted the childless Legitimist pretender's right to the throne, thereby potentially uniting French royalists in support of a single candidate. But the refusal of the last male of Louis XIV's direct line, the Count of Chambord, to accept the tricolore as France's flag under a restored monarchy proved an insurmountable obstacle to his candidacy.

Although the Orléans had reigned under the tricolor without objection, this time the Orléans princes did not abandon the cause of the head of their dynasty by seeking to offer themselves as alternative candidates; by the time Chambord died and the Orléans felt free to re-assert their claim to the throne, the political moment had passed, and France had become resolutely republican. France has had neither a Bourbon nor Orléans monarch since 1848.

Louis-Philippe and his family lived in England until his death in Claremont, Surrey. Like his mother, he and his wife, Amelia (1782–1866), were buried at the Chapelle royale de Dreux. In 1883, the Count of Chambord died without children. As a result, some Legitimists recognized the House of Orléans as the heirs to the throne of France.

However, a portion of the Legitimists, still resentful of the revolutionary credentials of the House of Orléans, transferred their loyalties to the Carlist heirs of the Spanish Bourbons, who represented the most senior branch of the Capetians even though they had renounced their claim to the French throne to obtain Spain in 1713.

Thus to their supporters, not only are the heads of the House of Orléans the rightful heirs to the constitutionalist title of "King of the French", but also to the Legitimist title of "King of France and Navarre".

== Heads of the House ==
Name	Portrait	Birth	Marriage(s)	Death	Succession right(s)	Ref.
Philippe I, Duke of Orléans; 10 May 1661 – 9 June 1701 (40 years and 1 month)		21 September 1640; Saint-Germain-en-Laye Son of Louis XIII, King of France and Queen Anne of Austria	(1) Henrietta of England (m. 1661; d. 1670); 3 children (2) Elizabeth Charlotte of the Palatinate (m. 1671; w. 1701); 3 children	9 June 1701; Saint-Cloud; Aged 60	Created Duke of Orléans by Louis XIV, King of France	
Philippe II, Duke of Orléans; 9 June 1701 – 2 December 1723 (22 years, 5 months and 24 days)		2 August 1674; Saint-Cloud Son of Philippe I and Elizabeth Charlotte of the Palatinate	Françoise Marie de Bourbon (m. 1692; w. 1723); 8 children	2 December 1723; Versailles; Aged 49	Son of Philippe I (proximity of blood)	—N/a
Louis, Duke of Orléans; 2 December 1723 – 4 February 1752 (28 years, 2 months and 3 days)		4 August 1703; Versailles Son of Philippe II and Françoise Marie de Bourbon	Auguste of Baden-Baden (m. 1724; d. 1726); 8 children	4 February 1752; Paris; Aged 48	Son of Philippe II (primogeniture)	—N/a
Louis Philippe I, Duke of Orléans; 4 February 1752 – 18 November 1785 (33 years, 9 months and 15 days)		12 May 1725; Versailles Son of Louis and Auguste of Baden-Baden	(1) Louise Henriette de Bourbon (m. 1743; d. 1759); 3 children (2) Charlotte-Jeanne Béraud de La Haye de Riou (m. 1773; w. 1785); Childless	18 November 1785; Seine-Port; Aged 60	Son of Louis	—N/a
Louis Philippe II, Duke of Orléans; 18 November 1785 – 8 September 1792 (Renounced to nobility after 6 years, 9 months and 22 days)		13 April 1747; Saint-Cloud Son of Louis Philippe I and Louise Henriette de Bourbon	Louise Marie Adélaïde de Bourbon (m. 1768; w. 1793); 5 children	6 November 1793; Paris; Executed for treason Aged 46	Son of Louis Philippe I (primogeniture)	
Louis Philippe II continued to be the informal head of the House until his execution in 1793; after that his son Louis Philippe III claimed his titles.
Louis Philippe III, Duke of Orléans from 1830 to 1848; Louis Philippe I, King of the French; 6 November 1793 – 26 August 1850 (56 years, 9 months and 21 days)		6 October 1773; Paris Son of Louis Philippe II and Louise Marie Adélaïde de Bourbon	Maria Amalia of Naples and Sicily (m. 1809; w. 1850); 10 children	26 August 1850; Claremont, Surrey, England; Aged 76	Son of Louis Philippe II (primogeniture)	
Prince Philippe, Count of Paris (Philip VII, if king); 26 August 1850 – 8 September 1894 (44 years and 14 days)		24 August 1838; Paris Son of Ferdinand Philippe, Duke of Orléans and Helene of Mecklenburg-Schwerin	Marie Isabelle of Orléans (m. 1864; w. 1894); 8 children	8 September 1894; Stowe House, Buckinghamshire, England; Aged 56	Grandson of Louis Philippe I	
Prince Philippe, Duke of Orléans (Philip VIII, if king); 8 September 1894 – 28 March 1926 (31 years, 6 months and 21 days)		6 February 1869; Twickenham, London Son of Prince Philippe, Count of Paris and Marie Isabelle of Orléans	Maria Dorothea of Austria (m. 1896; w. 1926); Childless	28 March 1926; Palermo; Aged 57	Son of Prince Philippe (primogeniture)	—N/a
Prince Jean, Duke of Guise (John III, if king); 28 March 1926 – 25 August 1940 (14 years, 4 months and 29 days)		4 September 1874; Paris Son of Prince Robert, Duke of Chartres and Françoise of Orléans	Isabelle of Orléans (m. 1899; w. 1940); 4 children	25 August 1940; Larache; Aged 65	Great-grandson of Louis Philippe I Cousin and brother-in-law of Prince Philippe, Duke of Orléans	—N/a
Henri, Count of Paris (Henry VI, if king); 25 August 1940 – 19 June 1999 (58 years, 9 months and 26 days)		5 July 1908; Le Nouvion-en-Thiérache Son of Jean, Duke of Guise and Isabelle of Orléans	Isabelle of Orléans-Braganza (m. 1931; w. 1999); 11 children	19 June 1999; Cherisy; Aged 90	Son of Jean, Duke of Guise	
Henri, Count of Paris (Henry VII, if king); 19 June 1999 – 21 January 2019 (19 years, 7 months and 3 days)		14 June 1933; Woluwe-Saint-Pierre Son of Henri, Count of Paris and Isabelle of Orléans-Braganza	(1) Marie-Thérèse of Württemberg (m. 1957; div. 1984); 5 children (2) Micaela Cousiño Quiñones de León (m. 1984); Childless	21 January 2019; Dreux; Aged 85	Son of Henri, Count of Paris (primogeniture)	—N/a
Jean, Count of Paris (John IV, if king) since 21 January 2019 (7 years, 10 months and 2 days)		19 May 1965; Paris Son of Henri, Count of Paris and Marie-Thérèse of Württemberg	Philomena de Tornos Steinhart (m. 2009); 5 children		Son of Henri, Count of Paris	—N/a

== Contemporary family ==
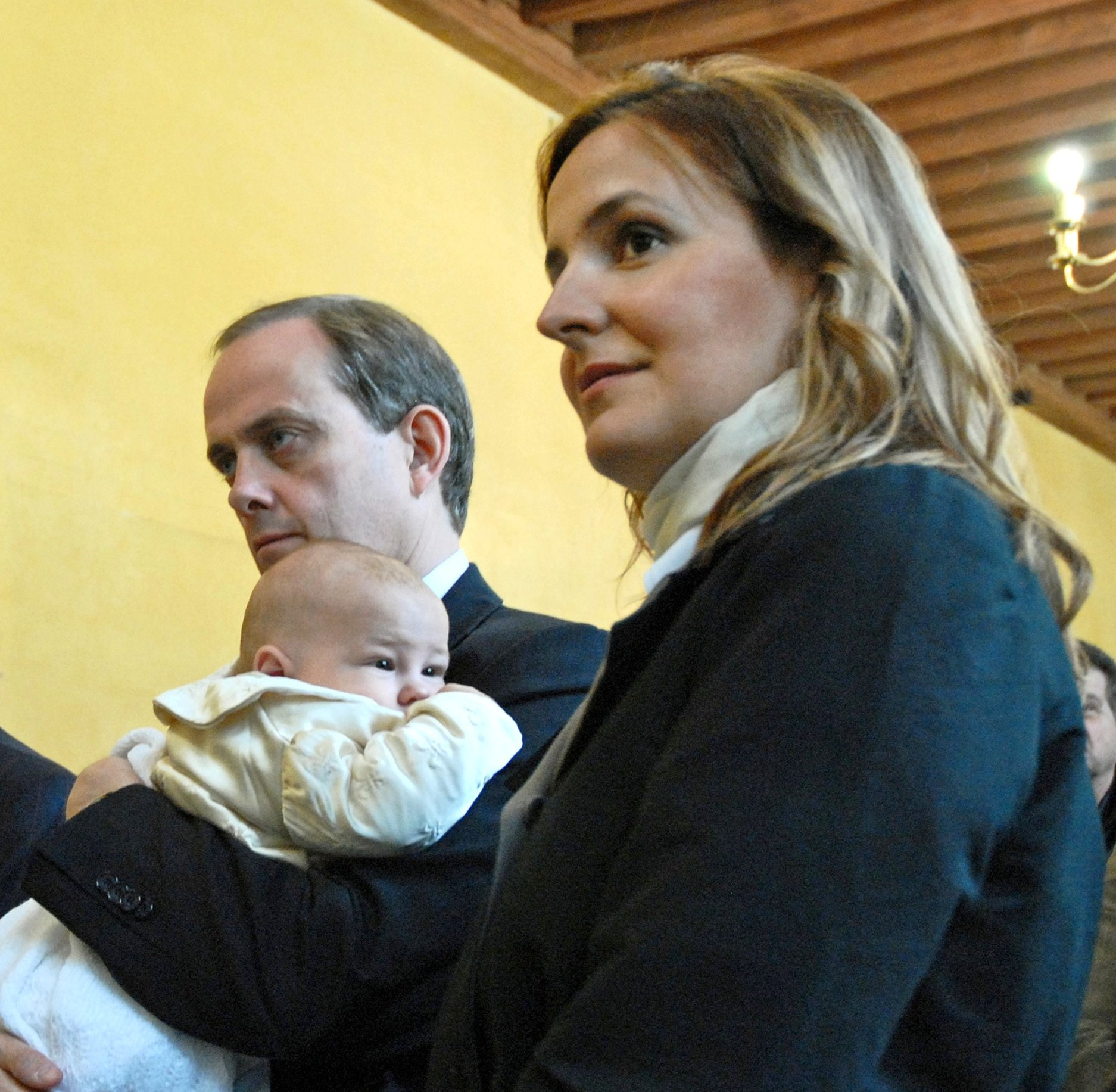
Jean of Orléans, current head of the house, with his wife and heir apparent, Prince Gaston, Dauphin of France.

The current head of the house is Jean, Count of Paris (born 1965), who is a claimant to the French throne as John IV. For the Orléanists, his pretense is due to being the heir of King Louis Philippe I of the French. For Legitimists, his pretense is due to being the heir of Henri, Count of Chambord, and so of Charles X of France.

Present family

On 5 July 1957, Henri, Count of Paris married Duchess Marie Thérèse of Württemberg (born 1934), another descendant of King Louis Philippe. He received the title Count of Clermont. Five children were born from this union, before the marriage ended in divorce.

1. Princess Marie Isabelle Marguerite Anne Geneviève of Orléans (born 3 January 1959, Boulogne sur Seine) married civilly at Dreux on 22 July 1989 and religiously in Friedrichshafen on 22 July 1989 to Prince Gundakar of Liechtenstein (born 1 April 1949, Vienna), of whom she has five children
  - Princess Léopoldine Eléonore Thérèse Marie of Liechtenstein (born 27 June 1990, Vienna)
  - Princess Marie Immaculata Elisabeth Rose Aldegunde of Liechtenstein (born 15 December 1991, Vienna)
  - Prince Johann Wenzel Karl Emmeran Bonifatius Maria of Liechtenstein (born 17 March 1993, Vienna)
  - Princess Margarete Franciska Daria Wilhelmine Marie of Liechtenstein (born 10 January 1995, Vienna)
  - Prince Gabriel Karl Bonaventura Alfred Valerian Maria of Liechtenstein (born 6 May 1998, Vienna)
2. Prince François Henri Louis Marie of Orléans (born 7 February 1961, Boulogne sur Seine – died 30 December 2017), Count of Clermont, was severely disabled (due to mother's toxoplasmosis during pregnancy).
3. Princess Blanche Elisabeth Rose Marie of Orléans (born 10 September 1962, Ravensburg), severely disabled (due to the same cause as her elder brother).
4. Prince Jean Charles Pierre Marie of Orléans (born 19 May 1965, Boulogne sur Seine), Duke of Vendôme and Dauphin de Viennois, married civilly in Paris on 19 March 2009 and religiously at the Cathédrale Notre-Dame at Senlis on 2 May 2009 to Philomena de Tornos Steinhart (born 19 June 1977, Vienna), with whom he has six children
  - Prince Gaston Louis Antoine Marie of Orléans (born 19 November 2009, Paris)
  - Princess Antoinette Léopoldine Jeanne Marie of Orléans (born 28 January 2012, Vienna)
  - Princess Louise-Marguerite Eléonore Marie of Orléans (born 30 July 2014, Poissy)
  - Prince Joseph Gabriel David Marie of Orléans (born 2 June 2016)
  - Princess Jacinthe Elisabeth-Charlotte Marie of Orleans (born October 2018)
  - Prince Alphonse Charles François Marie of Orléans (born 31 December 2023)
5. Prince Eudes Thibaut Joseph Marie of Orléans (born 18 March 1968, Paris), Duke of Angoulême, married civilly at Dreux on 19 June 1999 and religiously in Antrain on 10 July 1999 to Marie-Liesse Claude Anne Rolande de Rohan-Chabot (born 29 June 1969, Paris), with whom he has two children
  - Princess Thérèse Isabelle Marie Eléonore (born 23 April 2001, Cannes)
  - Prince Pierre Jean Marie d'Orléans (born 6 August 2003, Cannes)

Jean, Count of Paris, is now the head of the house.

== Wealth and finances ==
=== Appanages ===
Throughout the years of the ancien régime, the Orléans household received vast riches in terms of wealth and property. Philippe de France obtained for the House of Bourbon-Orléans, during the rule of his brother Louis XIV, the following:

- The ducal titles of Orléans, Valois, Chartres and the lordship of Montargis. This occurred in 1660, shortly after the death of Gaston, Duke of Orléans, who had no male descendants. The family might also have obtained the county of Blois and with it the Château de Blois, Château de Chambord, and also the governorship of Languedoc, but Philippe de France was refused these by his brother.
- In 1672, Louis XIV added the Duchy of Nemours, the countships of Dourdan and Romorantin, and the marquisates of Coucy and Folembray.
- In 1692, Philippe's son and heir, Philippe II, married Françoise-Marie de Bourbon, a legitimated daughter of Louis XIV by his liaison with Madame de Montespan. In order to convince his brother to allow his son to marry one of his illegitimate daughters, the king gave him the Palais-Royal, which Philippe I had already occupied since his first marriage, and promised him a dowry of two million livres. This palace became the Paris residence of the Dukes of Orléans until 1792.
- The Orléans canal, built by Philippe de France, was used by the family to transport their timber from the Orléans forest to the capital where it was sold. The canal was nationalised during the revolution.

Under the regent, Philippe II, d'Orléans:

- He quietly increased his wife's annual allowance to 400,000 livres while he was in power. He also bought many buildings around Paris, although many were sold by his grandson. It was also he who bought the Regent Diamond (also known as Le Régent), which was kept at the Louvre in Paris.

Under Louis d'Orléans:

- In 1740, Louis XV added the Hôtel de Grand-Ferrare at Fontainebleau
- The king added the countship of Soissons in 1751 and the lordships of Laon, Crépy and Noyon.
- By 1734, the family's income exceeded one million livres annually in rents due from the ducal domains of Orléans, Valois, Chartres, and the lordship of Montargis. Sales of timber from such vast tracts as the Orléans forest, added 500,000 livres.

Under Louis Philippe I d'Orléans:

- Rents came in from the towns of La Fère, Marle, Ham, Saint-Gobain, the Hôtel Duplessis-Châtillon and from the Ourcq canal.

Because the Dukes of Orléans were also the premier princes du sang, the kingdom's treasury paid for their personal household of 265 staff and officers. Along with towns and buildings, the family derived income from its forests on the ducal lands at Orléans, Beaugency, Montargis, Romorantin, Dourdan, Bruadan, Villers-Cotterêts (at which they had a château), Laigne, Coucy, La Fère, Marle, and Saint-Gobin.

- The original appanage was returned to the Orléans family in May 1814 by Louis XVIII. It was united with the domain of the Crown upon Louis-Philippe d'Orléans' accession to the throne in 1830, at which time it was worth about 2.5 million francs in annual income.

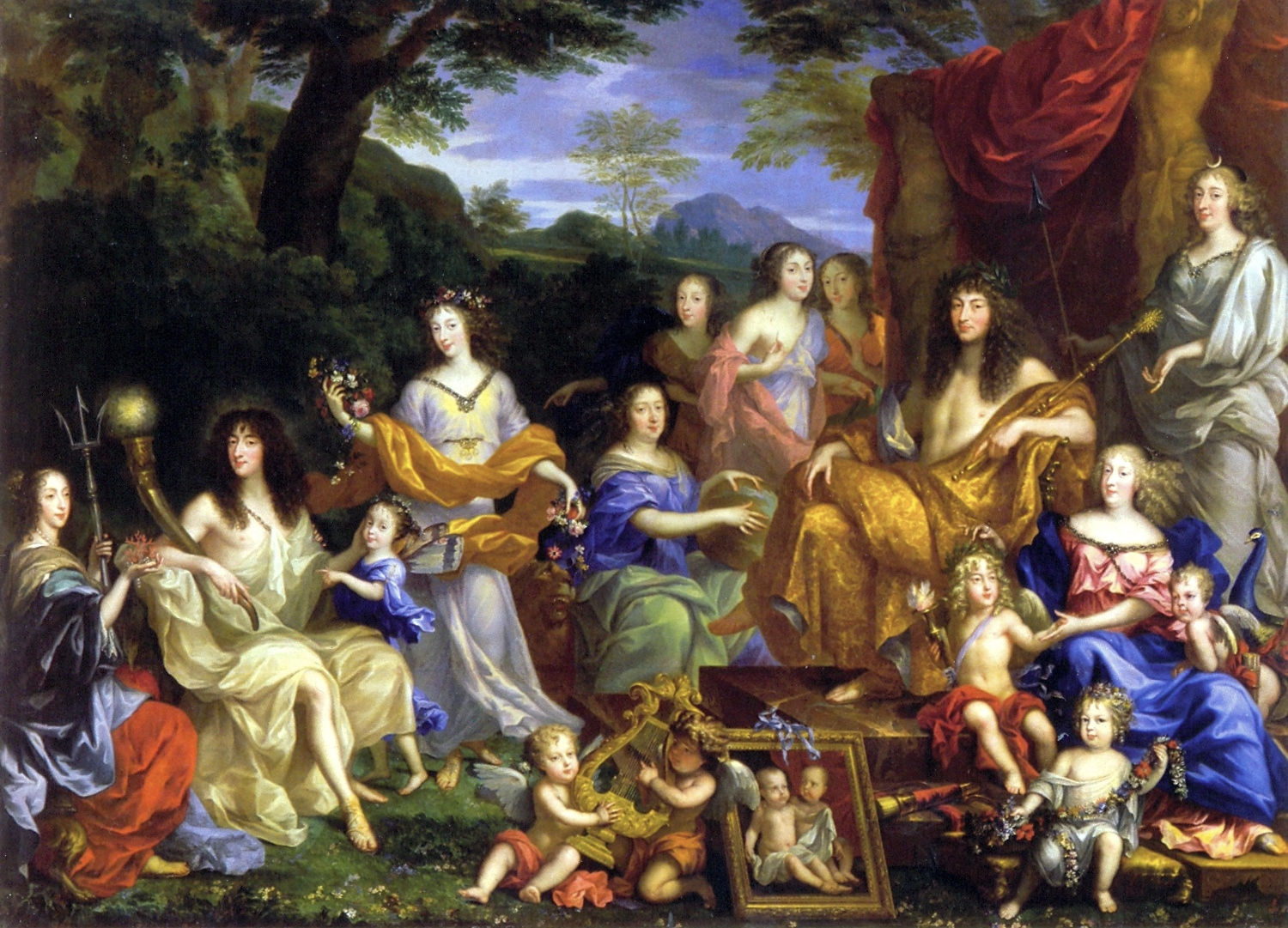
A posthumous mural commissioned around 1670 by Philippe I, Duke of Orléans. It includes: Henrietta Maria of France (d 1669), exiled Queen of England; Philippe de France, founder of the House of Orléans; his first wife Henrietta Anne Stuart (d 1670); the couple's first daughter Marie Louise of Orléans (later Queen of Spain); Anne of Austria (d 1666); the Orléans daughters of Gaston de France; Louis XIV; the Dauphin with his mother Maria Theresa of Spain with her third daughter Marie-Thérèse de France, called Madame Royale (d. 1672) and her second son Philippe-Charles, Duke of Anjou (d. 1671). The first daughter of Gaston stands on the far right: Anne Marie Louise d'Orléans. The picture frame with the two children are the other 2 daughters of Louis and Maria Theresa who died in 1662 and 1664.

=== Residences ===
Philippe I and his wife had to spend most of their time at the royal court of his brother Louis XIV. For this purpose they had apartments at the Palace of Versailles, the Château de Saint-Germain-en-Laye, the Palace of Fontainebleau and the Château de Marly, as did most other members of the House of Bourbon. Their private home, given to them by the king, was the Palais Royal, Paris. Furthermore, Philippe I had bought the Château de Saint-Cloud, located between Paris and Versailles, in 1658. Later he replaced it with a new baroque building, including vast gardens on the Seine River. He also had a number of smaller rural properties. Louis Philippe I, Duke of Orléans, sold the Palais Royal and the Château de Saint-Cloud to King Louis XVI, shortly before the Revolution, however still occupying an apartment at the Palais Royal. Their private residences then became the Château du Raincy and the Château de Sainte-Assise at Seine-Port.

Before the court was officially moved to Versailles, and before the birth of his nephew, the king's son, the Dauphin Louis de France, in 1661, the Duke of Orléans' apartments in the Palace of Versailles were where the Dauphin's now are located. The apartments looked over the Parterres du Midi of the south and were directly under the Grand Appartement de la reine. After the dauphin's birth, the Orléans had to move to the north wing and occupied large quarters there. These looked out onto the Parterres du Midi of the south. The family also had apartments where the modern day Galerie des batailles are. This area was used by the Duke himself, his second wife, Elizabeth Charlotte of the Palatinate, his son, Philippe II and daughter-in-law, Françoise-Marie de Bourbon. The apartments of the family were later moved to the bottom floor of the north wing, opposite the Chapelle Royal de Versailles, this time looking over the Parterres du Midi of the north. The family had been moved in order to accommodate three of Louis XV's daughters, Madame Adélaïde, Madame Victoire, and Madame Sophie. The family remained there till the French Revolution.

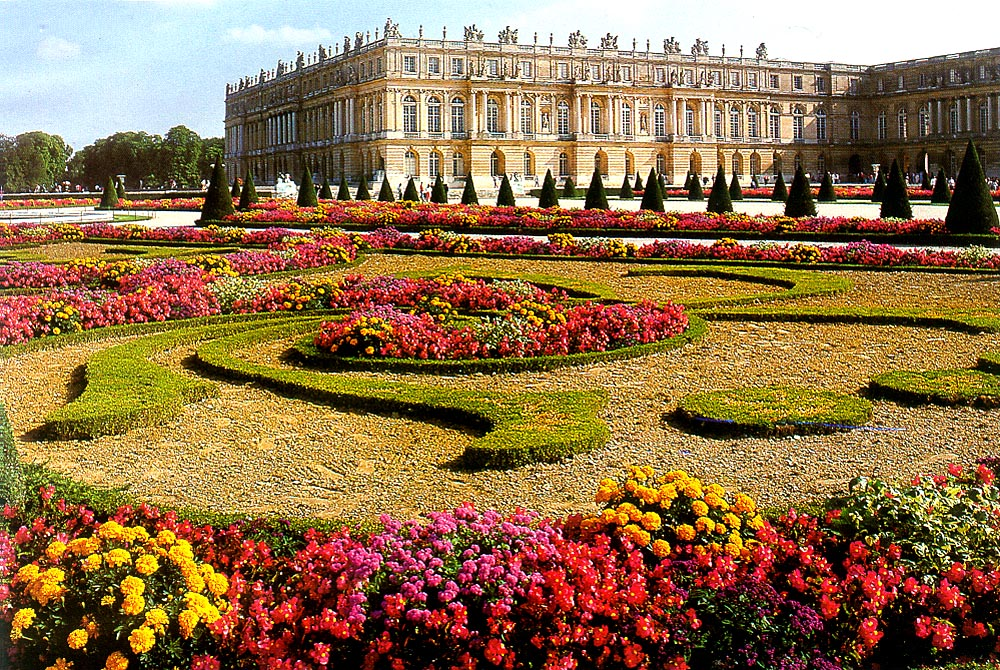
Parterres du Midi at Versailles

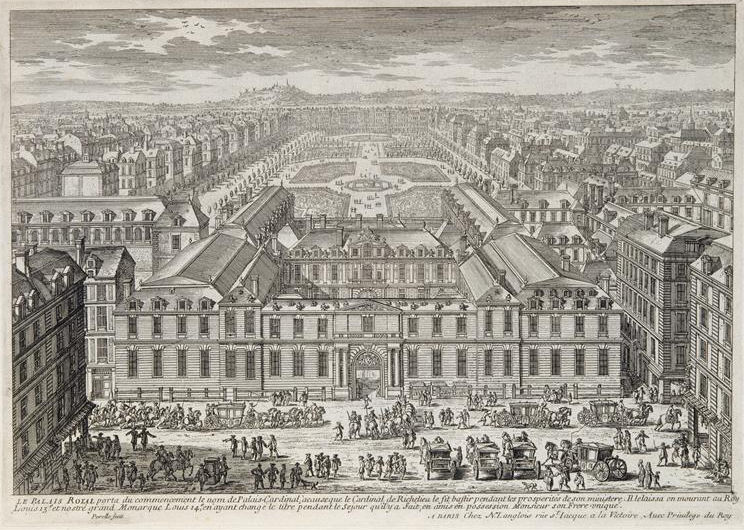
Palais Royal, Paris (1679)

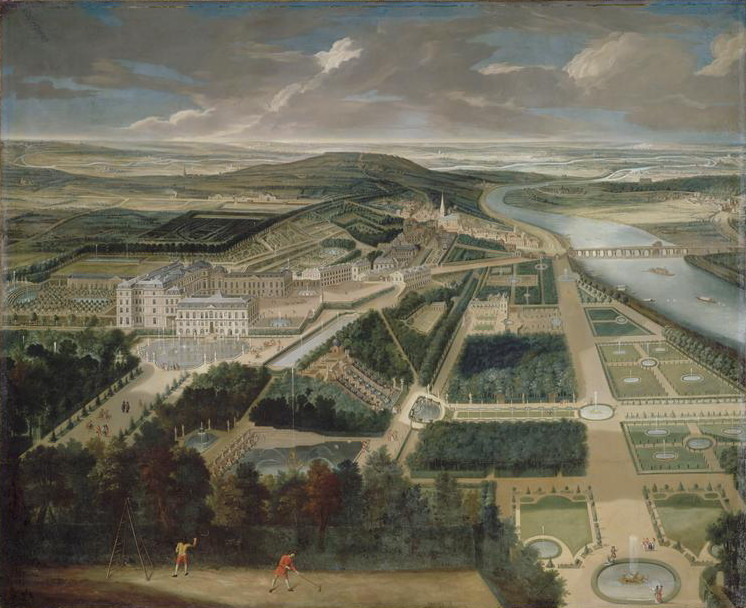
Château de Saint-Cloud

=== Inheritances ===
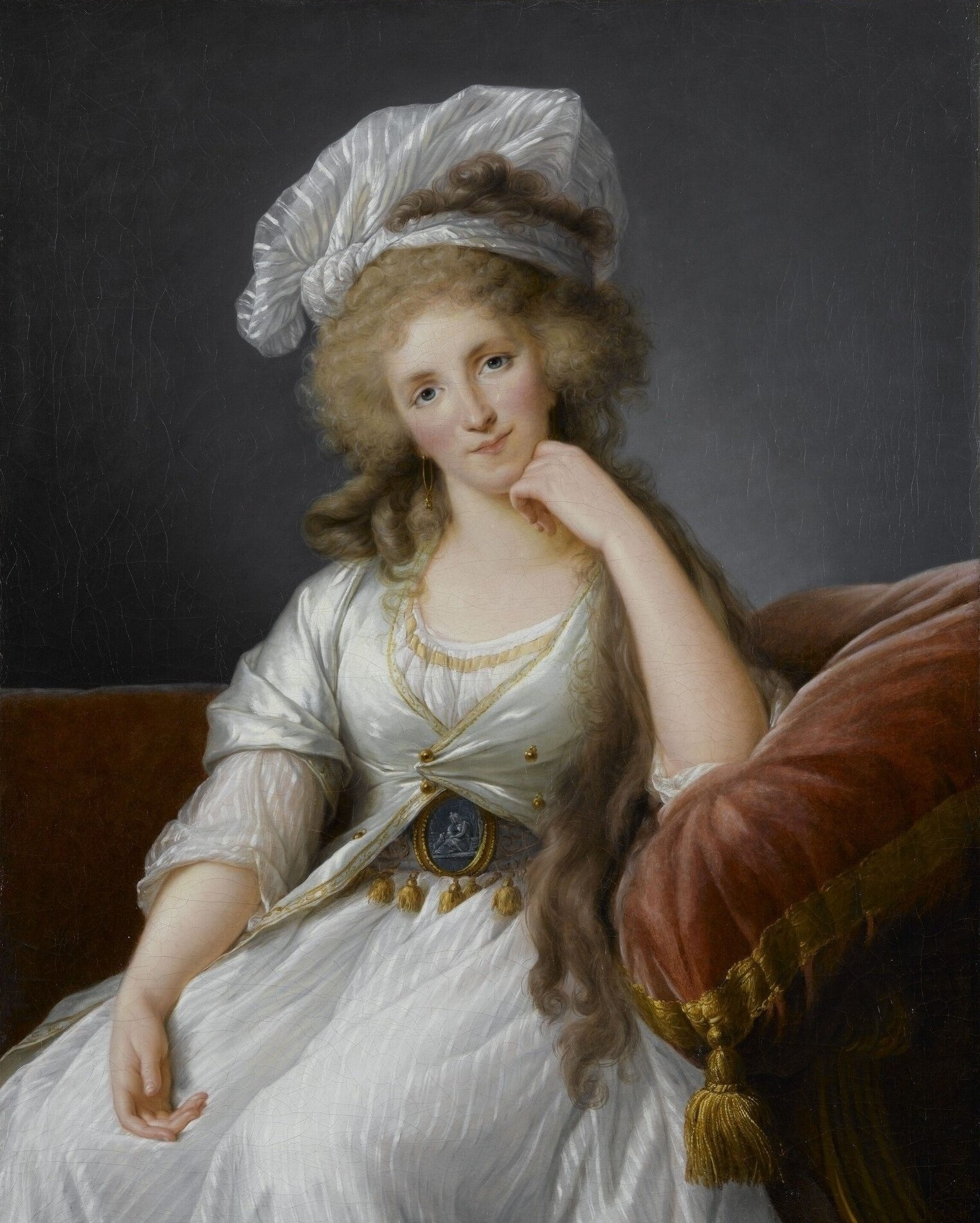
Louise Marie Adélaïde de Bourbon who brought much wealth to the family

Along with their government allowances and because the family were known as the Premier Princes du Sang, they often received fortunes and titles from inheritances:

- In 1693 after the death of Philippe's older cousin, La Grande Mademoiselle.
  - From this the family received the ducal titles of Montpensier, Châtellerault, the marquessate of Mézières-en-Brenne, the counties of Mortain, of Bar-sur-Seine, the viscountcies of Auge and of Domfront.
  - In addition, he also received the barony of Beaujolais, which was later raised to the rank of county, and the principality of Joinville.
- In 1769, Louise Marie Adélaïde de Bourbon, the greatest heiress of her time as the sole surviving child of her father, the famously wealthy Duke of Penthièvre, married her cousin, Louis Philippe II d'Orléans, then Duke of Chatres and later called Philippe Égalité.
  - After the wedding, the Duke of Orléans received his wife's dowry of six million livres, the equivalent of around £20,000,000 today.
  - The Orléans couple then obtained an annual income of 240,000 livres. This later increased to 400,000 livres. The couple also received furniture as part of the marriage settlement.
- The death of the Duke of Penthièvre.
  - In 1793 the wealthy Duke of Penthièvre died and left his whole fortune and lands to his daughter Louise Marie Adélaïde. His previous heir had been his son, the prince de Lamballe, who died young in 1768.

Châteaux The family also later acquired many other châteaux around the country. Among these were the:

- Château de Bagnolet in Paris. This was bought in 1719 by the "Regent", Philippe II, Duke of Orléans, but was sold in 1769 by his grandson.
- Château du Raincy – bought in 1769 by the father of Philippe Égalité.
- Château de Maison-Rouge at Gagny – bought in 1771 from the Marquis de Montfermeil, it was confiscated during the revolution.
- Château de Sainte-Assise at Seine-Port was given as a present by Louis Philippe d'Orléans, Duke of Orléans, to his morganatic wife, Madame de Montesson. After his death, she sold it to the Count of Provence (the future Louis XVIII), in 1787.
- Château de Saint-Leu, in the Val-d'Oise area of France. This would later be bought by Louis Bonaparte and his wife.
- Louis Philippe II, Duke of Orléans, also acquired the land in the north east of Paris that became the Parc Monceau.
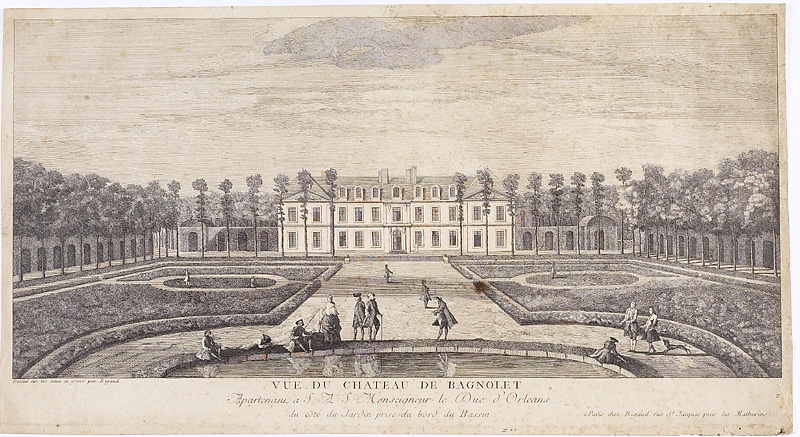
Château de Bagnolet, Paris

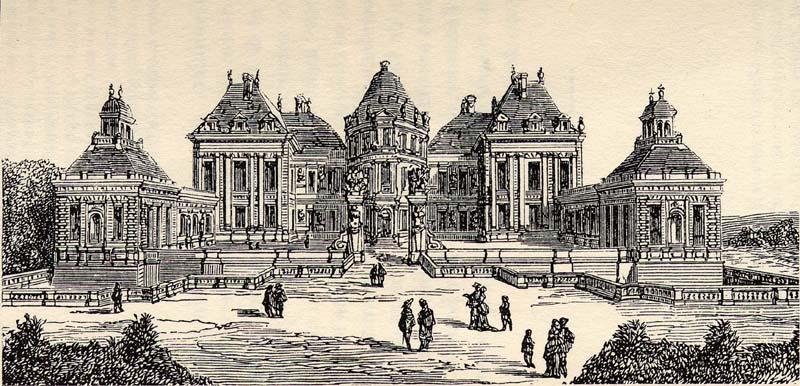
Château du Raincy

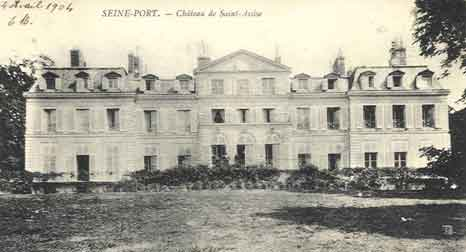
Château de Sainte-Assise

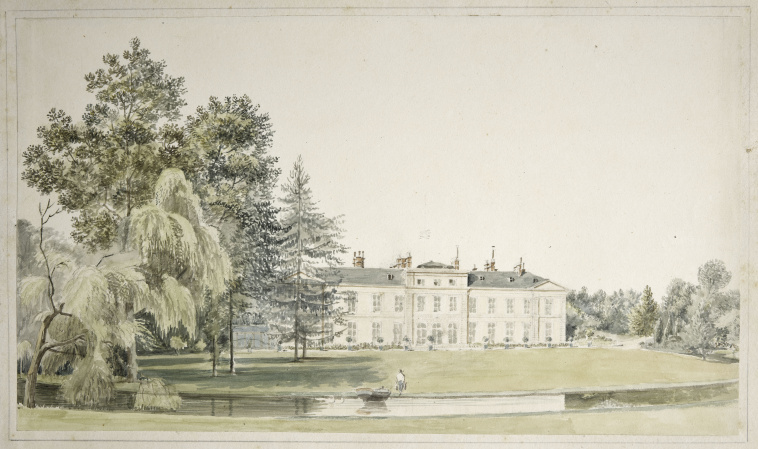
Château de Saint-Leu

Upon the death of the Duke of Orléans's father-in-law in 1793 (the hugely wealthy Duke of Penthièvre), the House of Orléans became the richest in France, however not for a long time. During the French Revolution the surviving members of the House of Orléans sought refuge in exile and their properties were confiscated and mostly resold to new owners. After the Bourbon Restoration of 1815 some of the properties were restituted to the Orléans branch of the Bourbons.

During the July Monarchy, the now reigning royal family acquired the:

- Château de Neuilly – on the borders of 18th-century Paris.
- Château de Maison-Rouge in Gagny – this was given back to the family whilst the Bourbon-Orléans were on the throne of France.
- Château de La Ferté-Vidame – this had also been confiscated during the French Revolution and was the property of Louise Marie Adélaïde de Bourbon-Penthièvre. She had inherited it from her father. On her death it passed to her son, the future King Louis Philippe I of the French.
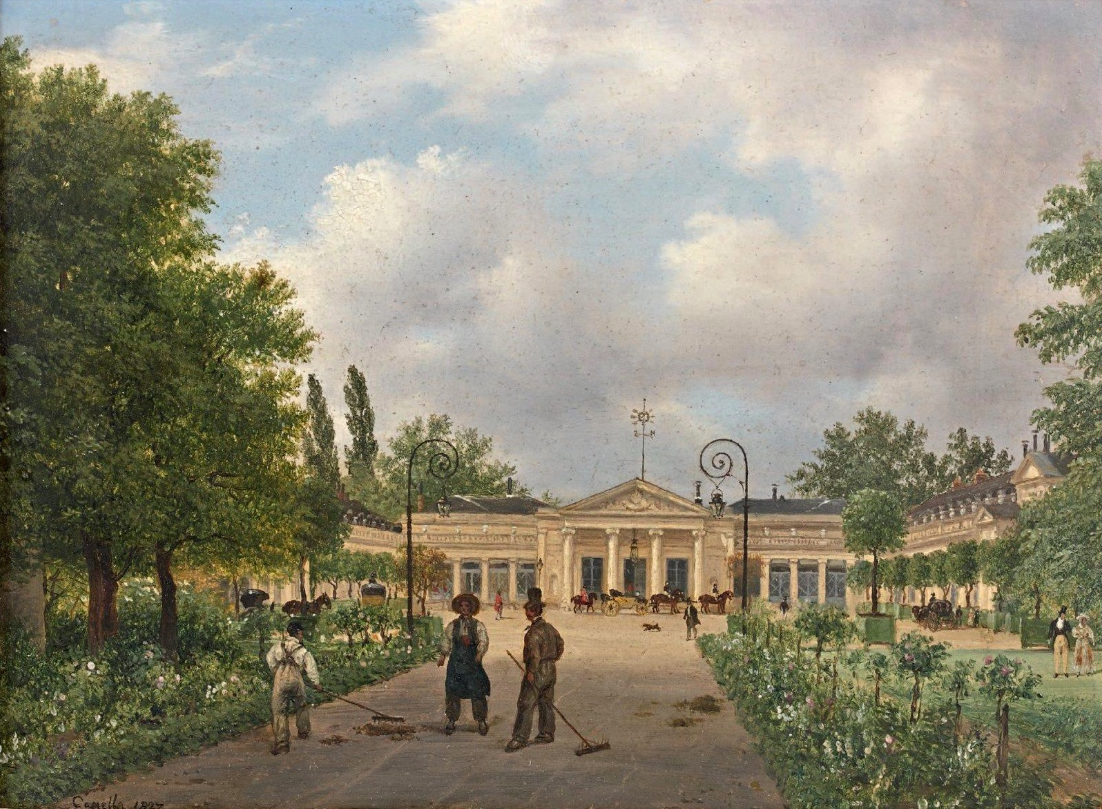
Château de Neuilly

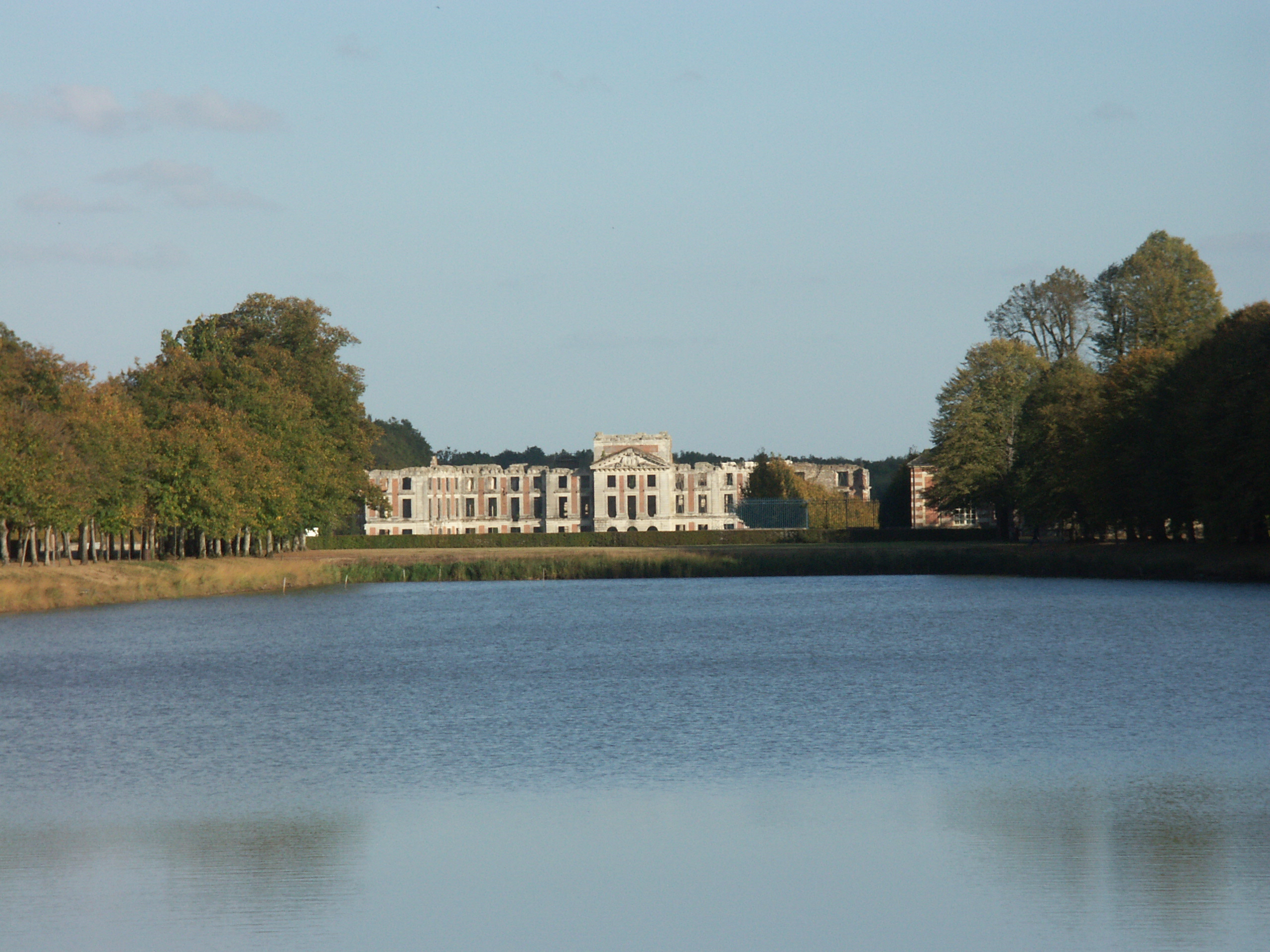
Château de La Ferté-Vidame

After King Louis Philippe I had died in exile in Claremont House, Surrey, in 1850, his property in the French Second Republic was split between his many children and grandchildren. All male members of the House of Orléans were exiled from France by law between 1886 and 1950. When Henri, Count of Paris (born 1908), returned to France in 1950, he didn't find much property left, except for a few castles which produced no income. Having 11 children and divorcing his wife, he decided, in 1974, to transfer the most important family assets to a family foundation, Fondation Saint-Louis, in order to save them from future inheritance distribution and taxes. The respective head of the House of Orléans is honorary chairman of the foundation. Its assets comprise Château d'Amboise (with a family museum), the Château de Bourbon-l'Archambault and the Château de Dreux (private residence), with the Chapelle royale de Dreux, the necropolis of the Orléans royal family. He sold further property, resulting in legal action by his sons, and still died heavily in debt.

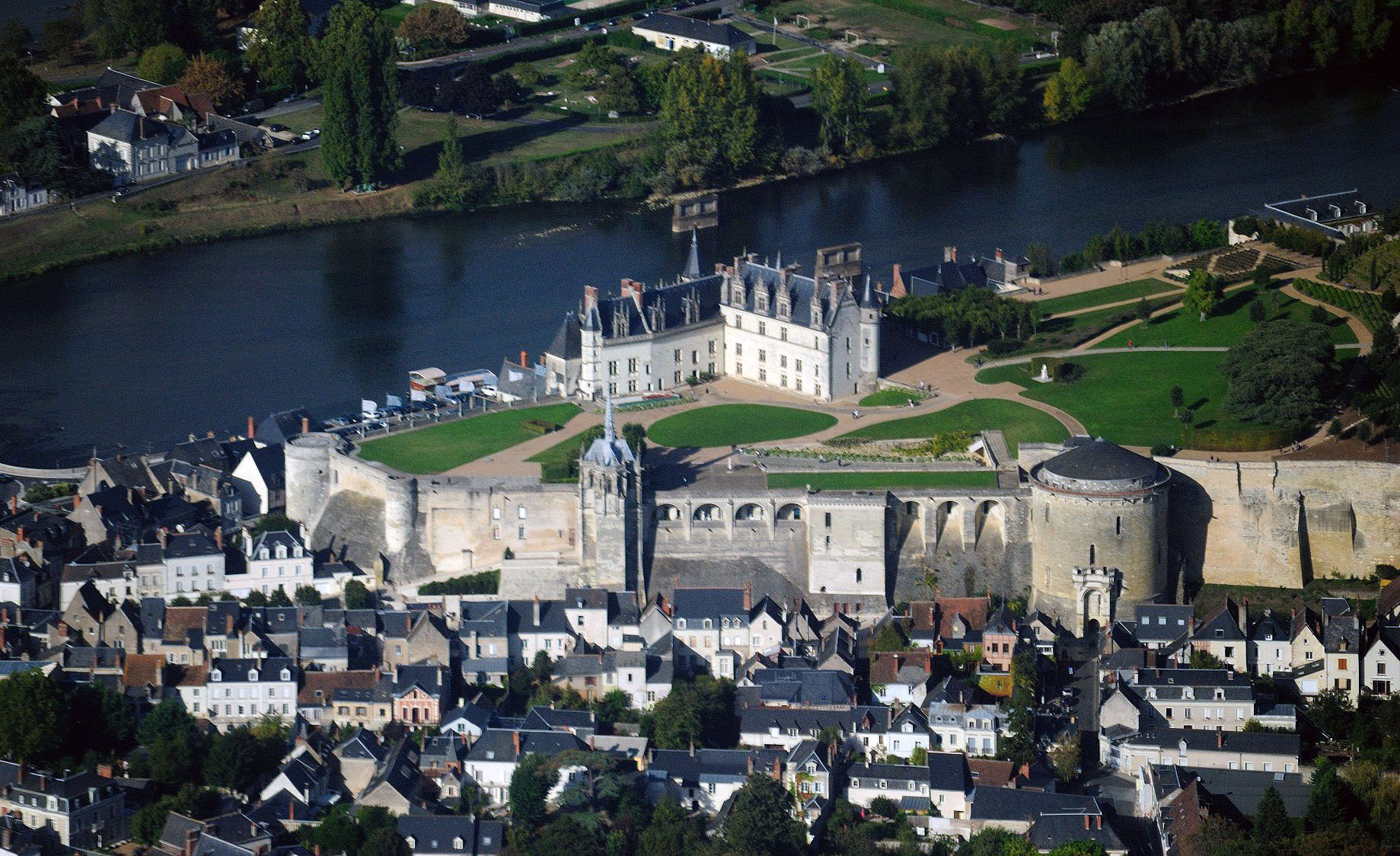
Château d'Amboise

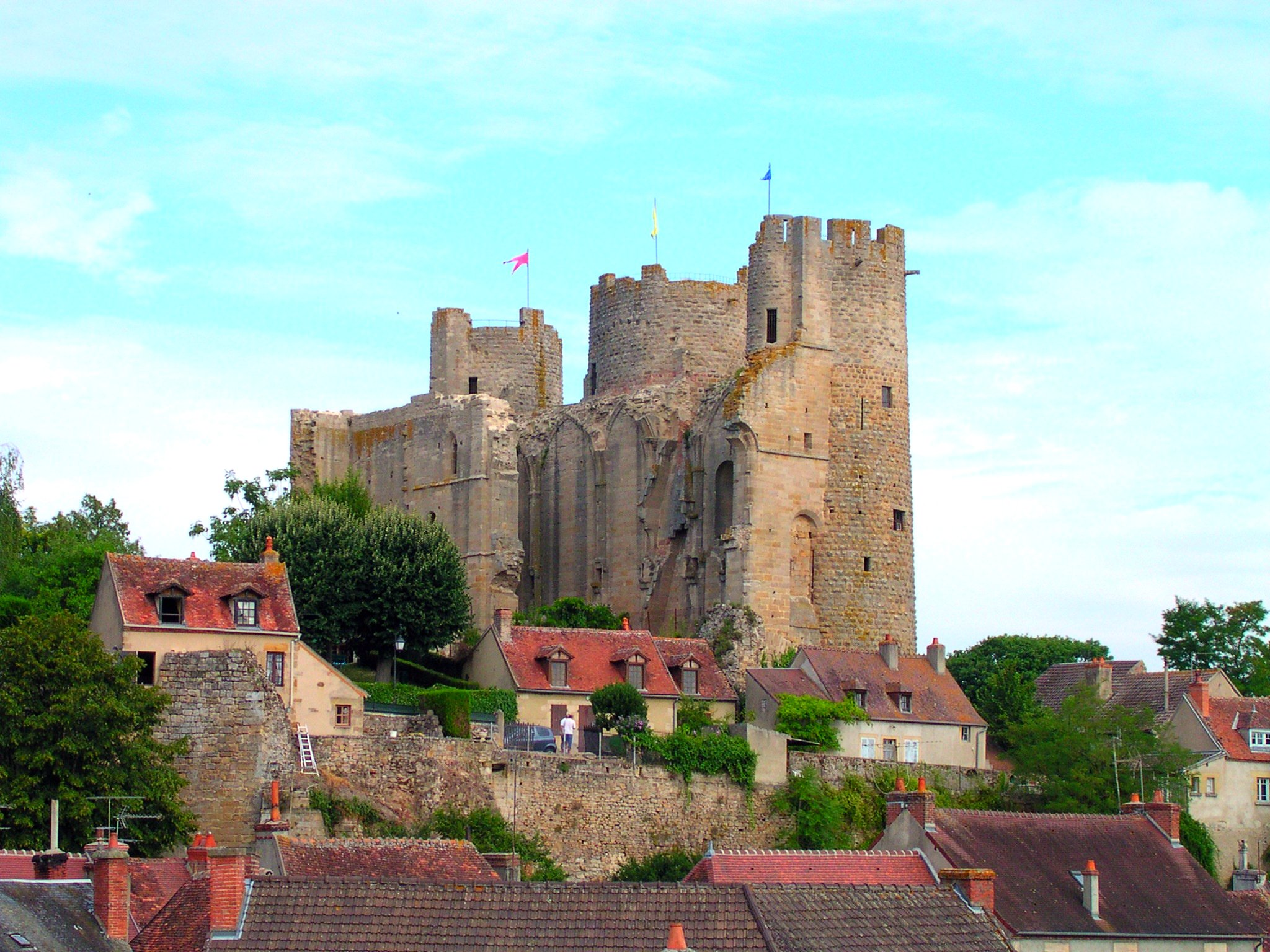
Château de Bourbon-l'Archambault

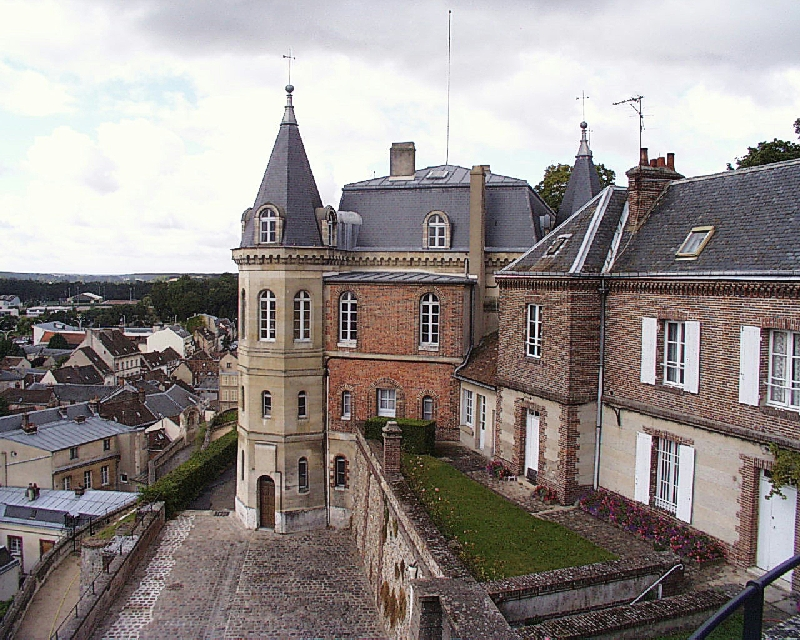
Château de Dreux

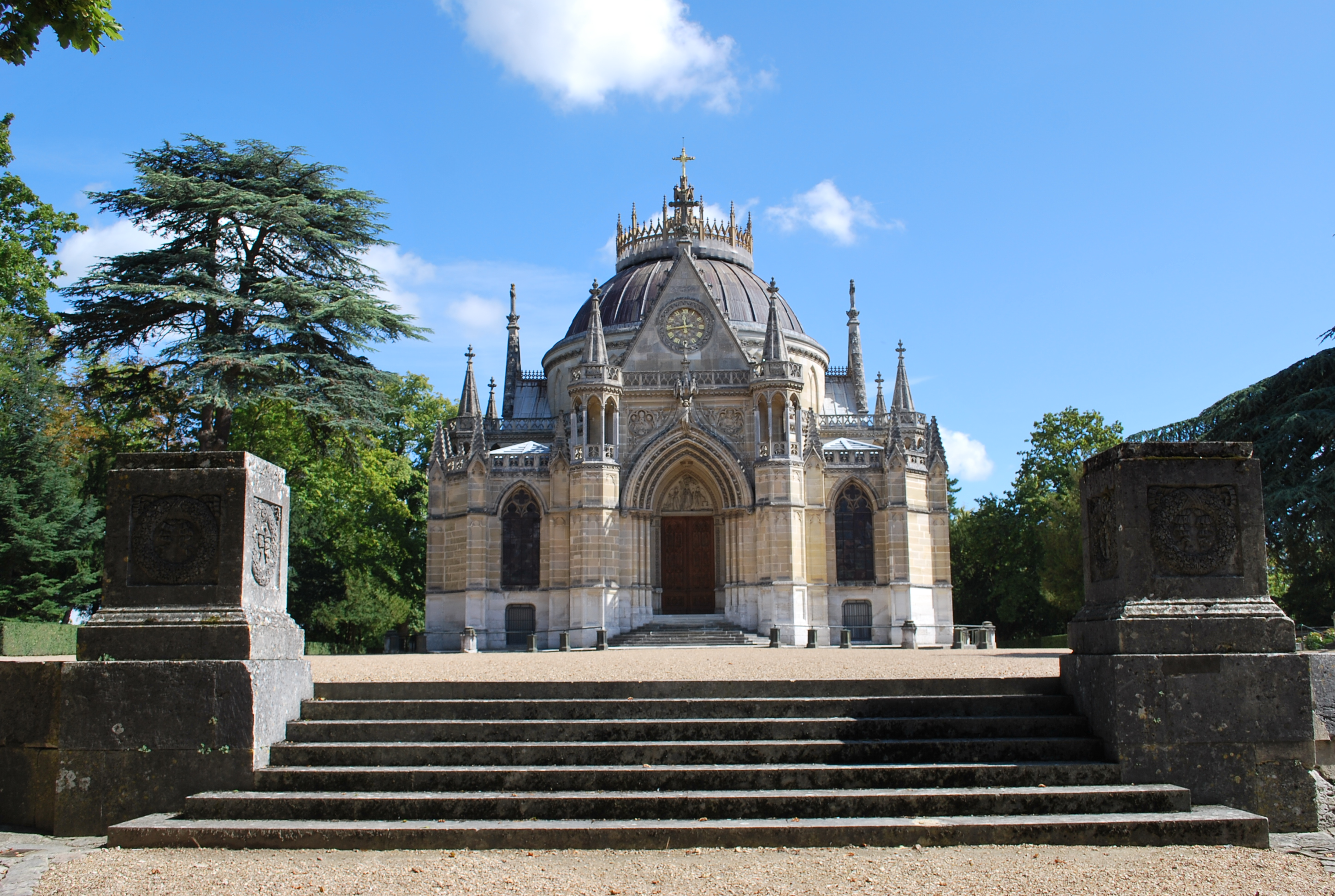
Chapelle royale de Dreux

== Cadet branches ==
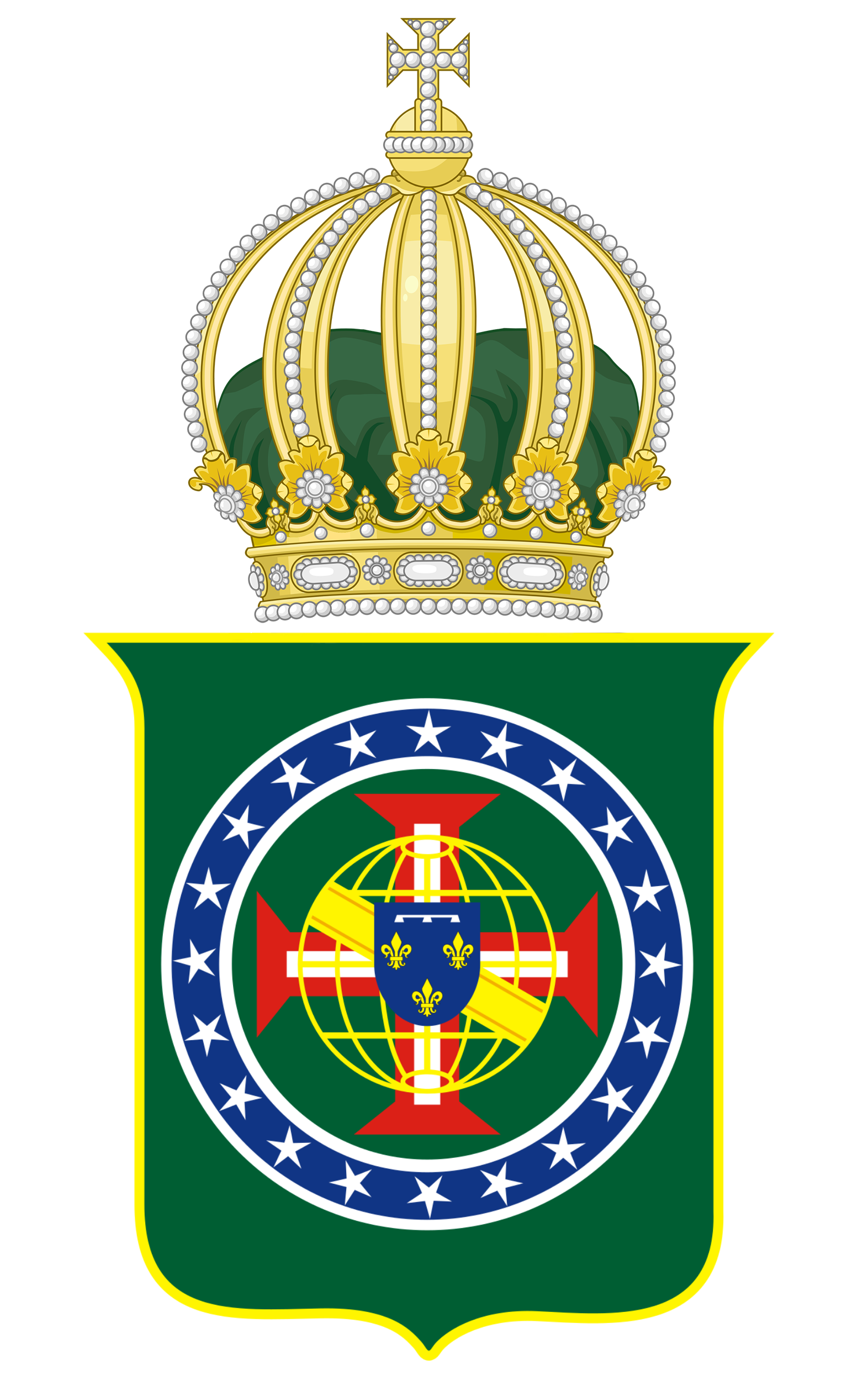
Arms of the House of Orléans-Braganza

=== House of Orléans-Braganza ===
On 15 October 1864 at Rio de Janeiro the eldest son of Louis Charles Philippe Raphael d'Orléans, Duke of Nemours (son of King Louis Philippe I) married Dona Isabel, Princess Imperial of Brazil, eldest daughter and heiress of Emperor Dom Pedro II of Brazil.

It was from that marriage the royal house of Orléans-Braganza was formed. Today they are the present claimants to the throne of the former Empire of Brazil, which ended with the Brazilian Imposition of the republic on 15 November 1889 after a military coup d'état headed by Marshall Deodoro da Fonseca, who became the first President of Brazil.

=== House of Orléans-Galliera ===
Arms of the House of Orléans-Galliera

In the Affair of the Spanish Marriages, Louis Philippe arranged for the marriage of his youngest son, Antoine, Duke of Montpensier, to Infanta Luisa Fernanda of Spain, younger sister of Isabella II. It was generally thought that she would succeed her sister as queen, since the Spanish queen's prospective husband was the effeminate Francis, Duke of Cádiz.

The British wanted a prince of Saxe-Coburg-Gotha for the Spanish princess, and claimed that her future children with Montpensier would not be able to succeed to the French throne, due to the Treaty of Utrecht, wherein Montpensier's ancestor the Duke of Orleans renounced his rights to succeed to the Spanish throne for himself and his descendants. Louis Philippe opposed this interpretation and claimed that the only purpose of the Treaty of Utrecht was to keep France and Spain separate.

On 10 October 1846, Montpensier married Infanta Luisa, on the same day her sister Isabella II married Cádiz. However, the marriage of Isabella II produced many children. Montpensier funded the rebels, which helped to overthrow the government of his sister-in-law. However, the Cortes elected Amadeo of Savoy instead of him.

Montpensier was later reconciled to the restored Bourbons, and his daughter Mercedes of Orléans married Alfonso XII, son of Isabella II. Montpensier's son, Infante Antonio, successfully claimed the succession to the dukedom of Galliera, from which this branch takes its name.

== See also ==
- Princes of Orléans

== Notes ==
— Royal house — House of Orléans Cadet branch of the House of Bourbon Founding year: 1660
Preceded by House of Bourbon	Ruling House of France; 9 August 1830 – 24 February 1848	Monarchy abolished Second French Republic declared
