= Saint-Leu =

Saint-Leu may refer to several places in France:

- Saint-Leu, Réunion, Réunion department
- Saint-Leu-d'Esserent, Oise department
- Saint-Leu-la-Forêt, Val-d'Oise department
  - Castle of Saint-Leu
- Huby-Saint-Leu, Pas-de-Calais department
- Villers-sous-Saint-Leu, Oise department
