= Château de Neuilly =

Former French royal palace in Neuilly-sur-Seine, 1751–1848

Coordinates: 48.8900°N 2.2627°E

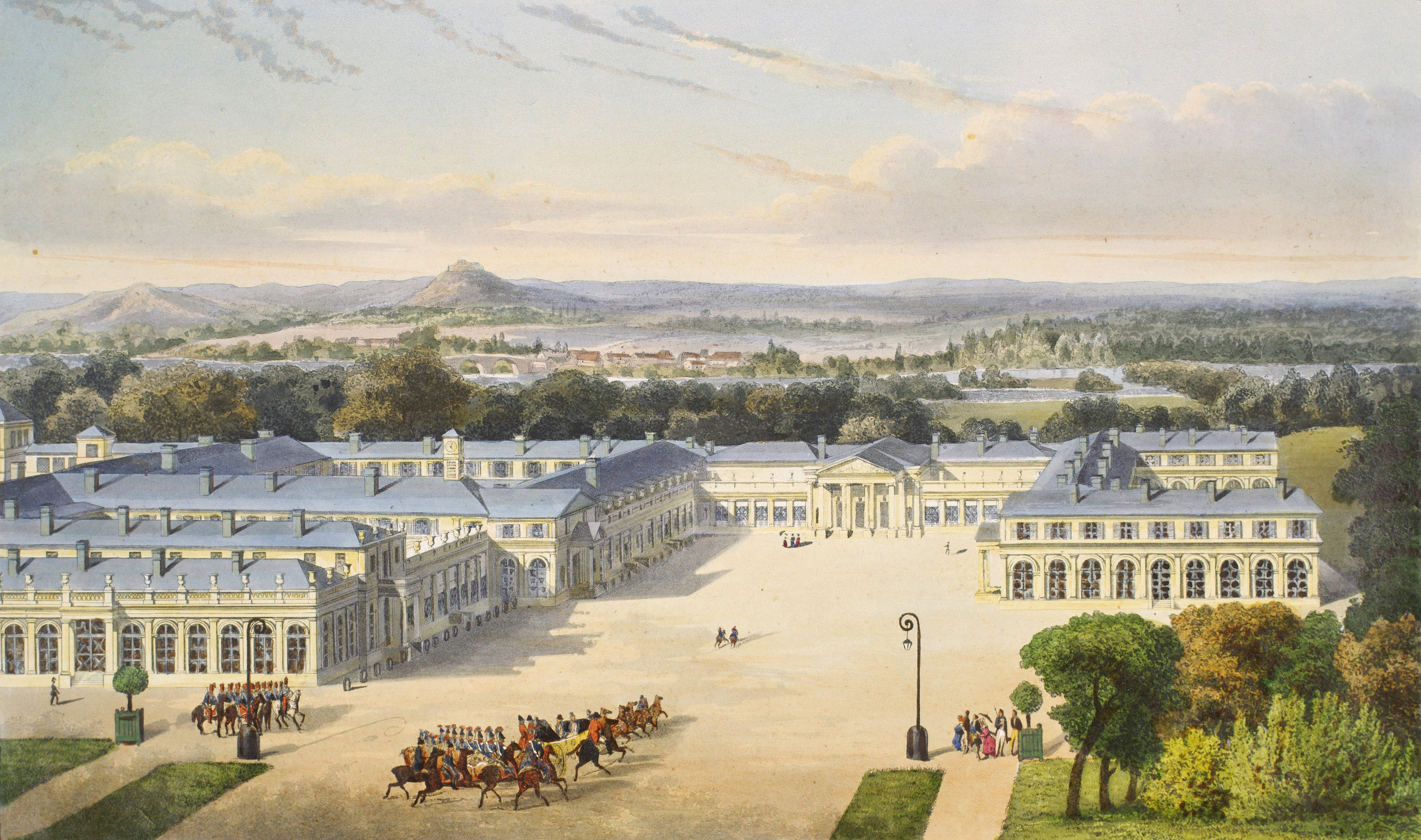
The entry of the Duke of Orléans at the Château de Neuilly in 1835

The château de Neuilly is a former château in Neuilly-sur-Seine, France. Its estate covered a vast 170-hectare park called "parc de Neuilly" which comprised all of Neuilly that is today to be found between avenue du Roule and the town of Levallois-Perret.

It was built in 1751. Acquired by the House of Orléans in 1819, the château was looted and burned during the French Revolution of 1848. In 1852 it was confiscated by Napoleon III along with other properties of the Orléans family, and the estate was subsequently subdivided from 1854 onwards.

Today, only one wing of the château survives. This section, designed in the 19th century by the architect Pierre-François-Léonard Fontaine, was later incorporated in 1908 into a convent complex built by Maurice Humbert for the Congregation of the Sisters of Saint Thomas of Villeneuve, located at 52, boulevard d'Argenson.

== History ==
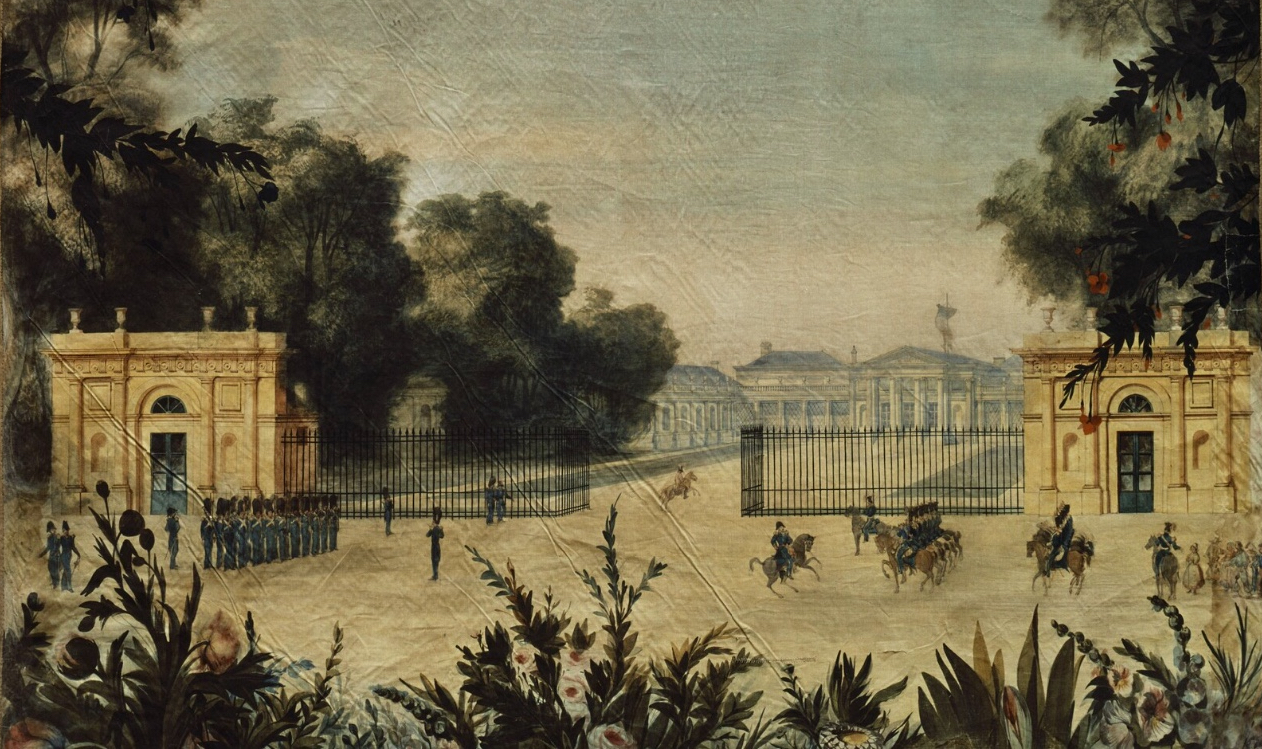
Soldiers marching in front of main entrance

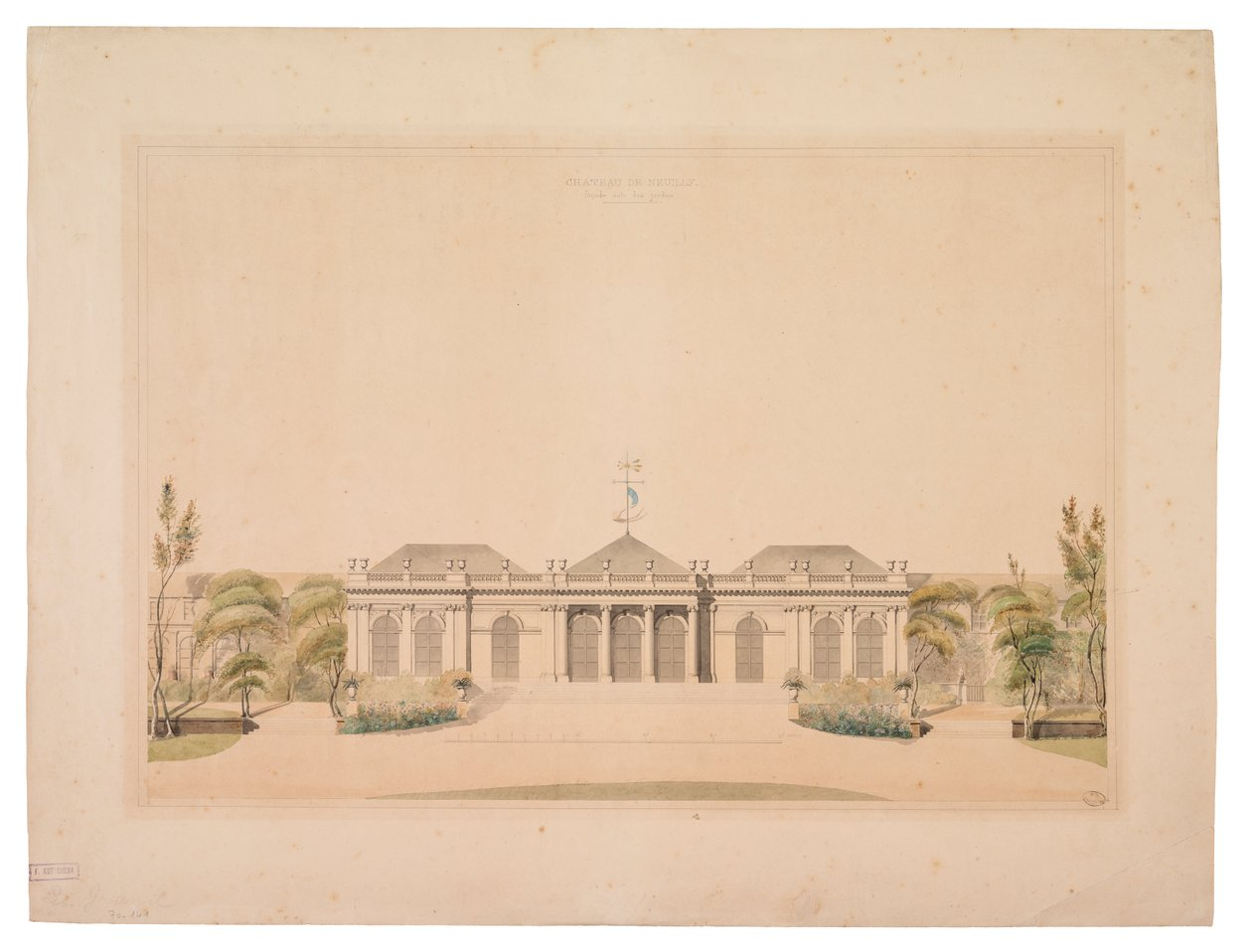
The facade was designed in the Ionic order

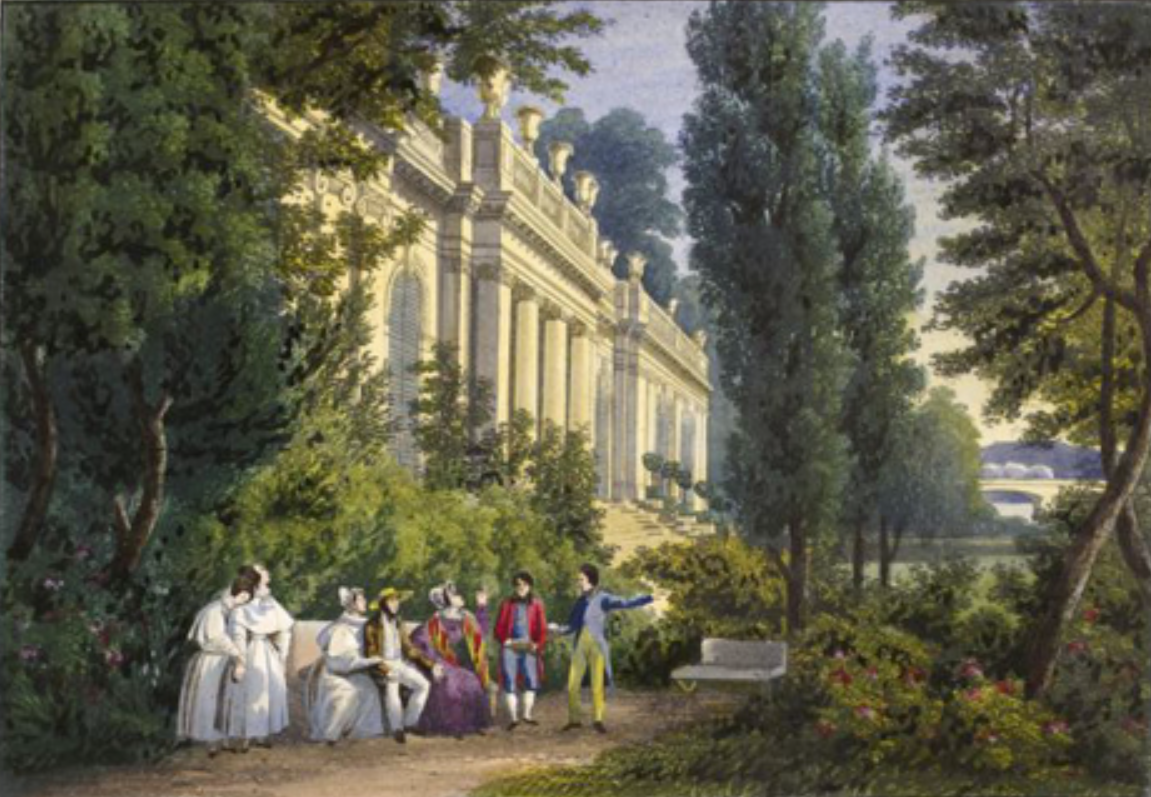
The chateau seen from the river side

=== The Ancien Regime ===
The parc was at some point divided into two very unequal parts, on which two châteaux were constructed:

- the château de Villiers to the east, seems to have only been a bourgeoise grande maison, despite having 24 rooms and a beautiful garden divided from the parc de Neuilly proper by a palisade. It was subsumed back into the parc in the first years of the 19th century;
- the château de Neuilly, to the west, was originally a construction probably dating from the second quarter of the 17th century. In 1668 it belonged to Louis de Béchameil, Marquis of Nointel, Superintendent of Finances to the Duke of Orléans and maître d'hôtel to Louis XIV.

==== 18th century ====
The Château de Neuilly was acquired in 1702 by M. de Sassenaye, who remained its owner until 11 July 1740, when it was sold to the Maréchale-Duchesse de Biron, born Marie-Antoinette de Bautru de Nogent (1662–1741), wife of Charles Armand de Gontaut-Biron. By a will dated 16 August 1740, she transferred the nue-propriété (bare ownership) of the estate to the Comte d'Argenson (1696–1764), Secretary of State for War to Louis XV, while granting the usufruct to M. de Villars.

Following the death of Villars in 1741, the Comte d'Argenson inherited full ownership upon the death of the Duchesse de Biron on 4 August 1741. Attracted by the château's privileged location overlooking the Seine, in 1751 he commissioned a new residence designed by the architect Jean-Sylvain Cartaud, assisted by François II Franque, his colleague at the Académie royale d'architecture, who later took over the project. The building was decorated with the Ionic order and constructed on a series of terraces overlooking the Seine.

At the Château de Neuilly, as at his Château des Ormes between Touraine and Poitou, the Comte d'Argenson hosted the philosophers Diderot, Voltaire, and Rousseau. In 1757, at the request of his rival Madame de Pompadour, he was disgraced and exiled to his estate at Les Ormes. He returned to Paris only in 1764, where he died shortly afterwards. He bequeathed the château to his friend Louis XV, who declined the gift.

His son and heir, the marquis Marc-René de Voyer de Paulmy d'Argenson, sold the Neuilly estate for 100,000 francs to the financier Radix de Sainte-Foy. At the beginning of 1792, Radix resold it for 370,000 francs to Madame de Montesson (1738–1806), the former morganatic wife of the Duke of Orléans, Louis-Philippe "le Gros".

=== French Revolution ===
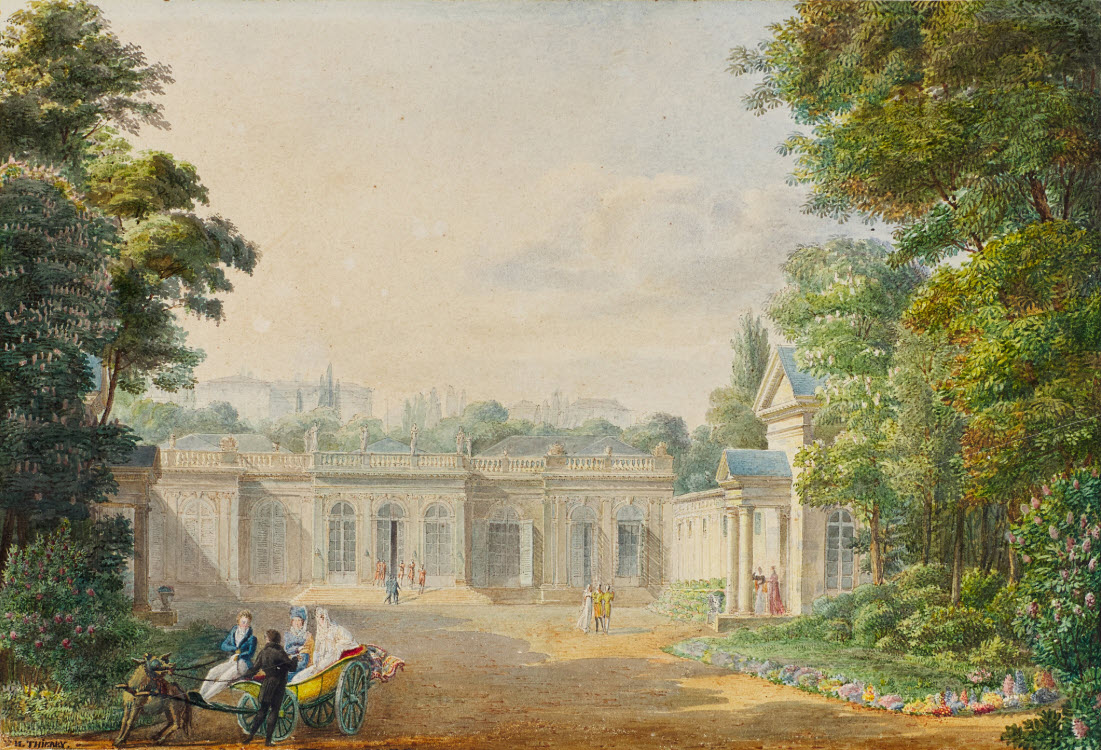
The entrance around 1796 by Hilaire Thierry

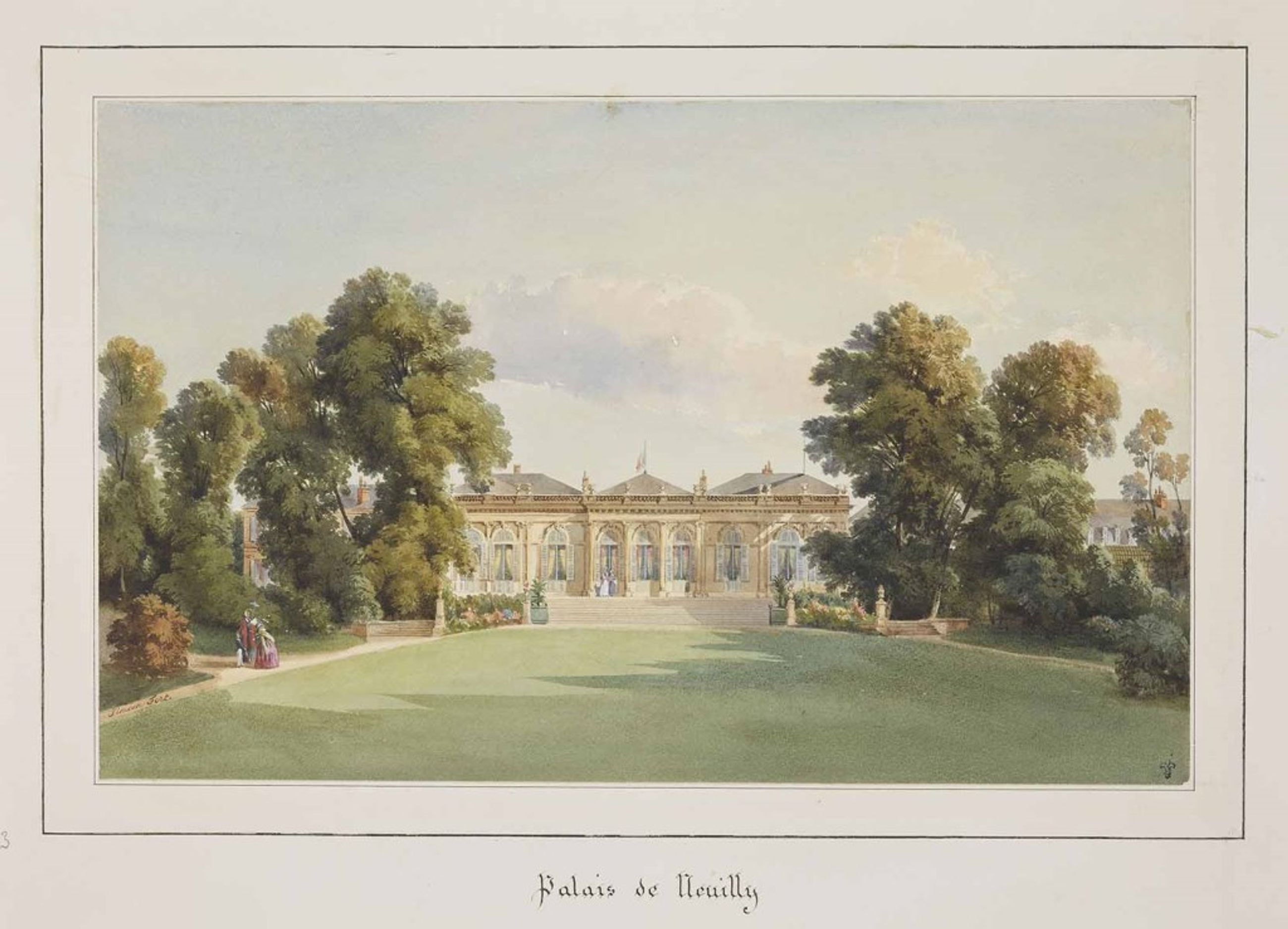
The garden facade of the Château de Neuilly

On 8 May 1794, Mme de Montesson sold the estate for 230,000 francs to the businessmen Delannoy and Ignace-Joseph Vanlerberghe, who rented it out as a secondary residence to Talleyrand. Talleyrand hosted magnificent festivities there, before the property was sold to Murat on 4 March 1804, for the same price of 230,000 francs it had cost ten years earlier.

Murat, who had also acquired the Château de Villiers from General Bessières, united the two estates by purchasing the lands of the plain of Villiers and the three major roads that lay between the boundaries of the two properties. Between 1804 and 1807 he undertook extensive works and enlargements, adding a left wing to the main château, along with a dining room and part of the right wing, while extending the garden façade; he also enlarged and replanted the park. At Neuilly, Murat hosted sumptuous festivities, such as those celebrating the coronation of Napoleon as King of Italy in 1805.

When Murat became King of Naples in 1808, all his properties were absorbed into the extraordinary domain of the Crown. The Princess Pauline Borghese, sister of the Emperor, received the estate as a dotation on 28 October 1808. However, the Château de Villiers was separated from it and loaned in the summer of 1809 to Prince Alexander Kurakin, ambassador of Russia, who came there to treat his gout. Princess Pauline undertook no works at Neuilly, which she disliked, judging it unhealthy; she repeatedly asked to exchange it for a property less close to Paris. In an effort to improve the site's sanitation, the Ponts et Chaussées in 1811 built an aqueduct beneath the bridge crossing the riverbank road, to drain stagnant waters from the lower section, which had formed a pond between the river and the Rue Basse de Longchamp.

=== The Restoration and the July Monarchy ===
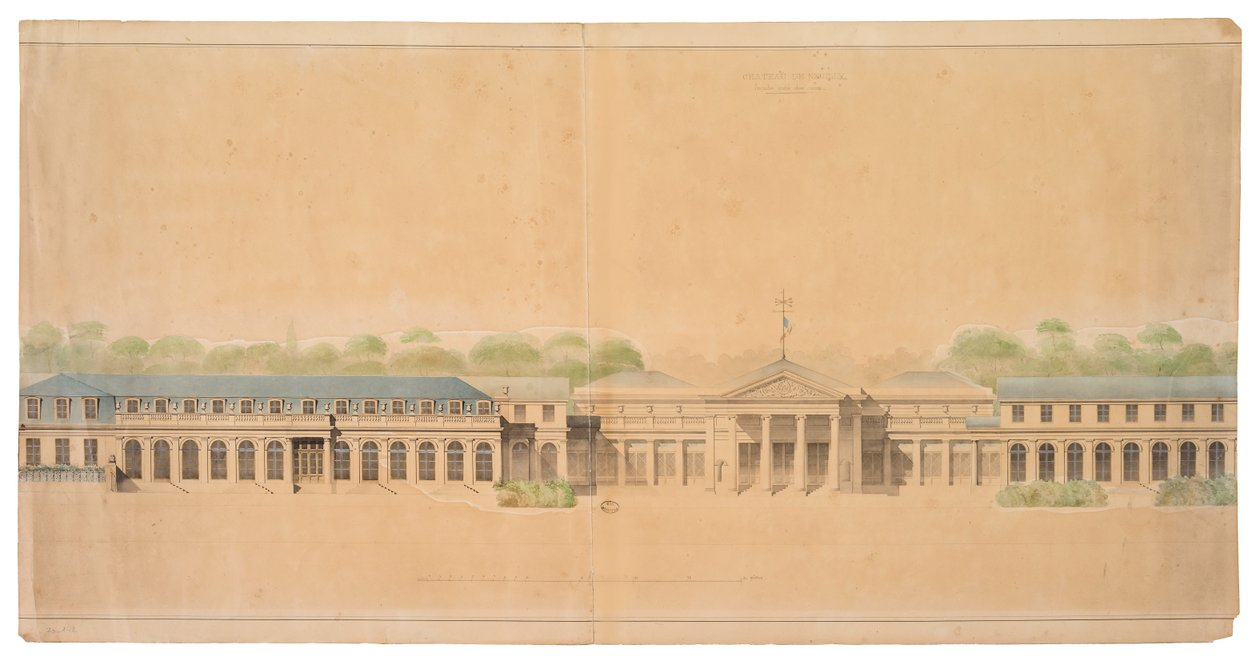
The facade of the Château de Neuilly

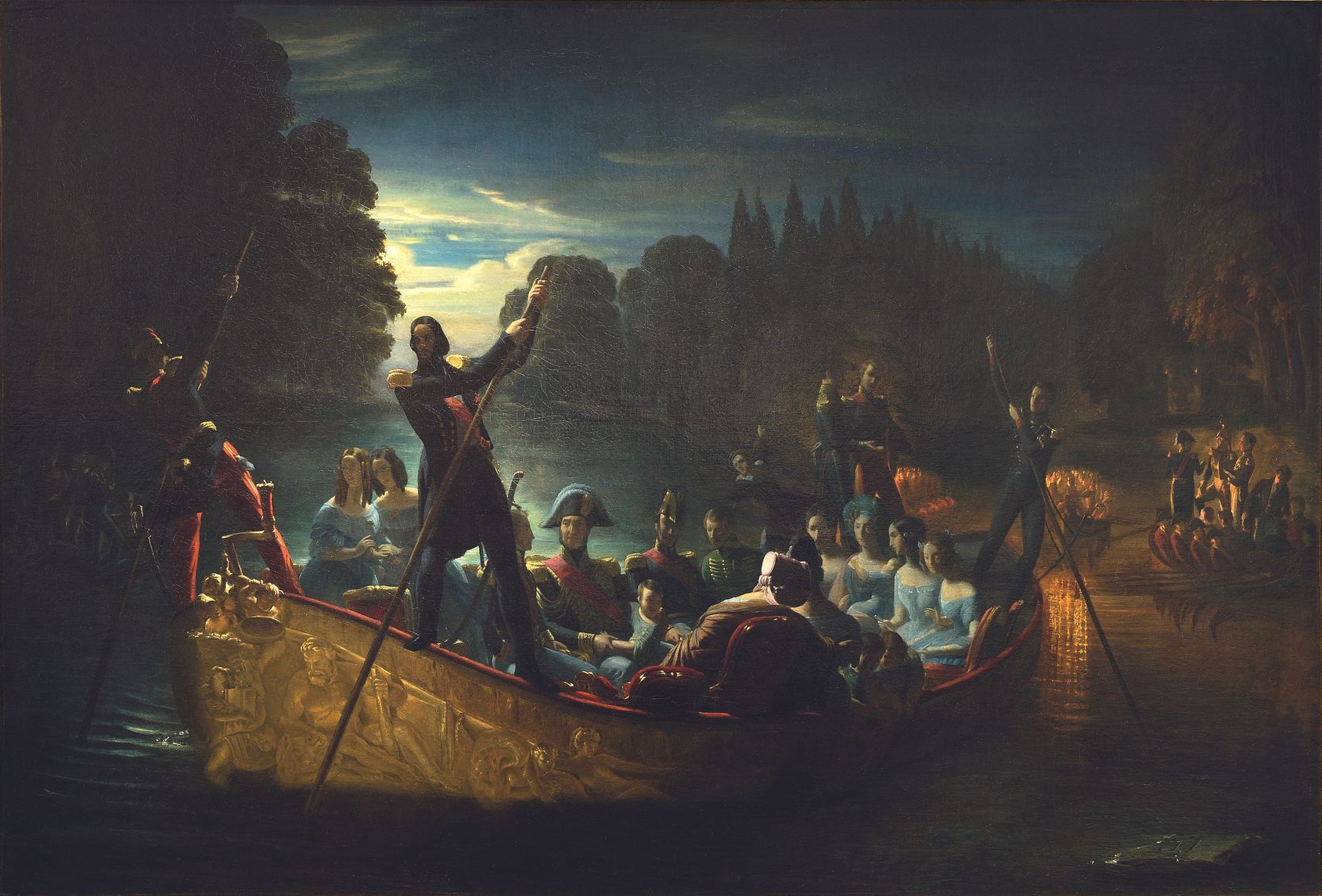
King Louis-Philippe returning by barge to the Château de Neuilly

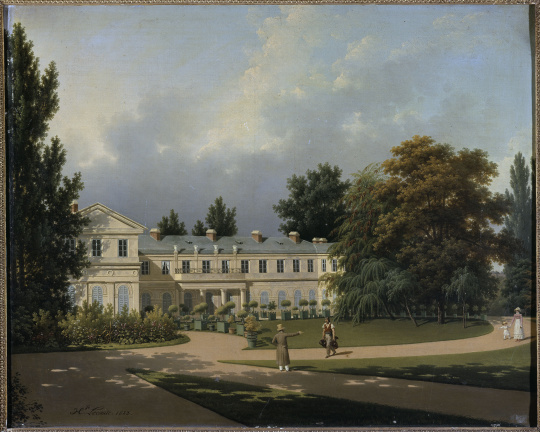
The Château seen from the garden

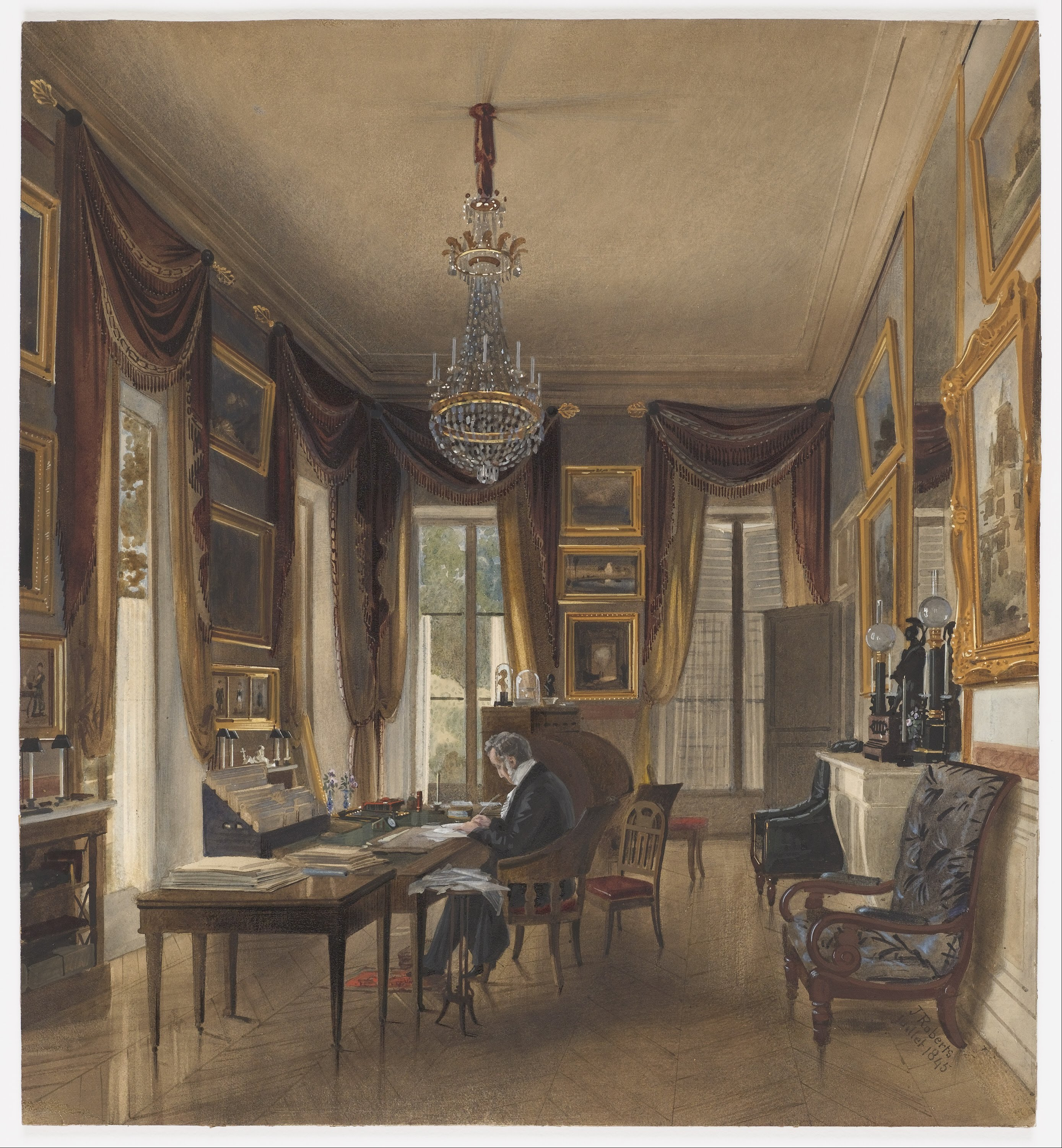
King Louis-Philippe at work in his study at Neuilly by Louis-Philippe Crépin

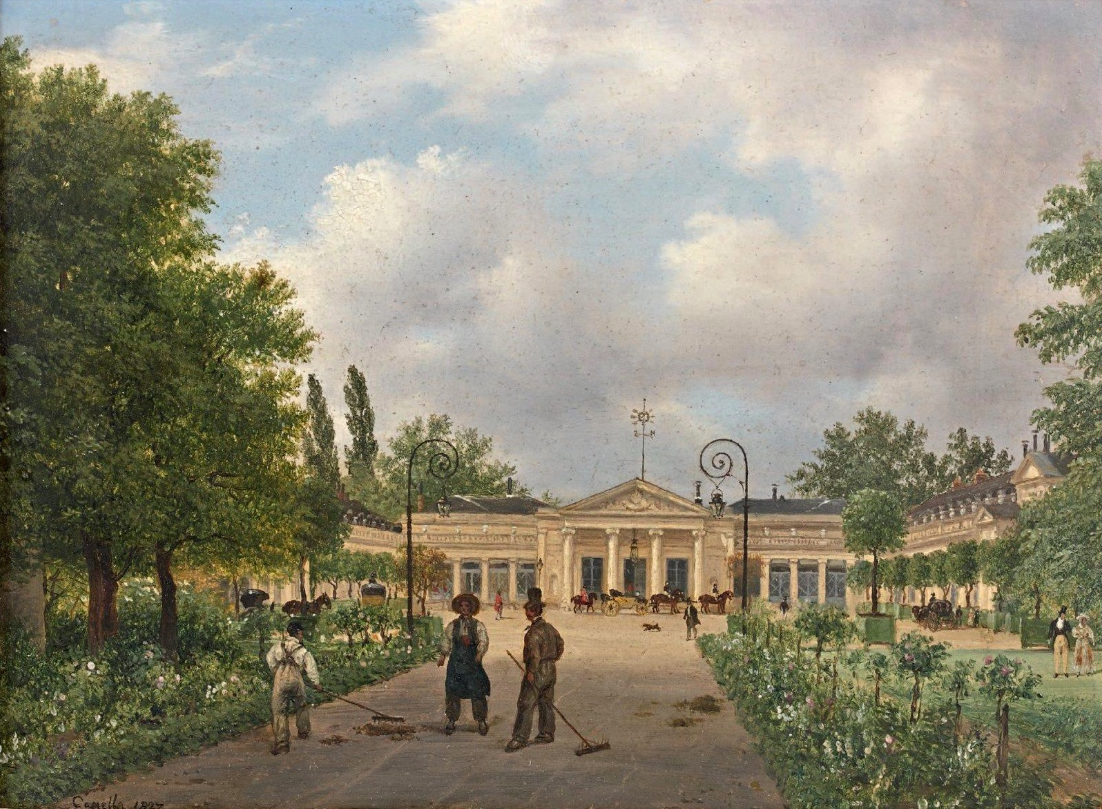
The Château de Neuilly around 1827, by the Italian painter Giuseppe Canella

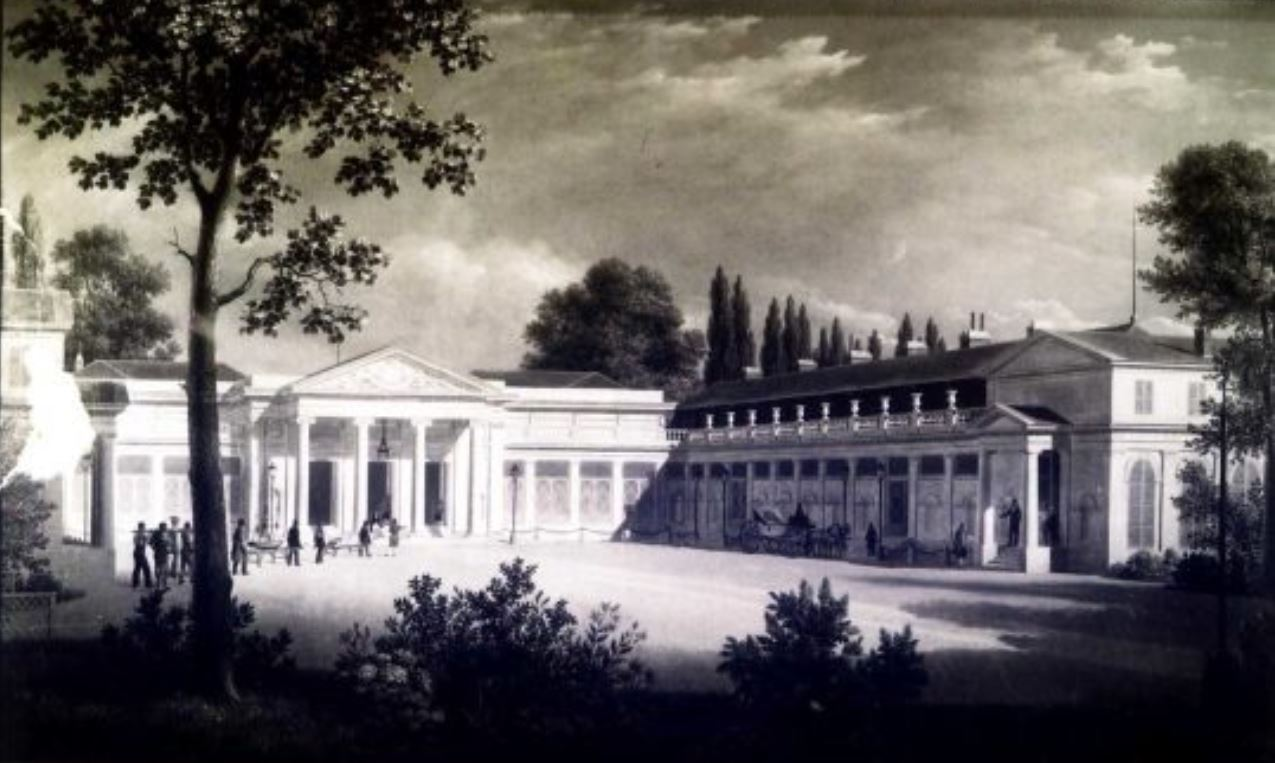
View of the Château de Neuilly by Louis-Philippe Crépin

In 1814, the estate reverted to the Crown. It was offered to the Duke of Angoulême, who declined it but accepted the Château de Villiers, of which he took possession on 18 November 1816 with the intention of creating a stud farm. Several projects were drawn up for this purpose, but none was ever carried out.

In 1818, the châteaux of Neuilly and Villiers were acquired by the Duke of Orléans, the future Louis-Philippe I of France, through an exchange with the so-called "stables of Chartres," located on the Rue Saint-Thomas-du-Louvre, which belonged to him but had been occupied by the royal stables since 1801. An appraisal by Domaines experts on 10 March 1818 estimated the Neuilly estate at 1,034,187 francs, compared with 1,184,353 for the Chartres stables. The Duke of Orléans immediately took possession of the château, where his wife gave birth to the Prince of Joinville on 14 August 1818.

The Duke of Orléans was seeking an estate close to Paris because his Château du Raincy had been destroyed in the years following the French Revolution. He considered the châteaux of Saint-Leu, Rosny-sur-Seine, Mortefontaine, and Ermenonville, among others. Through successive acquisitions, he enlarged the estate in order to isolate and fully open up the châteaux of Neuilly and Villiers. He acquired seven islets in the middle of the Seine, detached from the public river domain by an act of 30 October 1821, which he connected to the château by means of a wire suspension bridge built by the Séguin brothers. This allowed him to access the island now known as Île de la Jatte, where he relocated the "Temple of Love" that his father, Philippe Égalité, then Duke of Chartres, had erected in 1774 at the Parc Monceau (also called the "Folie de Chartres") in Paris.

Louis-Philippe had the Château de Neuilly transformed by Pierre-François-Léonard Fontaine. In 1820, the château's right wing was enlarged to house the apartments of the Duke of Orléans and of princess Adélaïde. In 1821, new kitchens were built and the Château de Villiers was restored. In 1822, the cellars under the dining room, the chapel, the servants' quarters, and the connection of the petit château to the main one were completed. The following year, the façade on the cour d'honneur and the two entrance pavilions were rebuilt. In 1824, the main entrance gate and its adjoining buildings, the dependencies of the Château de Villiers, and the boundary walls with their entryways around the park were constructed. In 1825–1826, the entrance and dependencies on Avenue Sainte-Foy, a heated greenhouse, and a covered riding arena were added. In 1828, the coach court with its dependencies and the temple of Diana in the park were completed. In 1829, the wing housing the apartments of the Duke of Orléans and the Duke of Nemours, along with the service buildings and their dependencies, was finished. In 1830–1831, new stables, a marble temple, grottos, guardhouses, and houses along Avenue Sainte-Foy were constructed.

The Orléans family was particularly fond of the Château de Neuilly, where they spent their summers. With its long, low buildings, it retained a discreet appearance well suited to the "bourgeois monarchy." The park, largely planted with tall timber, was enclosed by a high wall that shielded it from view.

=== The revolution of 1848 and after ===
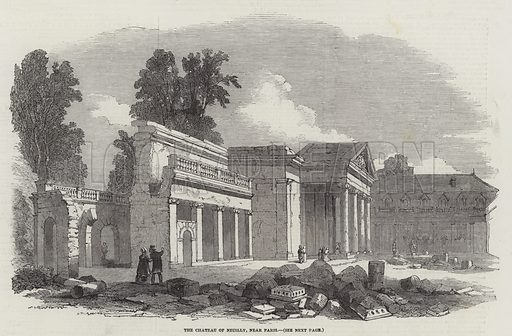
The Chateau de Neuilly in ruins. Illustration for The Illustrated London News, 17 April 1852.

During the Revolution of 1848, the château was burned and pillaged on 25 February 1848. Contemporary accounts describe a gruesome scene: after looters forced open the doors, some rushed into the apartments while others descended into the cellars, where they broke open casks of wine and rum. Soon drunk, around one hundred to one hundred and thirty men fought violently with bottles, before collapsing in a stupor. When the upper floors were set ablaze, the fire spread uncontrollably and the men trapped below perished, either consumed by the flames or suffocated by smoke. The following day, between 120 and 130 bodies were reportedly recovered from the cellars, many bearing visible injuries from the struggle.

Confiscated by Napoleon III in 1852 along with the Orléans family estates, the park was divided into 700 plots ("lotissement du Parc"). After the creation of seven boulevards, each 30 metres wide, the plots were sold at successive public auctions beginning in 1854.

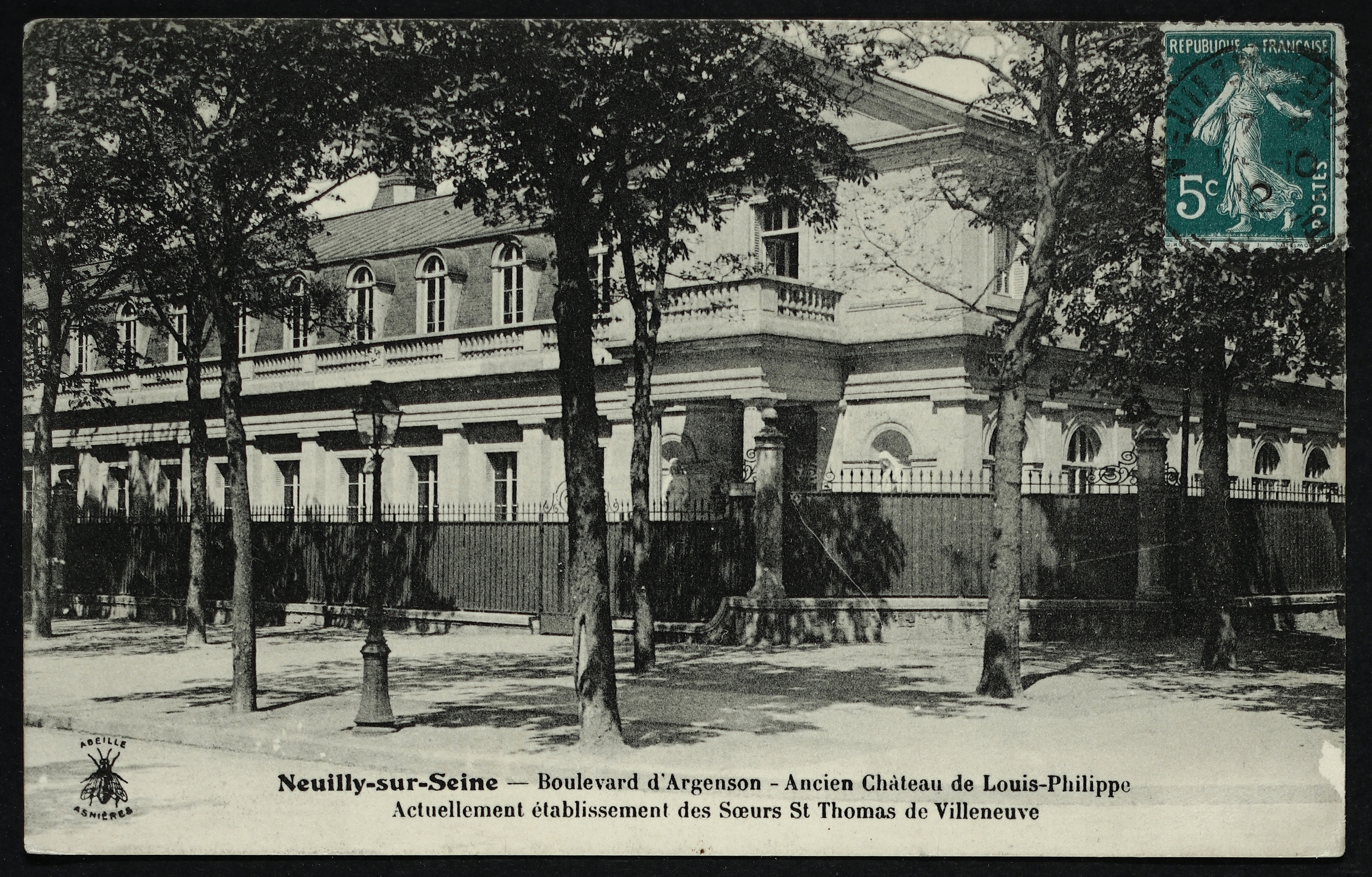
The remaining wing of the Château de Neuilly

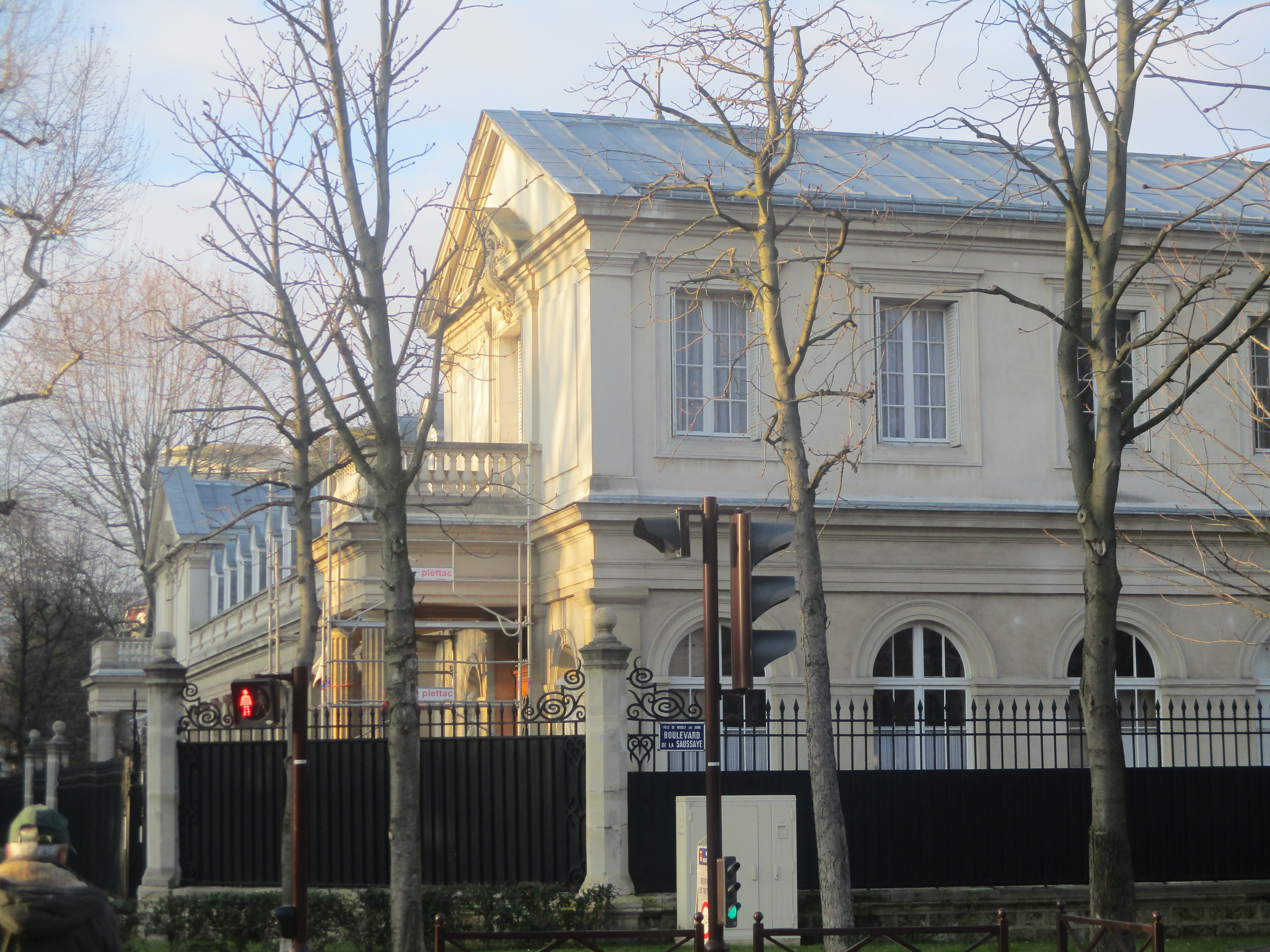
The remaining wing in 2018

Only one of the wings built by Murat survived, known as the wing of Adélaïde d'Orléans, which formed part of Fontaine's constructions. From 1863 to 1874 it housed the Notre-Dame-des-Arts boarding school, and from 1874 to 1907 a workhouse for poor young girls directed by Mlle Glaudel.

In 1907, the Congregation of the Sisters of Saint Thomas of Villeneuve purchased the property following their expropriation from their house on the Rue de Sèvres in Paris. The sisters entrusted the architect Maurice Humbert with restoring the buildings and constructing their new convent in harmony with the surviving wing. They settled there on 23 September 1908 and commissioned Maurice Humbert to build a chapel, the Chapel of Notre-Dame-de-Bonne-Délivrance. This chapel was consecrated on 22 June 1910 and houses the statue of Notre-Dame-de-Bonne-Délivrance, known as the "[Black Madonna of Paris|Black Virgin of Paris]".

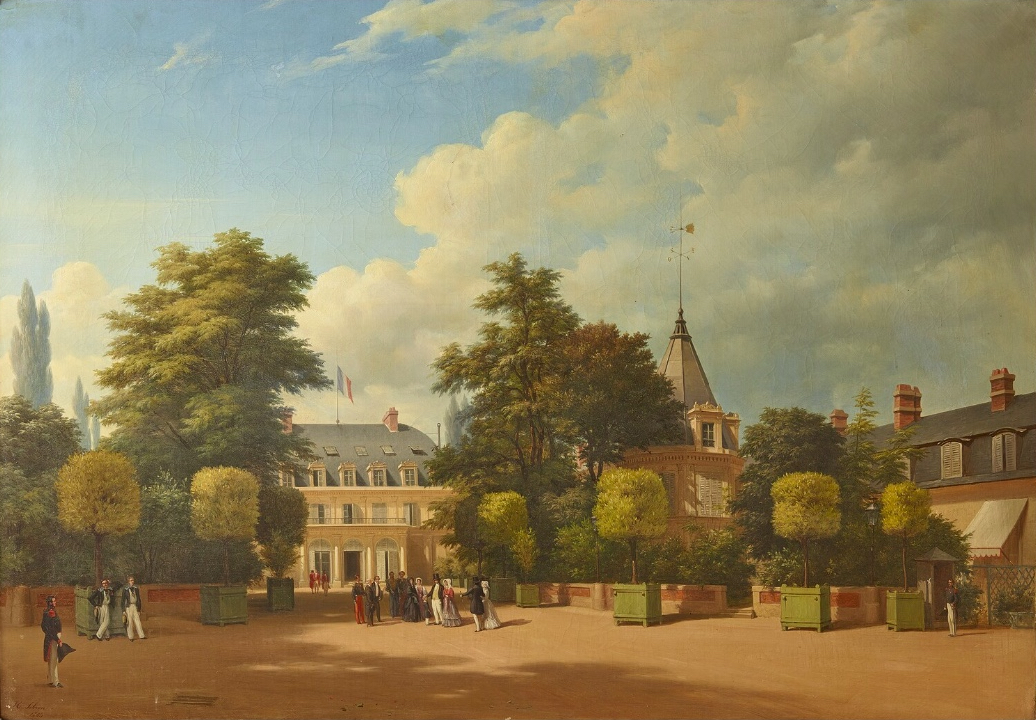
View of the Petit Château by Hippolyte Sebron

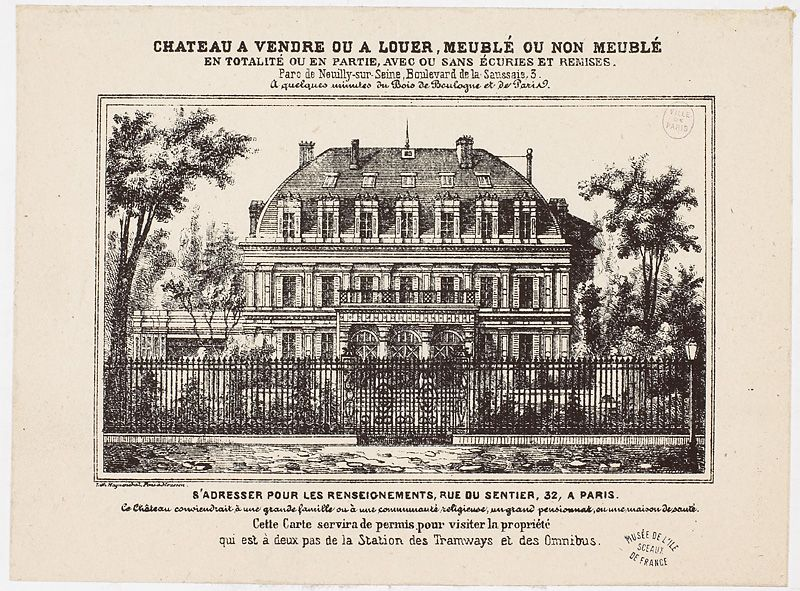
Sales advertisement for the Petit Château(second half 19th century)

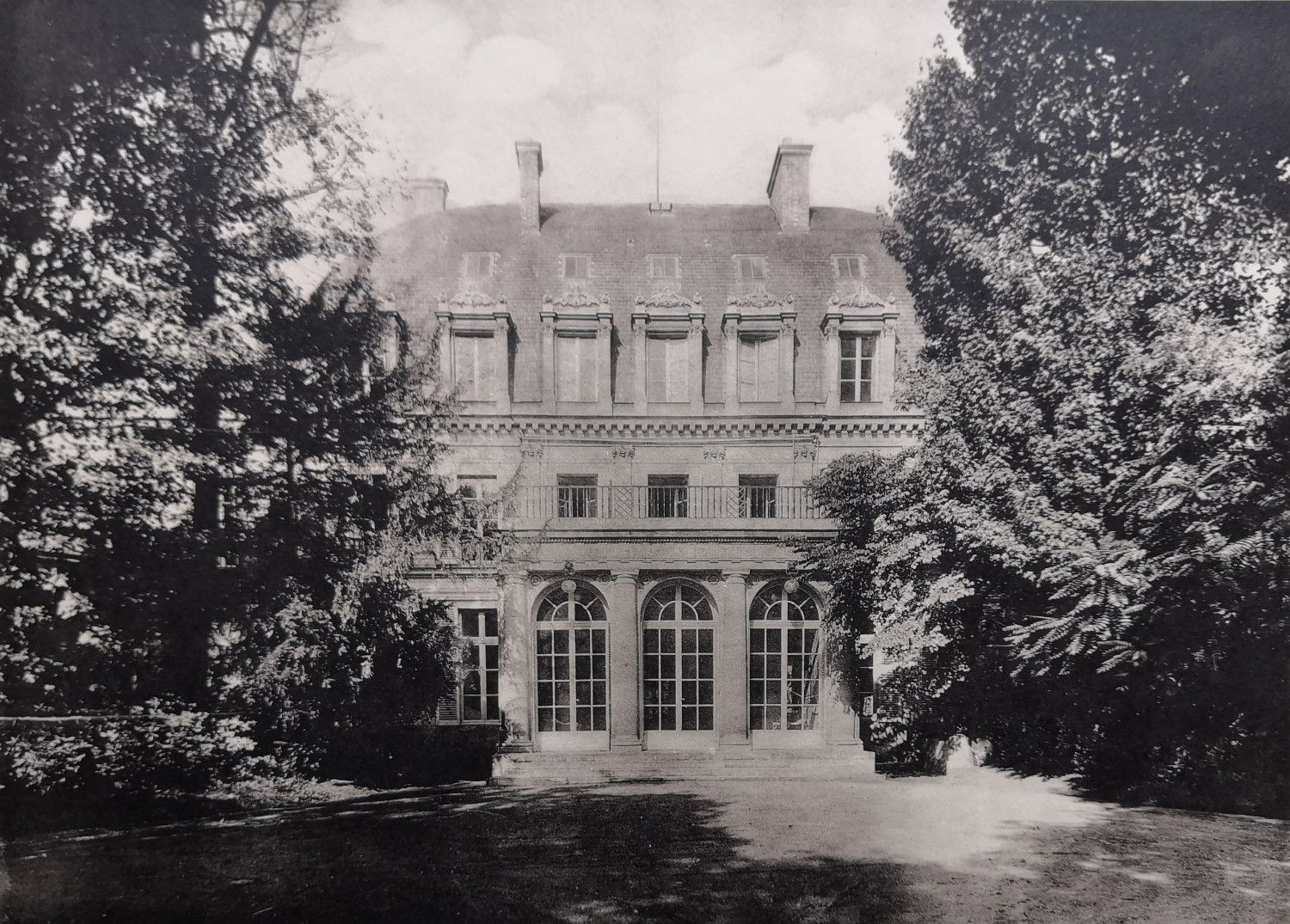
Front facade

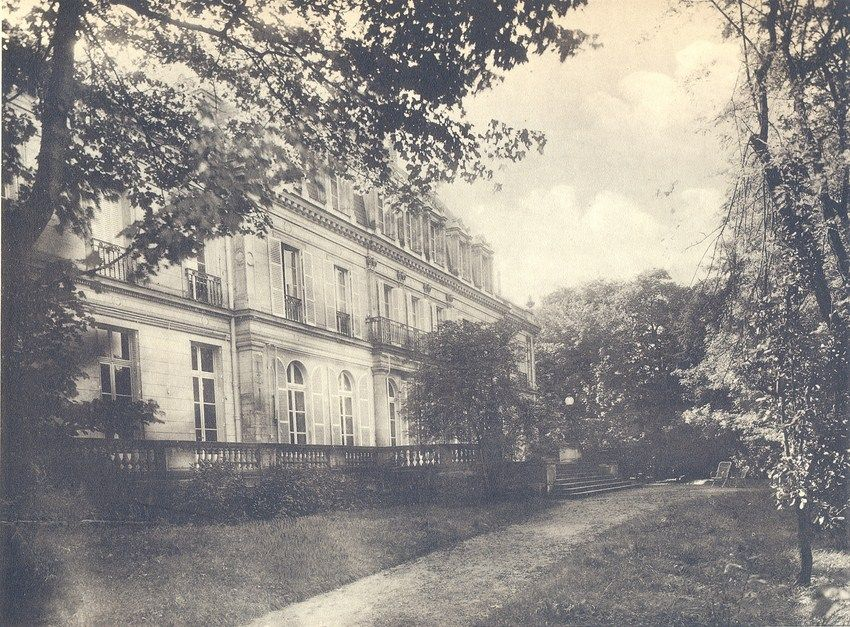
Garden facade

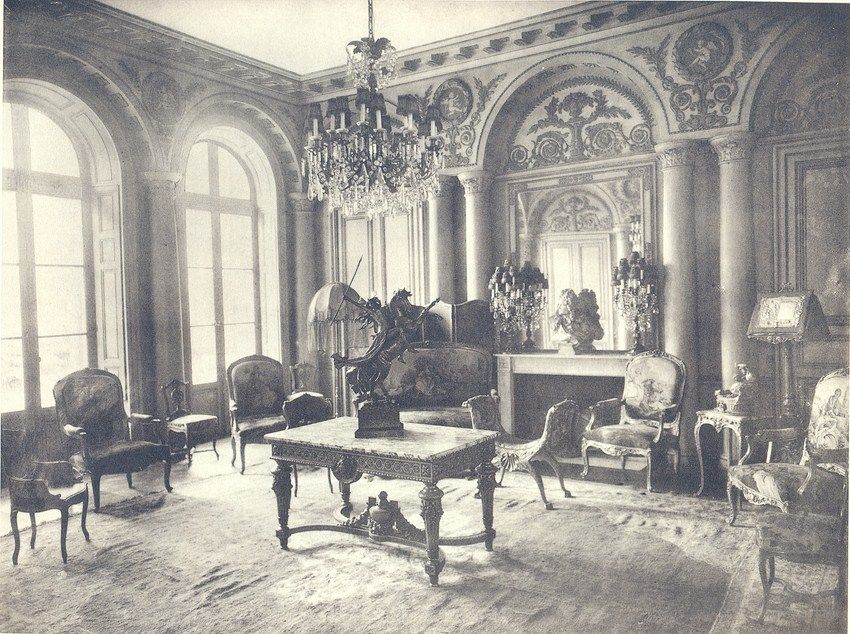
The grand salon in the Petit Château

== Comparable residences ==
The Château de Neuilly belonged to a broader tradition of 18th- and early 19th-century suburban residences situated near major capitals, combining neoclassical architecture with extensive landscaped parks. Other estates of similar character include:

- the Château de Bagatelle in the Bois de Boulogne, built for the Comte d'Artois in 1777, noted for its neoclassical design and ornamental gardens;
- the Parc Monceau in Paris, created by Philippe d'Orléans, known as the "Folie de Chartres," with follies and garden temples, one of which (the Temple of Love) was later relocated to Neuilly;
- the Château de Saint-Cloud, a royal residence near Paris, also favored by the Orléans family and destroyed in the 19th century;
- the Château de Malmaison at Rueil, acquired by Joséphine de Beauharnais, which likewise combined a neoclassical residence with landscaped grounds.

Beyond France, parallels can be drawn with other royal suburban villas of the period, such as Sanssouci in Potsdam, the Laxenburg castles near Vienna, the Villa Reale di Monza in Lombardy.

Under the Orléans, Neuilly embodied the discreet style associated with the so-called "bourgeois monarchy": its long, low façades and secluded park offered an understated alternative to the ostentation of Versailles or Saint-Cloud, much as Malmaison or Bagatelle had symbolized more private, intimate royal and princely lifestyles in the late 18th and early 19th centuries.

== Sources ==
- Fontaine, Pierre François Léonard (1836), Château de Neuilly. Domaine privé du roi (in French), Paris: Imprimerie de Pihan Delaforest (Morinval)

== Gallery: Plans and maps of the Château de Neuilly ==
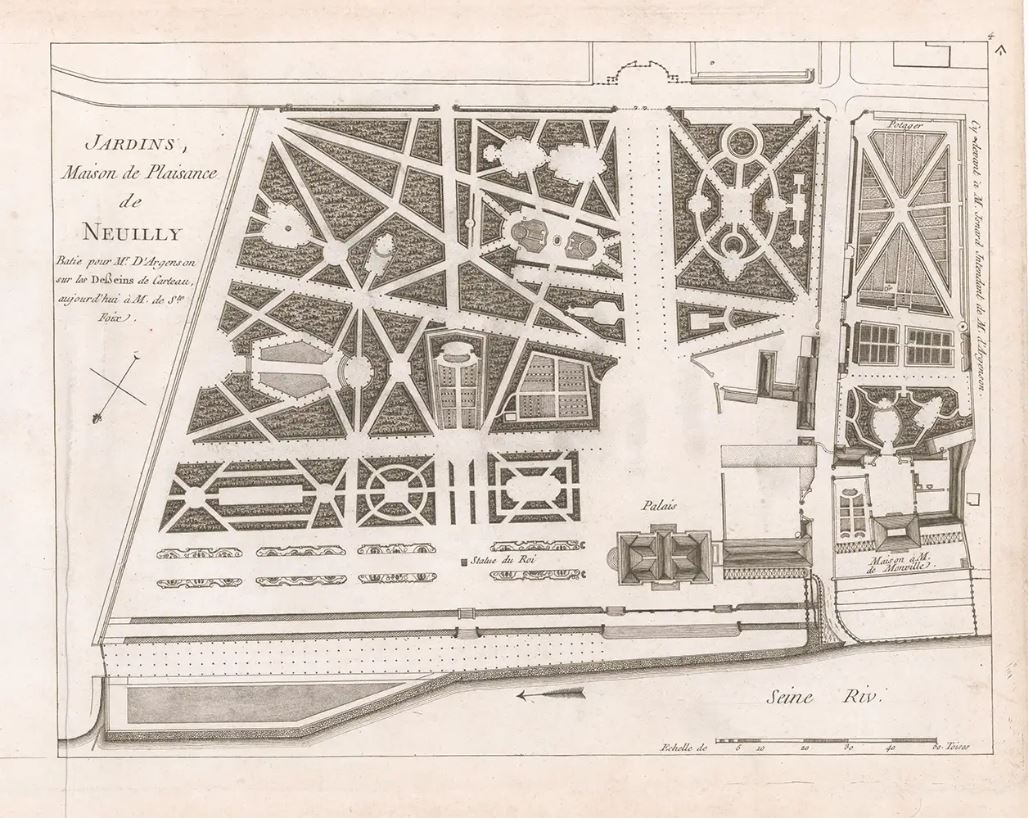
Plan of the Château de Neuilly at the end of the 18th century by George Louise le Rouge (between 1776 and 1788)

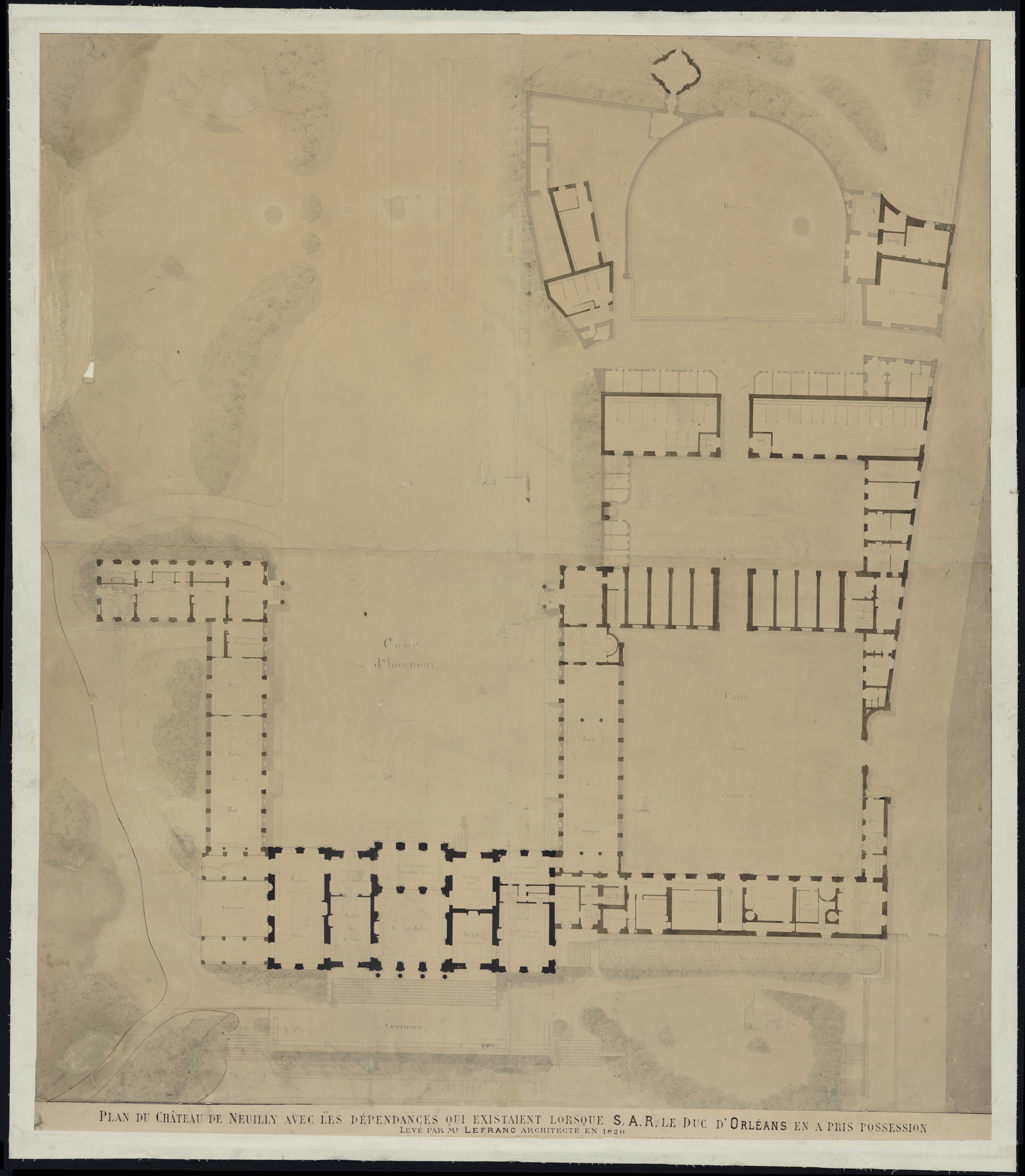
Plan of the Château de Neuilly when Louis-Philippe I acquired the château. The plan clearly shows the extensions that Murat made to the palace.

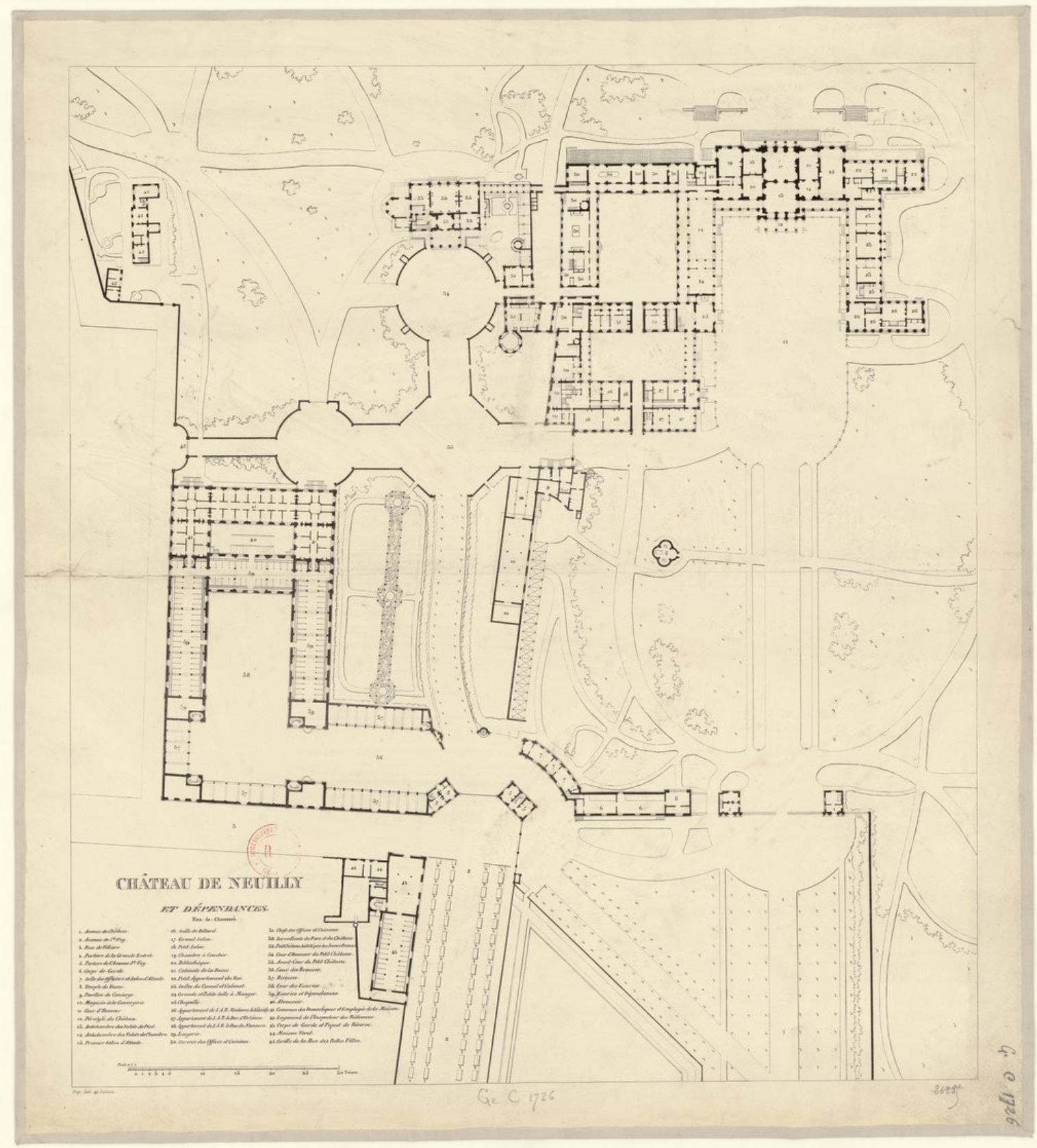
Plan of the Château de Neuilly and its direct surroundings

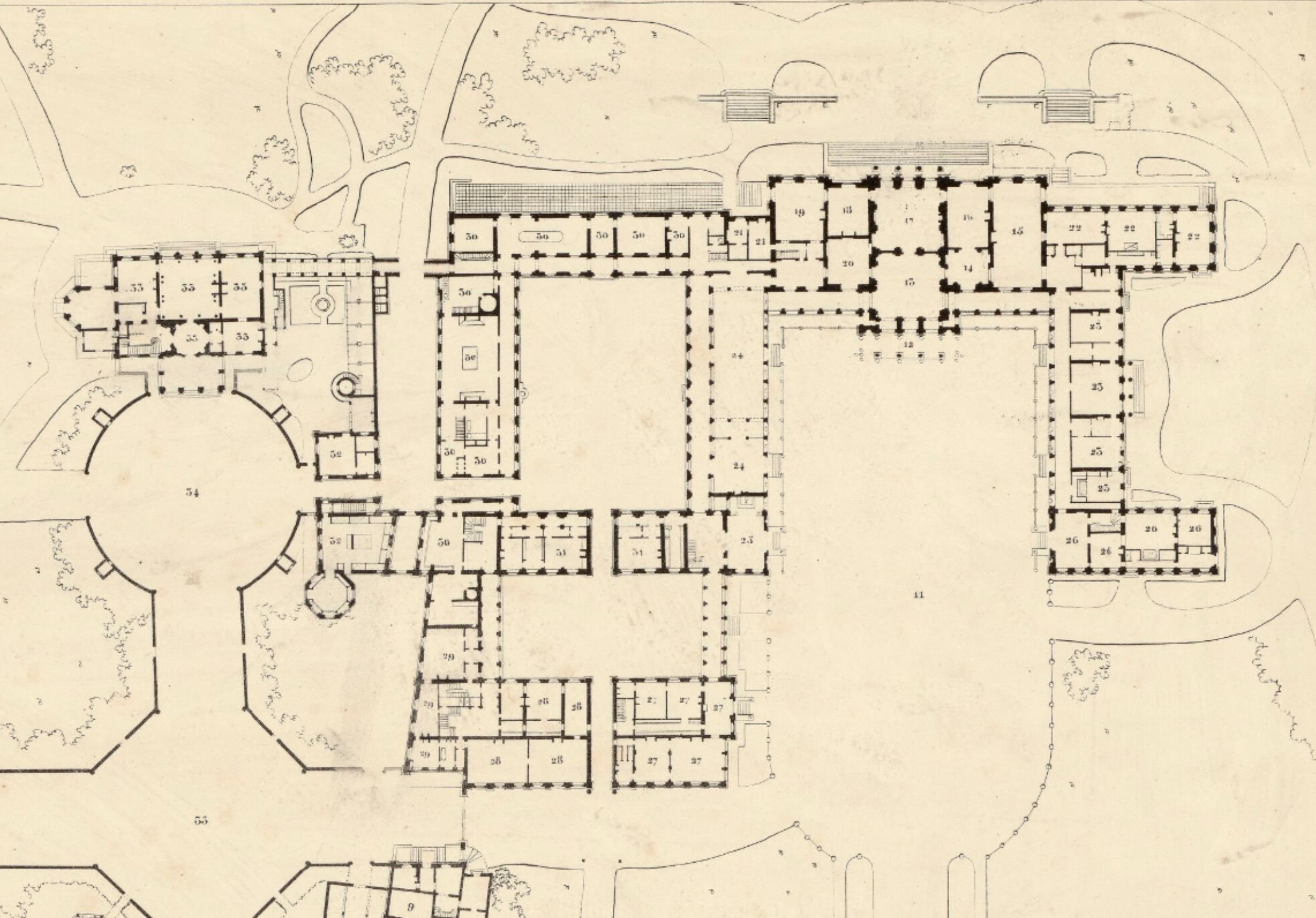
Floorplan of the Château de Neuilly

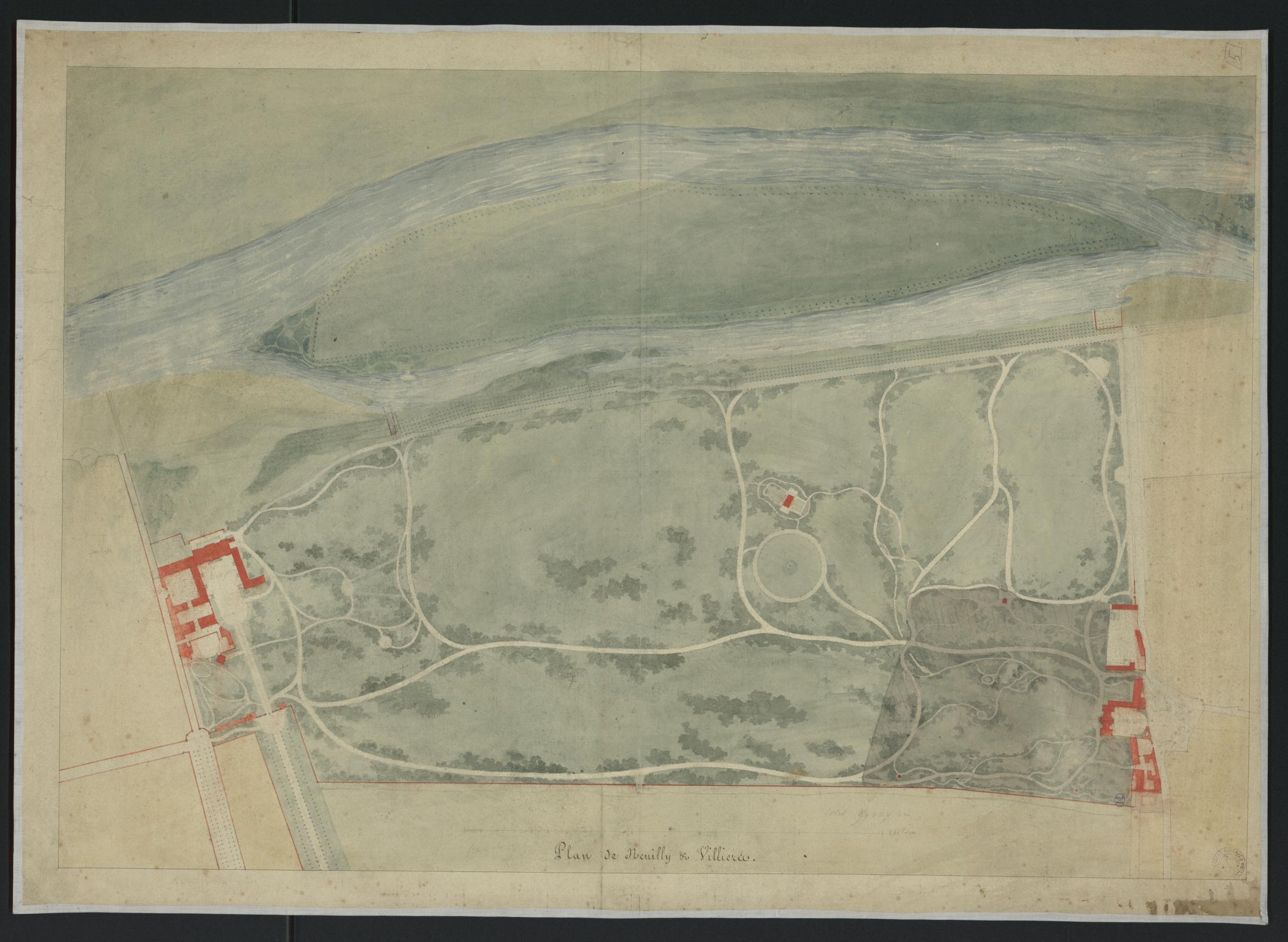
Plan of the palace gardens (1817) - The château de Neuilly can be seen on the left, and the château de Villiers on the right

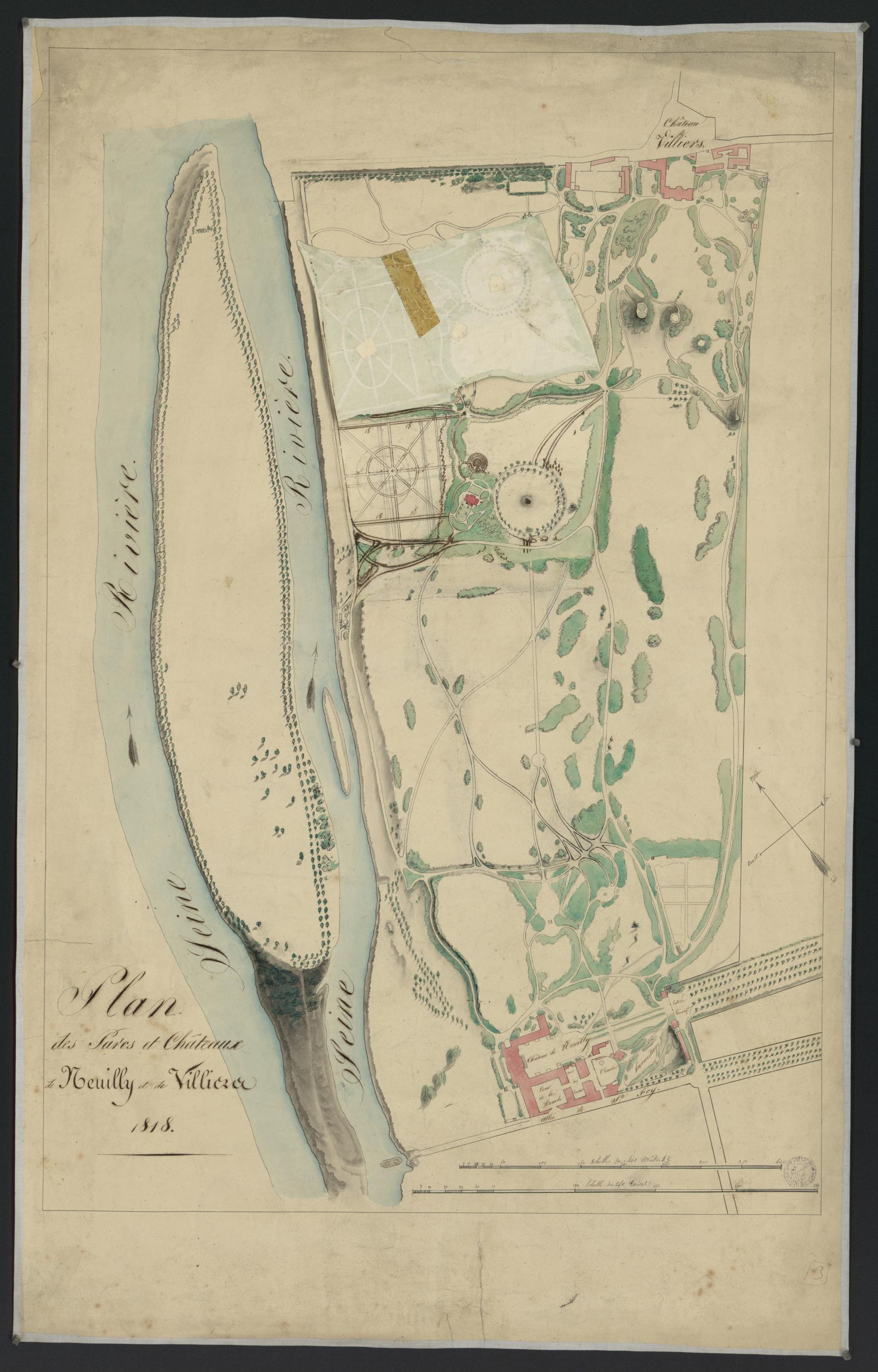
Plan of the palace gardens (1818)

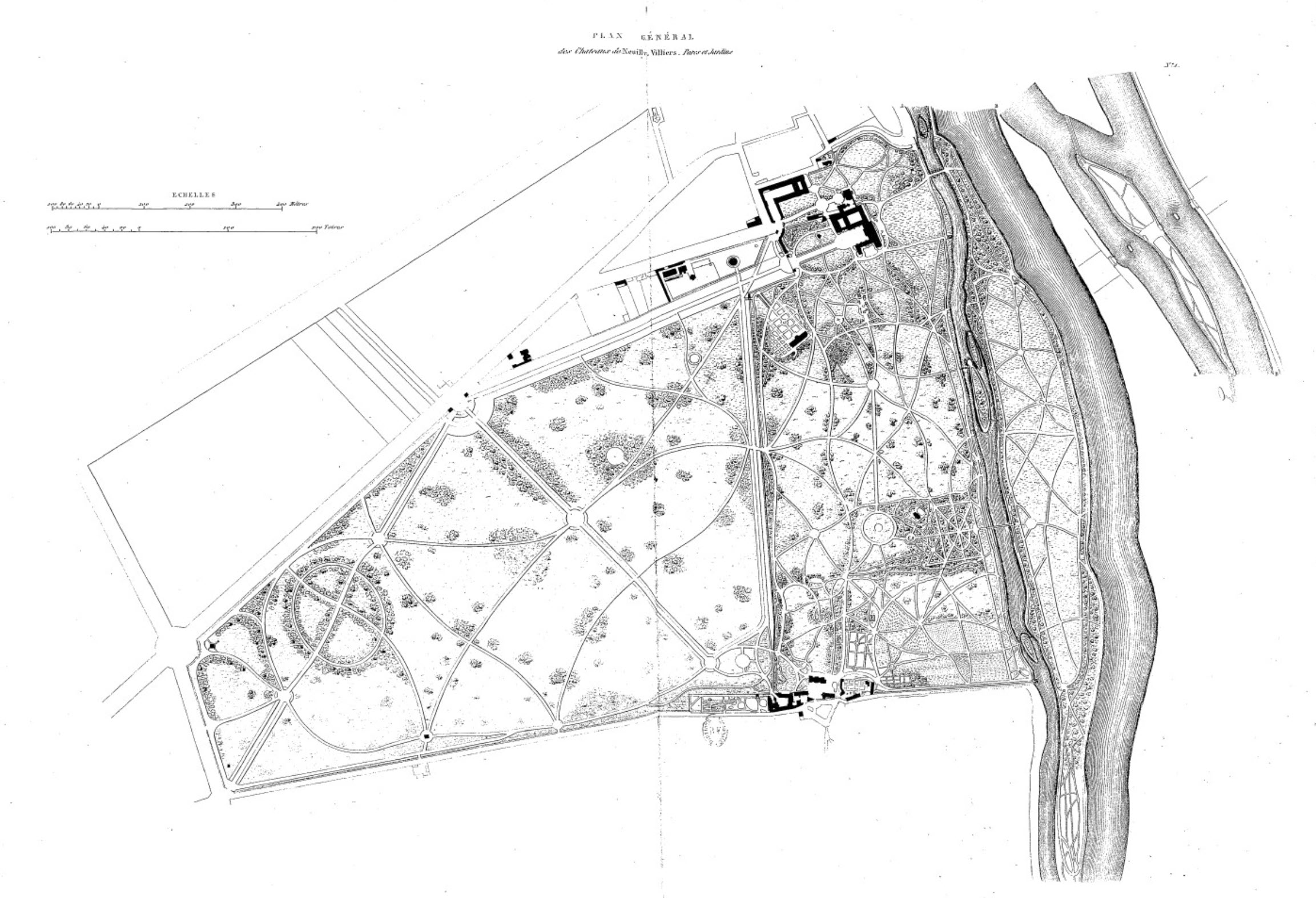
Plan of the palace gardens by Pierre Fontaine (1836)

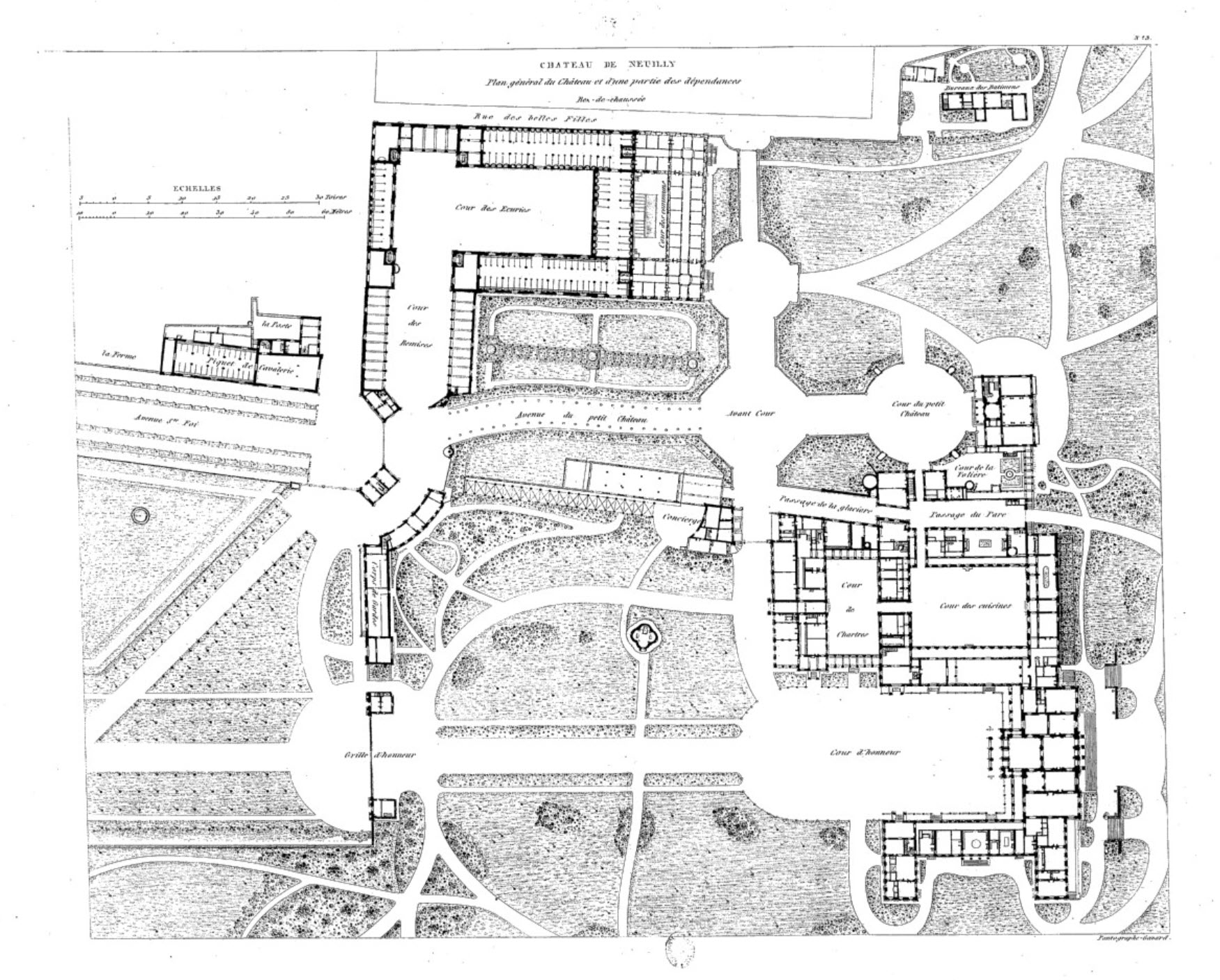
Floor plan of the château by Pierre Fontaine (1836)
