= Goods of the House of Orléans =

Reassignment of royal land and titles in 17th- and 18th-century France

Under the Ancien Régime, the goods of the House of Orléans (biens de la maison d'Orléans) comprised two distinct parts : the apanage and the "biens patrimoniaux".

== Ancien Regime ==
=== The Apanage d'Orléans ===
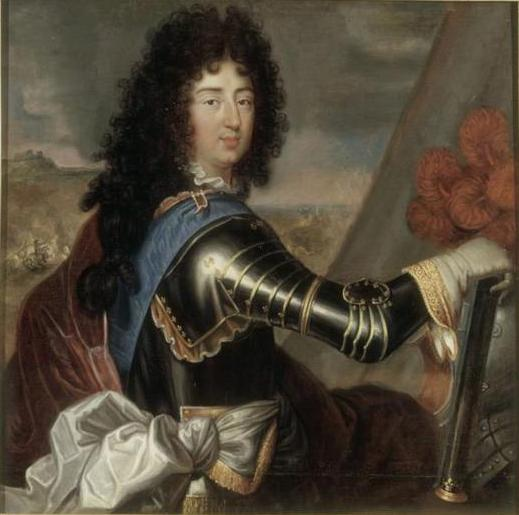
Philippe-de-France wearing fleur-de-lys armor and the Cordon Bleu de l’Ordre du Saint-Esprit.

The apanage of Orléans was originally formed by Louis XIII for his brother Gaston who died without male heirs in 1660. The apanage then reverted to the French crown. In 1661 Louis XIV ceded it to his brother Philippe. Originally it comprised the duchies of Orléans, Valois and Chartres, as well as the seigneurie of Montargis. Over time it expanded to include the following territories

- In 1672, Louis XIV added the Duchy of Nemours, the counties of Dourdan and Romorantin, and the marquisats of Coucy and Folembray.
- In 1692, the Palais-Royal was incorporated into the apanage in protest of the clause in Cardinal Richelieu’s will bequeathing it solely for the king's use.
- In 1740, Louis XV added the hôtel de Grand-Ferrare in Fontainebleau.
- In 1751, the county of Soissons was added.
- In 1766, La Fère, Marle, Ham, Saint-Gobain, canal de l'Ourcq, and Résidence Châtillon in Paris were included

=== The "biens patrimoniaux" ===
The "biens patrimoniaux" had varied origins:

- Inheritance from the Grande Mademoiselle in 1693 : The Grande Mademoiselle made her cousin Monsieur her sole heir. Upon her death, Monsieur obtained the duchies of Montpensier and Châtellerault, the marquisat of Mézières-en-Brenne, the counties of Mortain, Bar-sur-Seine, the vicomtés of Auge and Domfront, the baronnie of Beaujolais and the principality of Joinville.
- In 1742, the dowry of four million livres from Louise-Elisabeth of Orléans, daughter of Philippe II, Duc d’Orléans, the Regent, who had married Louis I of Spain, was wholly returned to the Orléans family who had only paid for half of it.
- The famous Orléans Collection of art, mostly curated by Philippe, was sold during the Revolution by Louis-Philippe d'Orléans (1747-1793).
- Inheritance from the Louis Jean Marie de Bourbon, duc de Penthièvre, who died in 1793, and whose daughter, Louise Marie Adélaïde de Bourbon, had married Louis-Philippe d'Orléans.

=== Purchases ===
Revenue earned from the apanages, the "biens patrimoniaux", as well as the monies raised in the roles and offices taken by members of the house of Orléans, allowed them to purchase more land and châteaux :

- the château de Saint-Cloud, bought by Monsieur in 1658 for 240,000 livres, and considerably extended and transformed. Duke Louis Philippe, who had deserted Saint-Cloud after his morganatic marriage to Madame de Montesson, was forced to cede it to Louis XVI for six million livres, of which four were raised through debts owed to the Duc and the remainder by refunding 100,000 of the 400,000 livres of rents formed by the duke of Orléans for his son at the time of his marriage. The sale concluded on 24 October 1784.
- the château de Bagnolet, bought in 1719 by the Regent and re-sold in 1769 by Louis Philippe d'Orléans (1725-1785).
- the château du Raincy, bought by Louis Philippe d'Orléans (1725-1785) in 1769.
- the château de Maison-Rouge à Gagny, bought in 1771 from the Marquis-de-Montfermeil by Louis Philippe d'Orléans (1747-1793). Confiscated as state property, bought in 1816 by Nicolas Charles Legrand, whose heirs sold it for 60,000 francs to Louis-Philippe I on 29 December 1845.
- the Château de Sainte-Assise at Seine-Port was given as a present by Louis Philippe d'Orléans, Duke of Orléans, to his morganatic wife, Madame de Montesson. After his death, she sold it to the Count of Provence (the future Louis XVIII), in 1787.
- the château de Saint-Leu, bought in 1780 by Louis Philippe d'Orléans (1747-1793).
- the Folie-de-Chartres created by Louis Philippe d'Orléans (1747-1793), the precursor to today's Parc Monceau in Paris.

== The Goods under the July Monarchy ==
=== The act of donation-partage of 7 August 1830 ===
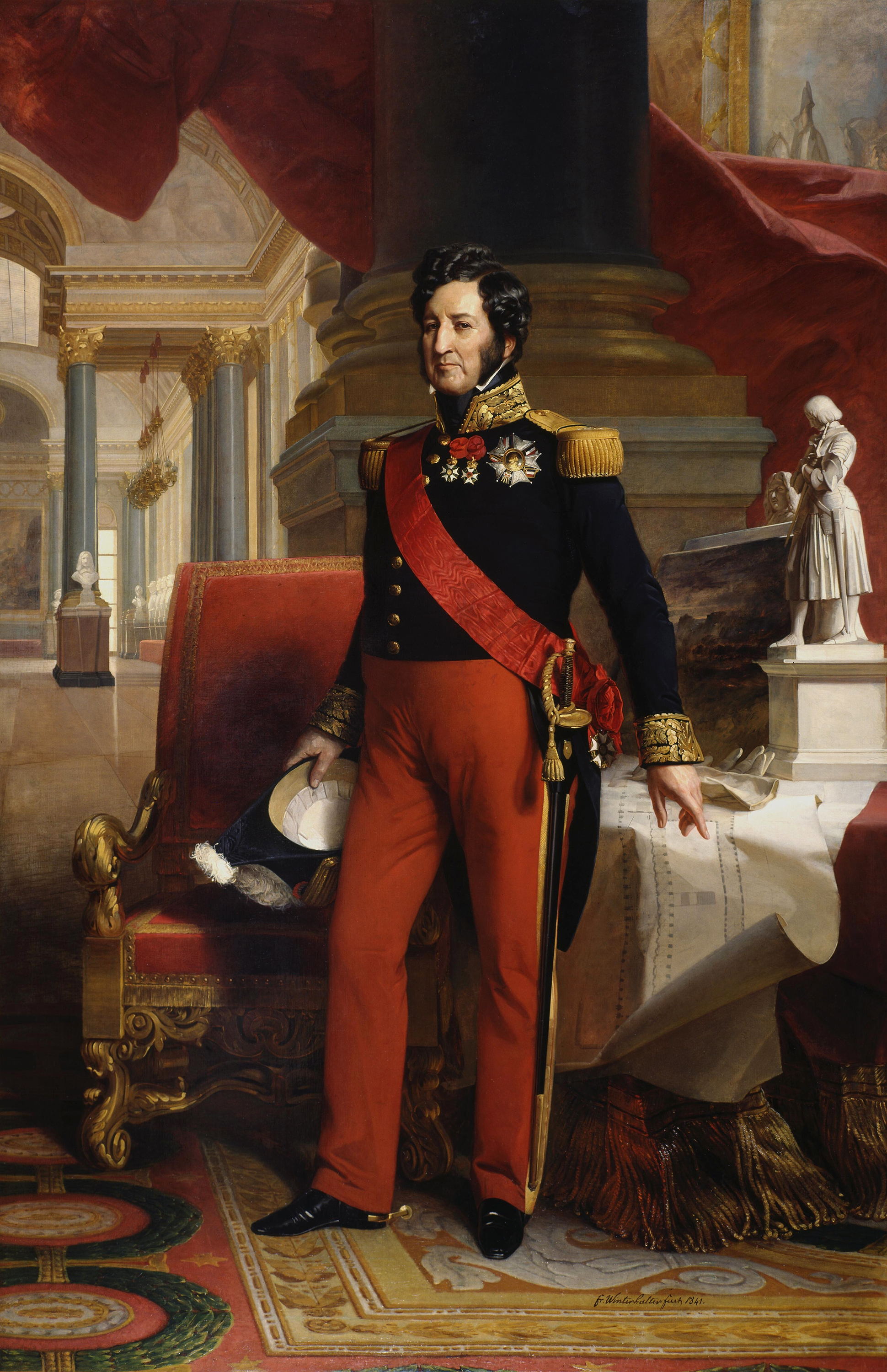
Portrait of Louis Philippe I by Franz Xaver Winterhalter, 1841

On 7 August 1830, two days before his accession to the throne, Louis-Philippe d'Orléans passed, in the presence of his notary, Jean-Antoine-Philippe Dentend, an act of "donation-partage" of his "biens patrimoniaux" was drawn up to avoid their being reunited with the crown lands upon his accession, in accordance with ancient law. Thus only the apanage d'Orléans was apportioned to crown lands in 1830.

In 1826, when he coveted the throne of Greece, Louis-Philippe envisioned making a "donation-partage", a project taken up and completed in 1830. By this act, the duke of Orléans transferred to his children the "nue-propriété" of his personal property, all the while reserving his use of it.

=== Acquisitions under the July monarchy ===
- The château de Neuilly at Neuilly-sur-Seine, was acquired on 16 July 1819 for the future Louis Philippe I, in exchange for the Écuries-de-Chartres on rue Saint-Thomas-du-Louvre.
- The château de la Maison-Rouge at Gagny (see above) bought by Louis-Philippe I on 29 December 1845 for 60,000 francs. After the Revolution of 1848, the former French king left it at the disposal of his former aide-de-camp, général de Rumigny, who acquired it on 12 January 1853 following the 10 January 1852 decree of the confiscation of the House of Orléans’ goods.
- The château de La Ferté-Vidame During the Restoration, it was given to the Duchess of Orléans. Upon her death in 1821, the domaine was inherited by her eldest son Louis Philippe I, future king of the French. He restored it by rebuilding its fortified wall, repairing its water features, and expanding the small château. His project was interrupted by the Revolution of 1848.

=== Pictures ===
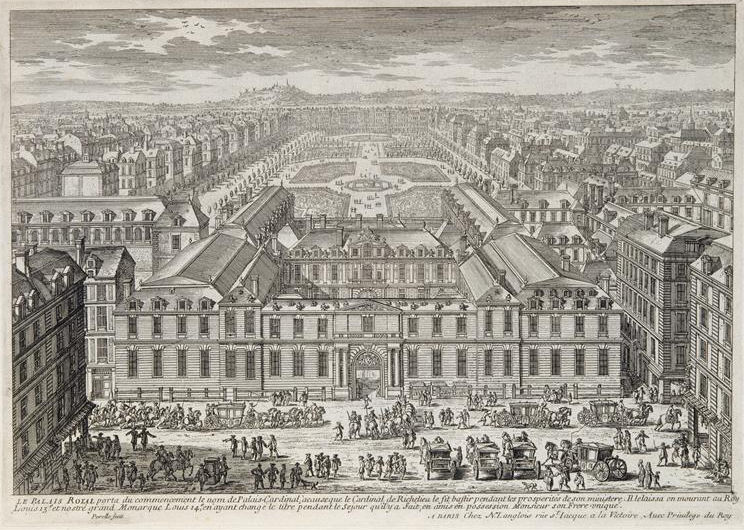
Palais Royal, Paris

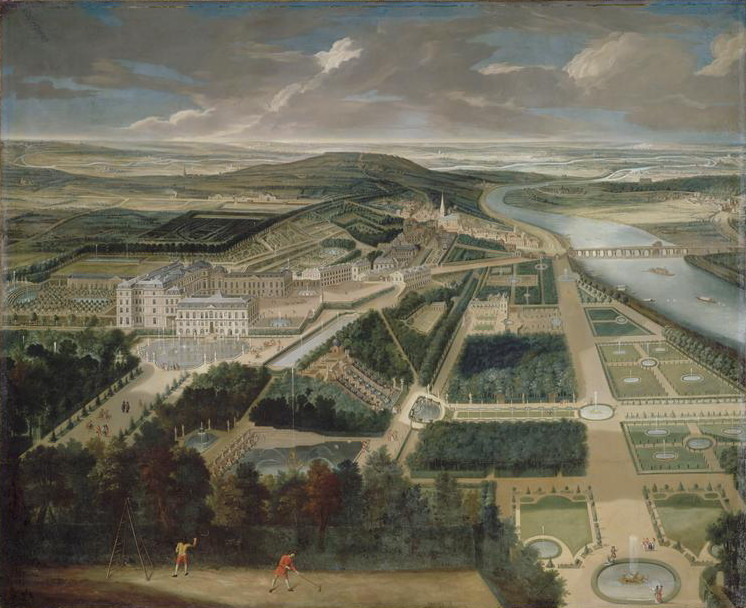
Château de Saint-Cloud

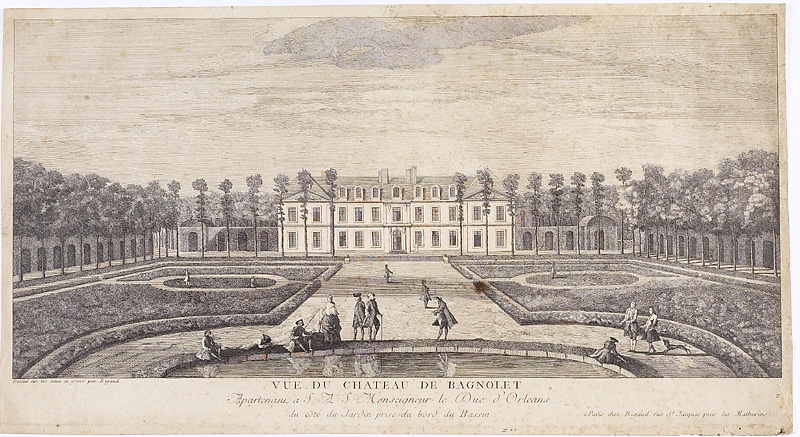
Château de Bagnolet, Paris

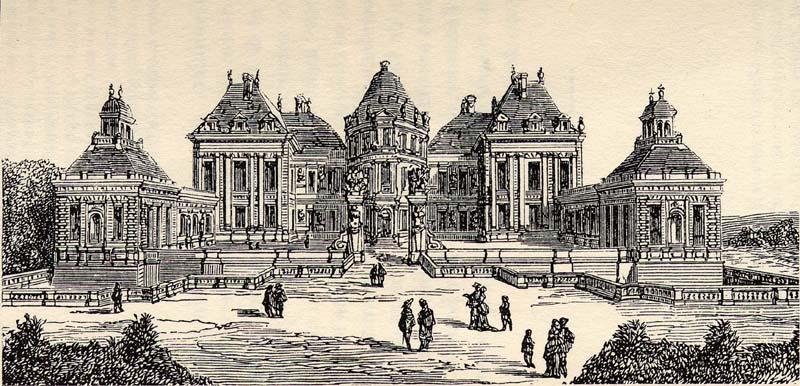
Château du Raincy

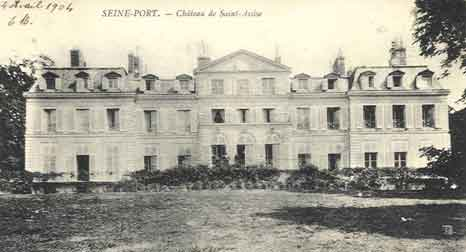
Château de Sainte-Assise

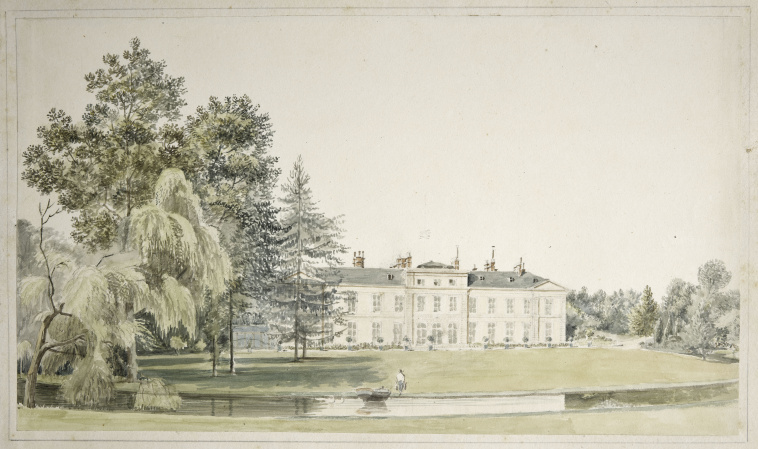
Château de Saint-Leu

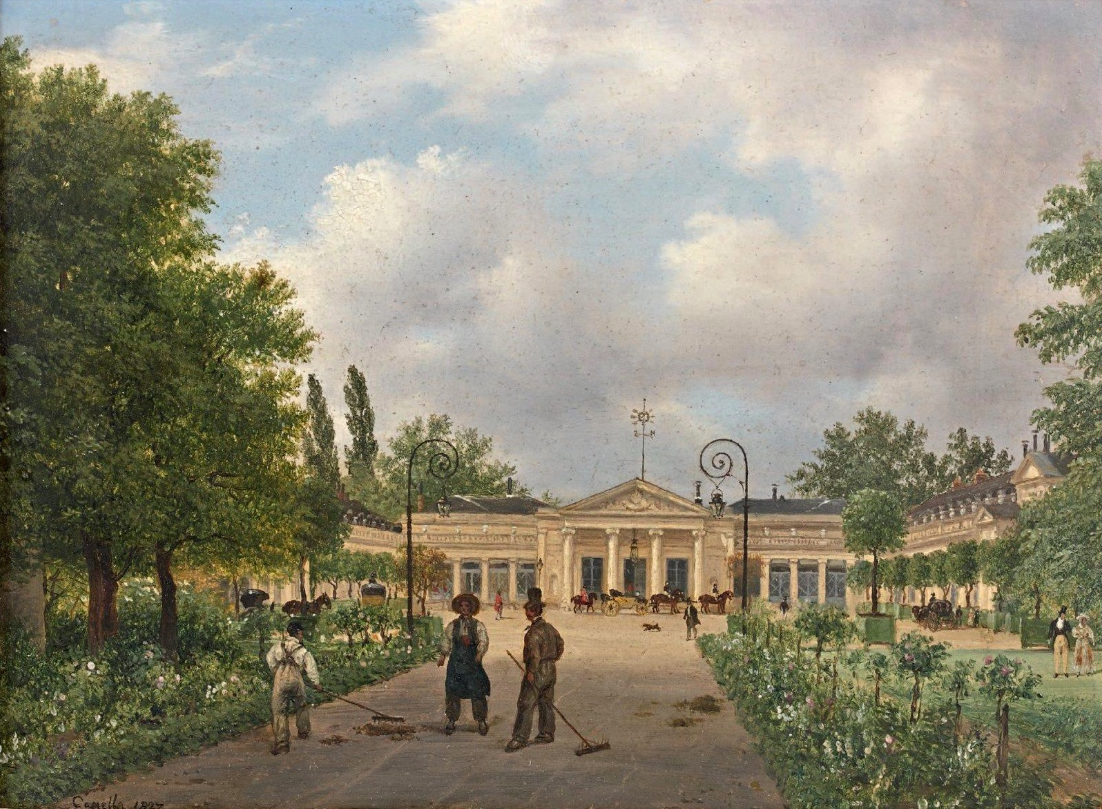
Château de Neuilly

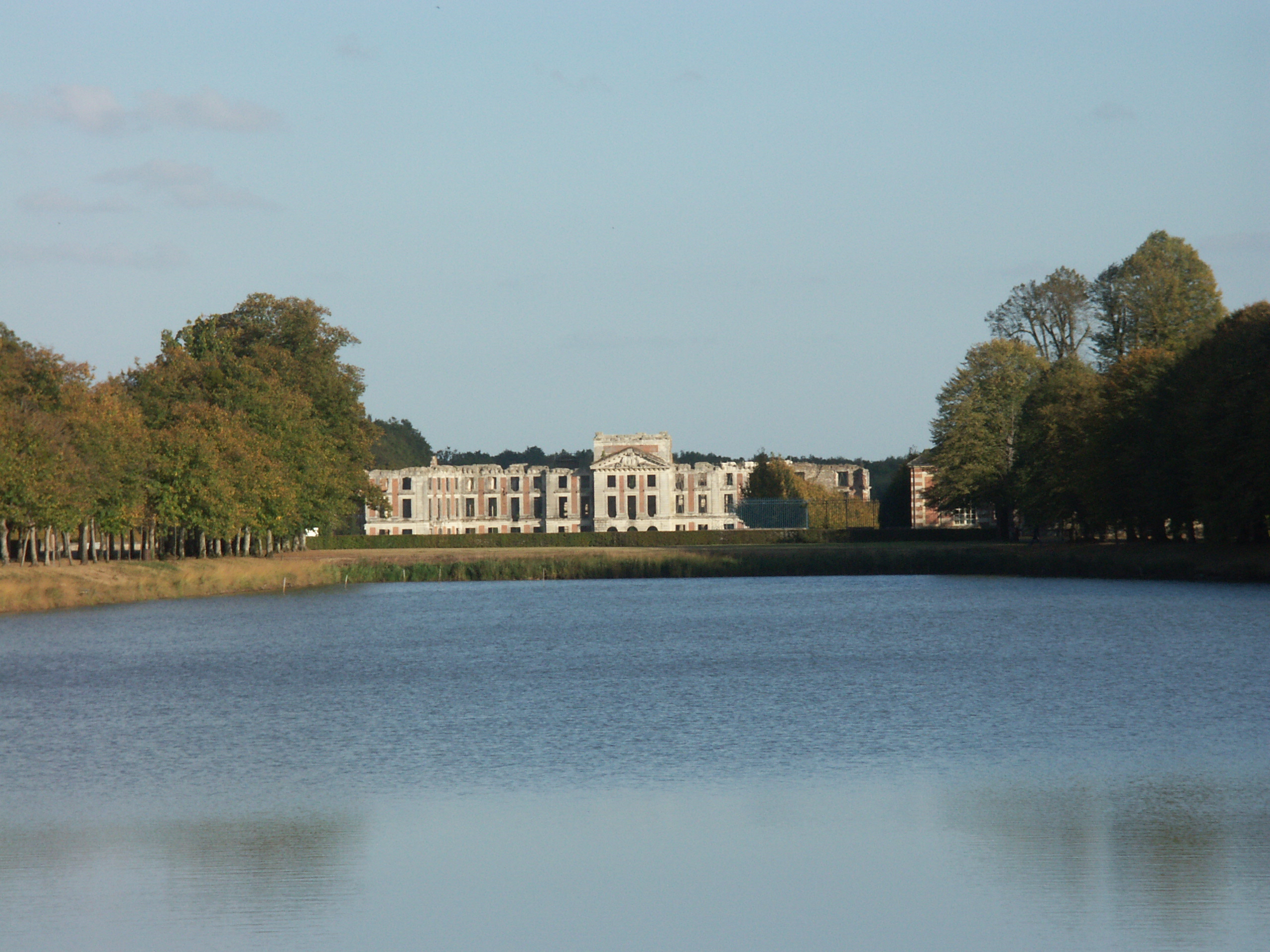
Château de La Ferté-Vidame

== French Republic ==
After King Louis Philippe I died while in exile in Claremont House, Surrey, in 1850, his property in the French Second Republic was meted out to his numerous children and grandchildren. All male members of the House of Orléans were exiled from France by law between 1886 and 1950. When Henri, Count of Paris (1908–1999), returned in 1950, he found little property left, except for a few castles which didn't produce income. Divorced with eleven children in 1974, he transferred key family assets to the family foundation, the fondation Saint-Louis, in order to exempt them from future distribution through inheritance and taxes. The respective head of the House of Orléans is the honorary chairman of the foundation whose assets included the Château d'Amboise (family museum), the Château de Bourbon-l'Archambault and the Château de Dreux (private residence), with the Chapelle royale de Dreux, the necropolis of the Orléans royal family. When he sold further property he faced legal action from his sons. At the time of his death in 1999 he remained heavily in debt.

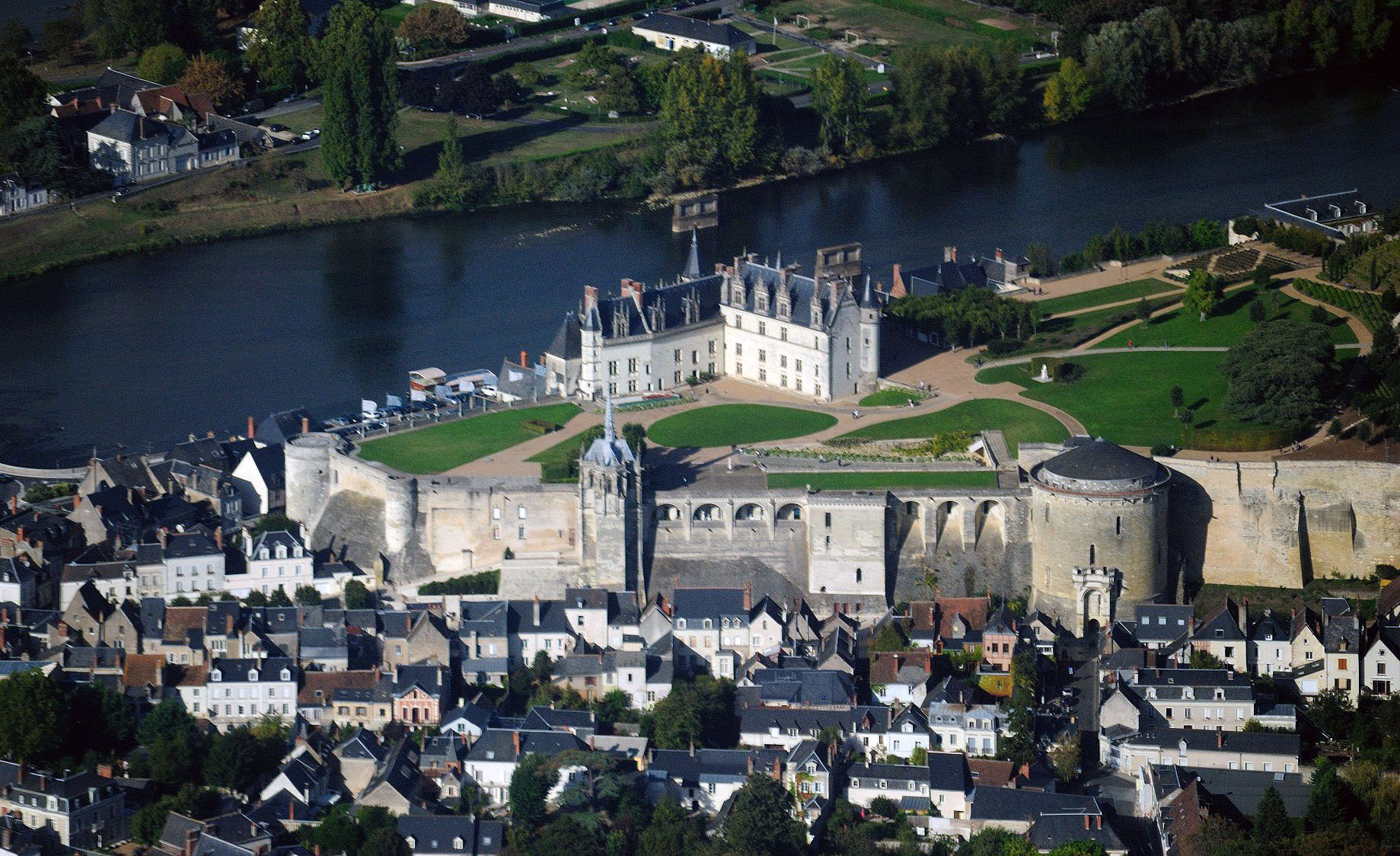
Château d'Amboise

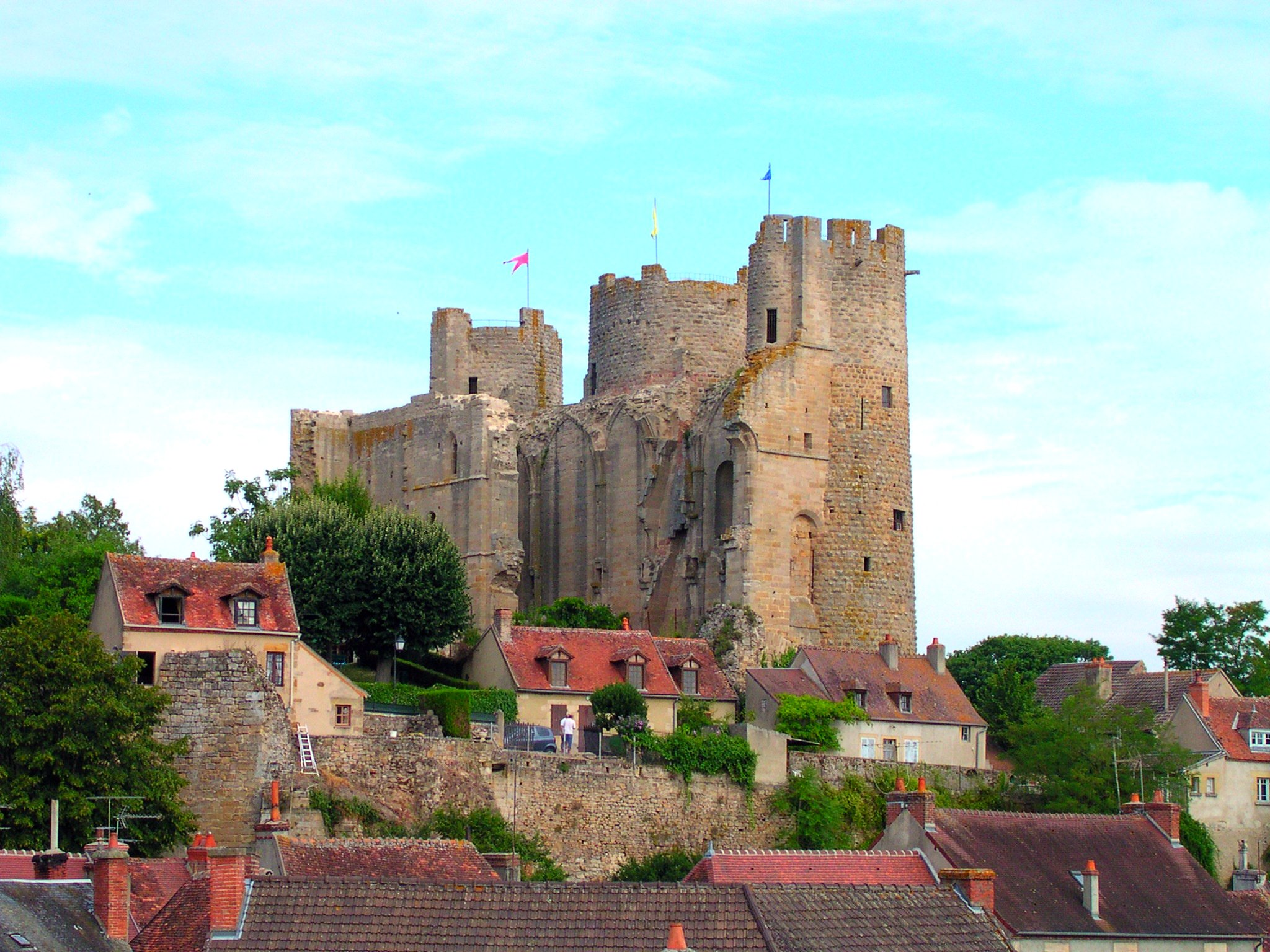
Château de Bourbon-l'Archambault

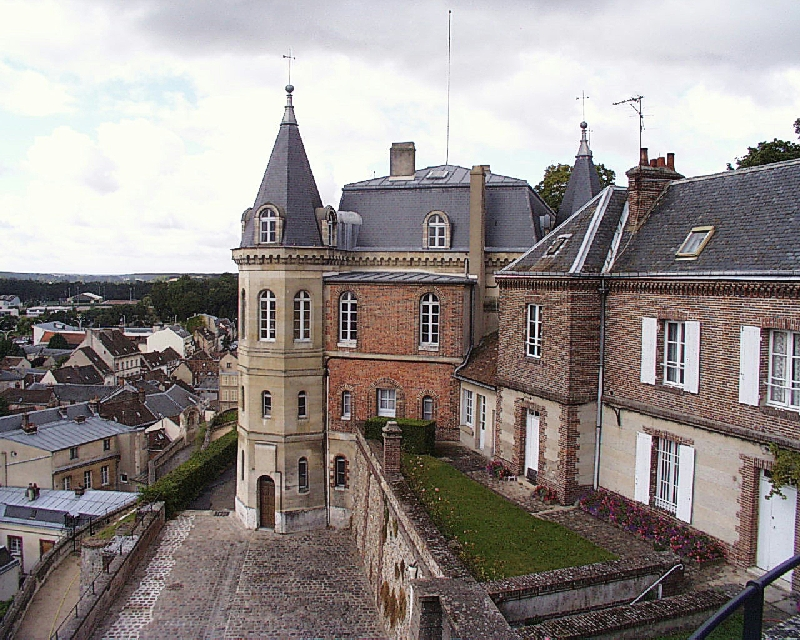
Château de Dreux

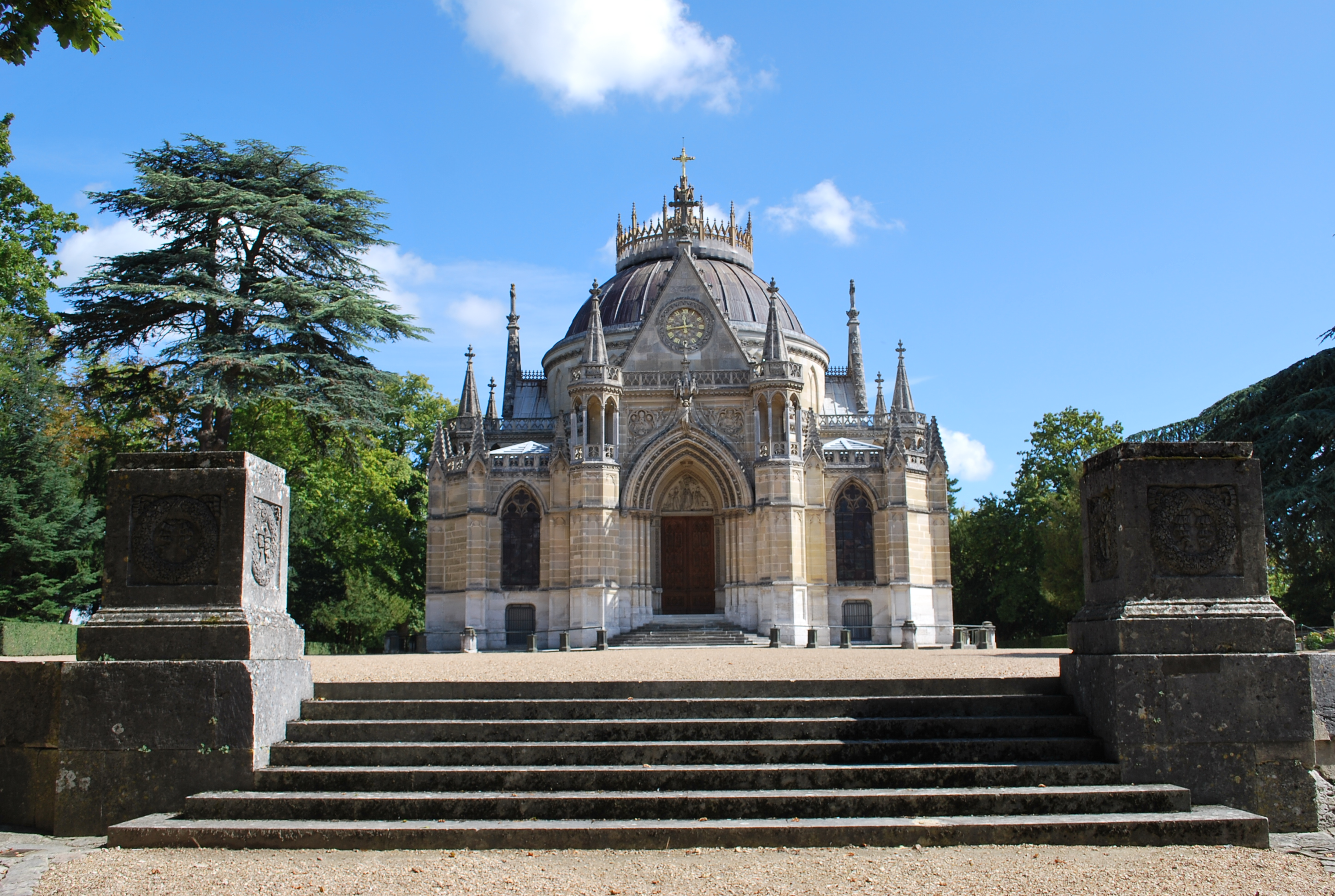
Chapelle royale de Dreux
