= Florent Fidèle Constant Bourgeois =

French painter

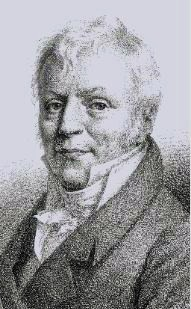
Constant Bourgeois, circa 1820

Florent Fidèle Constant Bourgeois (5 June 1767 – 26 June 1841) was a French landscape painter, engraver, and lithographer. He was born in Guiscard. He studied under David, but spent much of his time in Italy. Landon mentions him as an artist distinguished for the richness of his compositions and the purity of his style, and describes three of his pictures as being in the manner of Gaspard Poussin. He produced all of the designs for Alexandre de Laborde's study of French gardens, Descriptions des nouveaux jardins de la France et des ancient chateaux (Paris, 1808). He died at Passy (now in Paris), in June 1841.

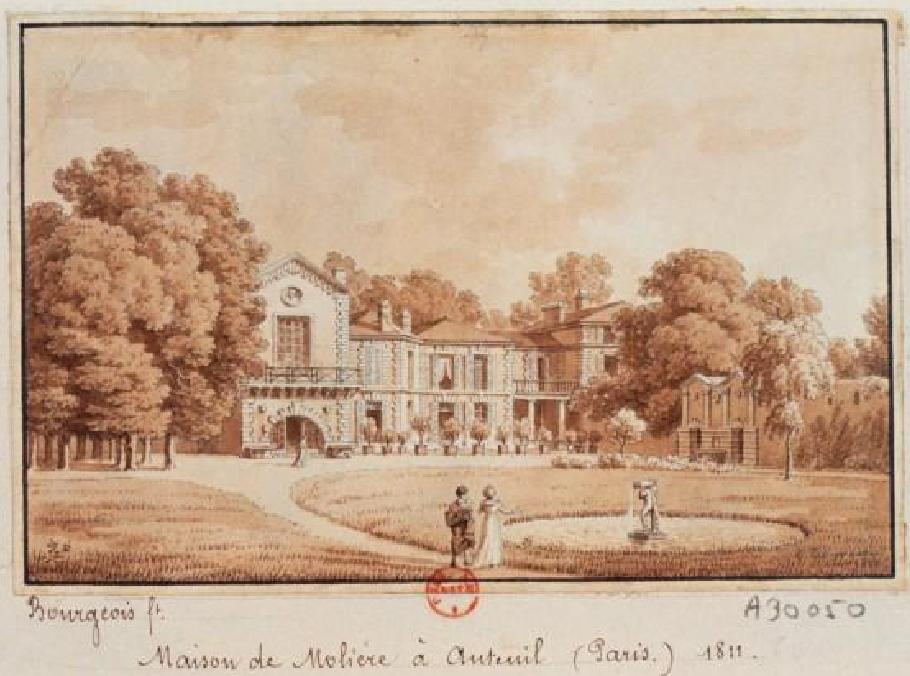
Molière's house at Auteuil near Paris, drawing from 1811
