= Castle of Saint-Leu =

Castle in Saint-Leu-la-Forêt, France

- Château de Saint-Leu
- Saint-Leu-la-Forêt, Val-d'Oise, Île-de-France in France
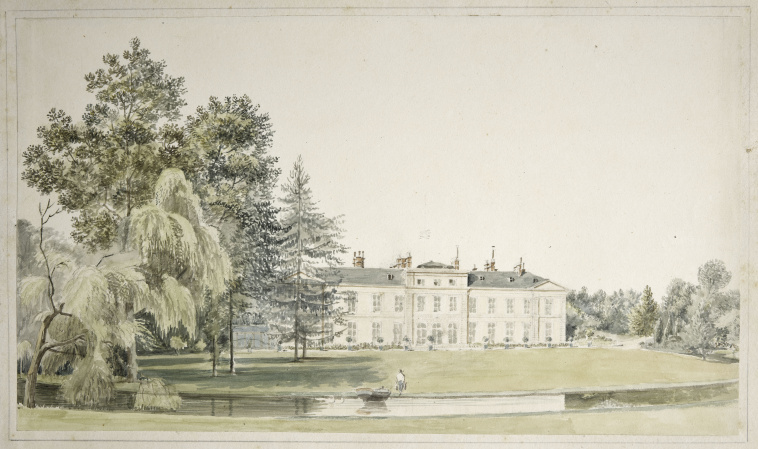
- Watercolor by Victor-Louis Nicolle (c. 1807)

Site information
- Type: Residencial castle
- Condition: Demolished/Repurposed

Location
- Location in Île-de-France
- Coordinates: 49°01′11″N 2°14′57″E

Site history
- Built: 1693
- Fate: Converted from a château to other uses

The Castle of Saint-Leu (Château de Saint-Leu) was located in Saint-Leu-la-Forêt (Val-d'Oise).

Before the French Revolution, the village of Saint-Leu-la-Forêt had two castles: Château d'en haut, demolished and rebuilt in the mid-17th century (in 1645 by Charles Le Clerc de Lesseville, Advisor to the Grand Council, on the site of the Montmorency Castle); Château d'en bas, built in 1693 for Lorieul de La Noue, King's secretary.

== History of the site ==
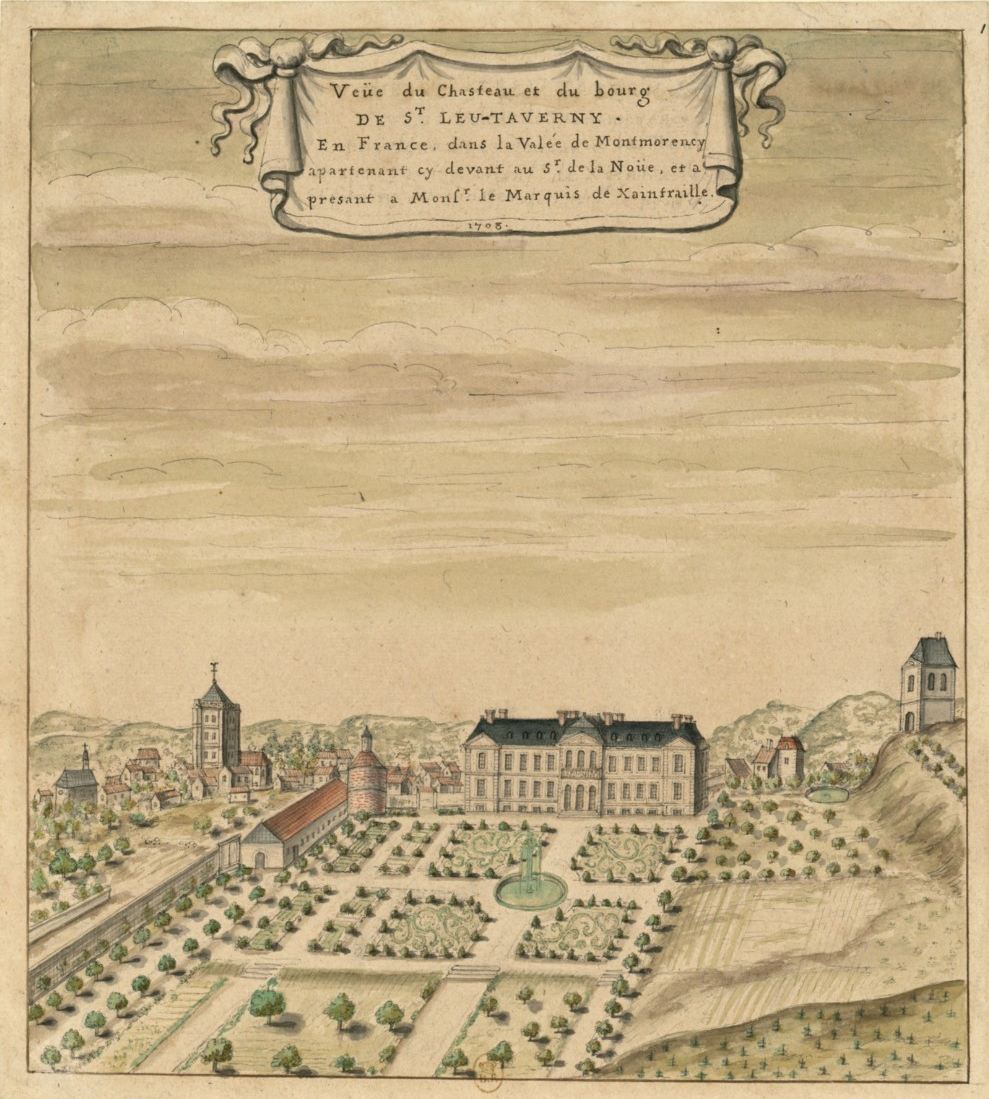
View of the castle and village of Saint-Leu-Taverny, in the valley of Montmorency belonging here in front of Mr. de La Noüe, and presented to the Marquis of Xaintraille - by Louis Boudan (1708).

Jean-Nicolas Dufort de Cheverny inherits the seigneury of Saint-Leu-la-Forêt from his father, Joseph Pierre Durfort de Saint-Leu, King's Counselor and Master Ordinary at the Court of Auditors. On August 31, 1765, he sold it to Claude-Henri Droin, King's Councillor and President of the Joinville Fair Trade Court.

In 1774, financier Jean-Joseph de Laborde acquired the Château d'en bas from President Droin. He wished to have a residence closer to Paris than his castle at La Ferté-Vidame (he would later acquire the Château de Méréville). He had the castle transformed into an English-style park, with a river running through it out of a large boulder. A small rectangular temple and a wooden bridge over the river, which could be crossed by canoe, embellished the garden.

In 1777, Laborde sold the estate to financier Nicolas Beaujon. In 1780, Beaujon sold it to the Duc de Chartres, the future Philippe Égalité, whom the Comtesse de Genlis, “governor” of her children's education, had persuaded to acquire an estate near Paris where she could stay with the young princes during the summer months to oversee their education.

On May 25, 1792, Chevalier Martial de Giac purchased the Château d'en-bas from the Duchesse d'Orléans. He died on the scaffold on July 5, 1794. His widow sold the estate to the Homberg family on September 27, 1799.

In 1804, Louis Bonaparte and his wife, Hortense de Beauharnais, acquired both the upper and lower châteaux. They demolished the former and united the two estates to form a park of around 80 hectares. The park was then redesigned by Louis-Martin Berthault, who also worked on the Château de Malmaison. Fabrics were added to the upper part (a Swiss valley with thatched cottages, the Devil's Bridge on a steep path, and an Egyptian monument), while three ponds were created in the lower part. The garden is known for engravings such as this one by Constant Bourgeois.

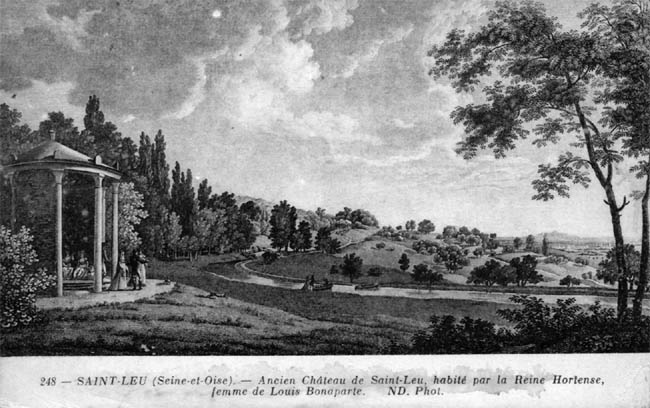
Engraving by Constant Bourgeois.

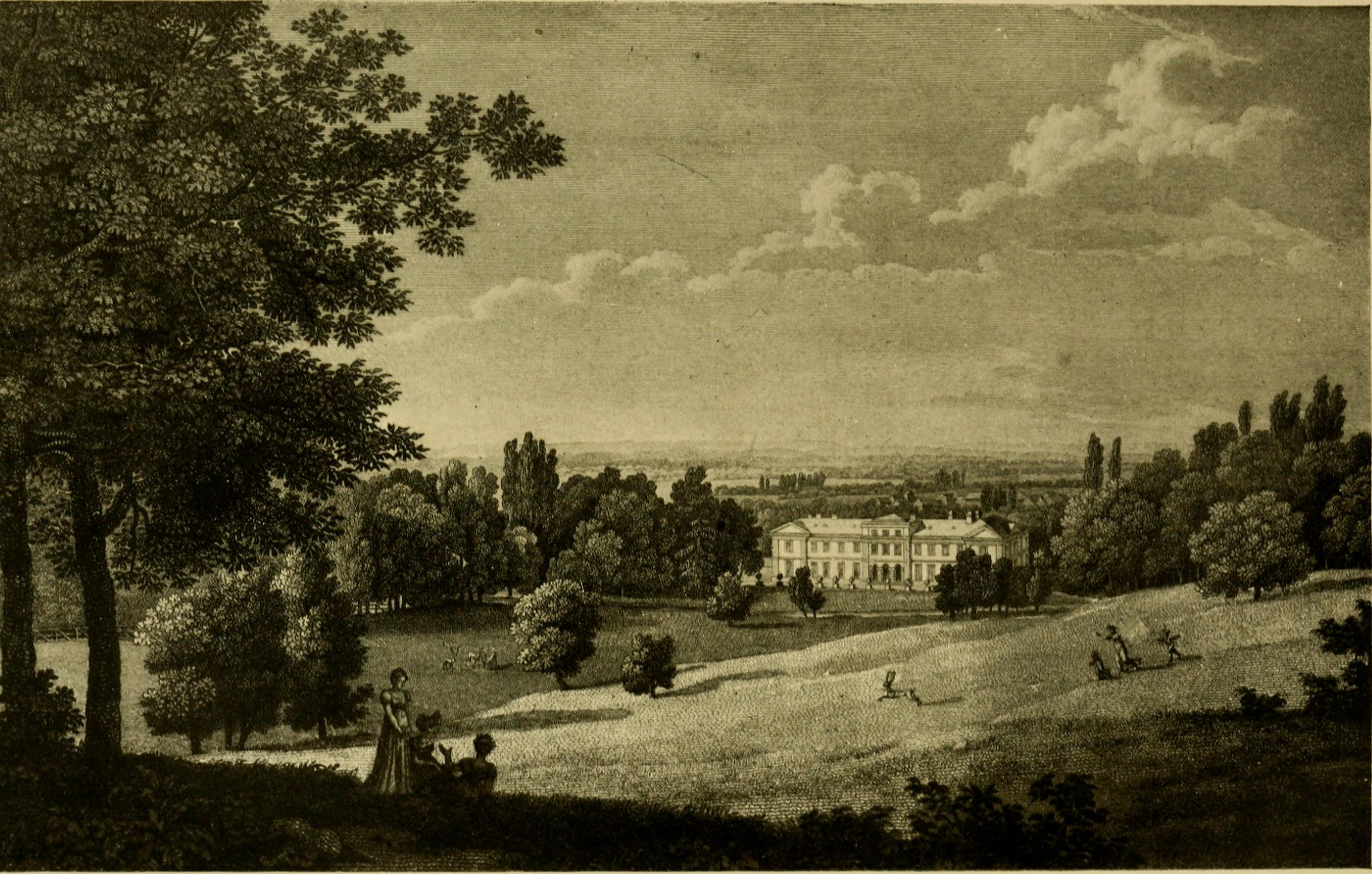
The castle of Saint-Leu.

After separating from her husband (who took the title of “Count of Saint-Leu”) in 1810, Queen Hortense retained Saint-Leu, where she held a number of glittering celebrations.

In 1814, Louis XVIII made her Duchess of Saint-Leu, but in 1815, accused of helping to prepare Napoleon I's return, she went into exile and had to abandon Saint-Leu.

In 1816, the estate was acquired by Louis VI Henri de Bourbon-Condé, Duc de Bourbon, Prince de Condé in 1818, who wished to have a residence on the edge of the Montmorency forest, which belonged to him. He settled there with his mistress, the scheming Baroness de Feuchères.

On August 27, 1830, the duke was found hanged (although his feet were touching the ground) from the espagnolette of his bedroom window on the second floor of the castle. Although his mistress, to whom he left a large fortune, was suspected of murder, she was not prosecuted, as the courts were unable to determine whether the death was the result of murder or suicide. The exact nature of the death remains a mystery to this day.

The Baroness de Feuchères, heiress to the castle and faced with local hostility after this resounding event, was quick to sell it, but as the upkeep of the estate was proving very costly, the castle was demolished in 1837 and the park was subdivided.

In June 1844, a monument was erected in memory of the Prince de Condé. The cross on top of the monument is said to mark the exact spot where the espagnolette from which he was found hanged was located. This monument still exists today. Of the castle's grounds, however, only faint vestiges remain.

== See also ==
- Saint-Leu-la-Forêt
- Goods of the House of Orléans

== Bibliography ==
- Belleville, Adolphe de (1831). Les Secrets de Saint-Leu. Notice curieuse sur ce château et ses propriétaires, Aiglantine de Vendôme, la reine Hortense, etc. Suivie d'une biographie complète sur la baronne de Feuchères, et de détails sur la mort du duc de Bourbon [The Secrets of Saint-Leu. Curious notice on this castle and its owners, Aiglantine de Vendôme, Queen Hortense, etc. Followed by a complete biography on the Baroness de Feuchères, and details on the death of the Duke of Bourbon] (in French). Paris: Dentu. p. 64.
- Caignard, Henri (1970). Saint-Leu-la-Forêt, Val-d'Oise : Jean de Nivelle, Joseph Fouché, Philippe Égalité, le prince de Condé, Louis Bonaparte, la reine Hortense [Saint-Leu-la-Forêt, Val-d'Oise: Jean de Nivelle, Joseph Fouché, Philippe Egalité, the Prince of Condé, Louis Bonaparte, Queen Hortense] (in French). Roudil.
- Défossez, Marie-Paule (1997). Saint-Leu-la-Forêt (in French). Saint-Leu-la-Forêt: FeniXX. p. 158. ISBN 9782402356749.
- Maillard, André (1936). Saint-Leu-la-Forêt à travers les siècles : histoire des châteaux, des seigneurs, des princes, de la reine Hortense, duchesse de Saint-Leu, et du village depuis les origines jusqu'à nos jours [Saint-Leu-la-Forêt through the centuries: history of the castles, the lords, the princes, Queen Hortense, Duchess of Saint-Leu, and the village from its origins to the present day] (in French). Jouve. p. 240.
