= Stéphanie Félicité, comtesse de Genlis =

French writer (1746–1830)

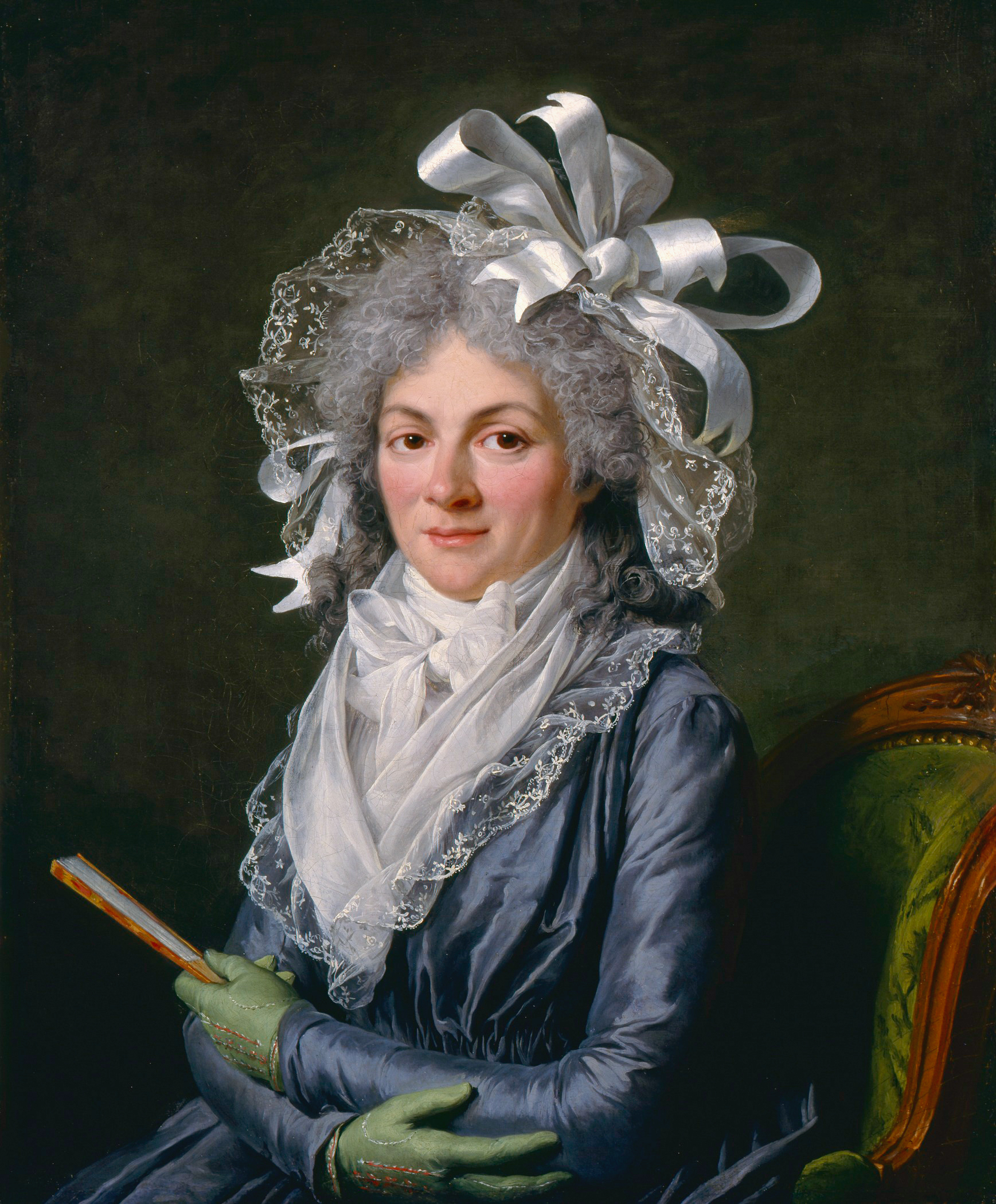
- Portrait by Adélaïde Labille-Guiard (1790)
- Born: Caroline-Stéphanie-Félicité du Crest de Saint-Aubin; 25 January 1746; Issy-l'Évêque, Saône-et-Loire, France
- Died: 31 December 1830 (aged 84); Paris, France
- Resting place: Père Lachaise Cemetery
- Citizenship: France
- Occupations: Author, educationalist
- Spouse(s): Charles-Alexis Brûlart, Comte de Genlis (1763; separated 1782)
- Children: 3
- Relatives: Madame de Montesson
- Writing career
- Language: French
- Genre: Novels
- Subjects: Historical romance, Sentimental novel
- Notable works: Mémoires inédits sur le XVIII' siècle; Adèle et Théodore

Caroline-Stéphanie-Félicité, Madame de Genlis (25 January 1746 – 31 December 1830) was a French writer of the late 18th and early 19th century, known for her novels and theories of children's education. She is now best remembered for her journals and the historical perspective they provide on her life and times.

== Life ==
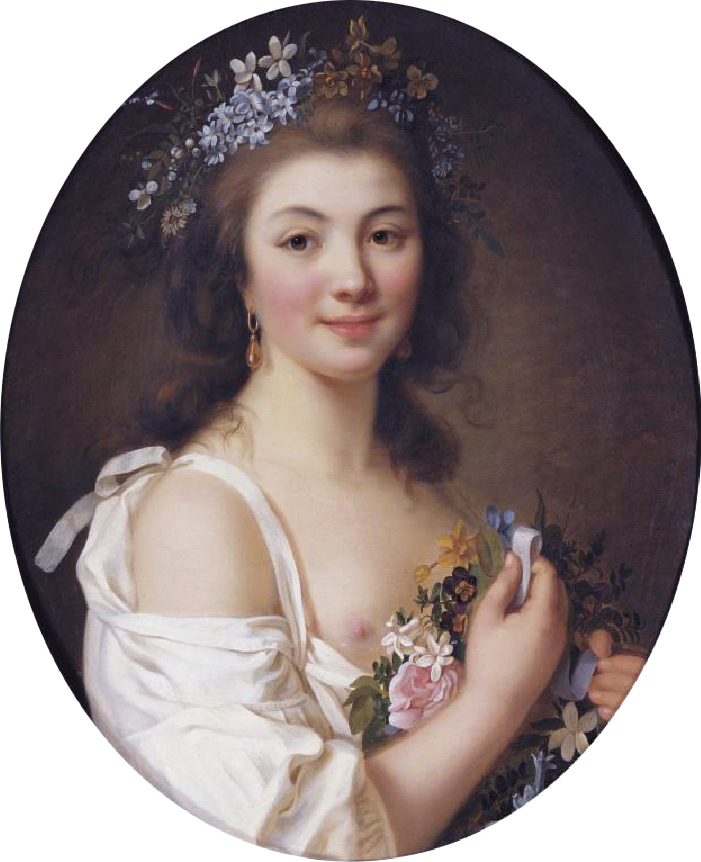
Madame de Genlis, portrait by Jacques-Antoine-Marie Lemoine

Caroline-Stéphanie-Félicité du Crest de Saint-Aubin was born on 25 April 1746 at Champcéry near Autun, in the Saône-et-Loire region. Her parents were Pierre César du Crest (1711–1763), later Marquis de Saint Aubin, and Marie Françoise Félicité Mauget de Mézières (1717–1790).

Her father's debts forced him to sell their home in 1757 and move to Paris. She and her mother spent interludes at the estates of Charles Guillaume Le Normant d'Étiolles and Alexandre Le Riche de La Poupelinière, where she was taught dancing by a ballet master of the Comédie-Française and singing by Ferdinando Pellegrini. She also learned to play the harp, a skill which later in Paris she used to support them. Pierre César was captured by the English while returning from Santo Domingo in 1760 and one of his fellow prisoners was Charles-Alexis Brûlart, Comte de Genlis (1737–1793), whom he introduced to his daughter after their release. After Pierre died in 1763, his sister married de Genlis at midnight on 8 November 1763; as a younger son, his title 'Comte' was complimentary and she was always known as Madame de Genlis.

In 1782 she published her first epistolary novel Adèle et Thèodore written while on holiday in Lusignano in Liguria. Its basic theme is education, where she takes a position unlike Rousseau in Emile. For her the condition of women depends on the education that is imparted to take the role that belongs to her in society, while for Jean-Jacques Rousseau the sphere of female action is restricted to the domestic sphere and therefore their education remains limited; for Genlis, education represents a step forward for her emancipation but on the other hand she submits first to the will of her mother and then of her husband. The success of this novel was due to the fact that she is the first woman to be gouverneur of princes of royal blood.

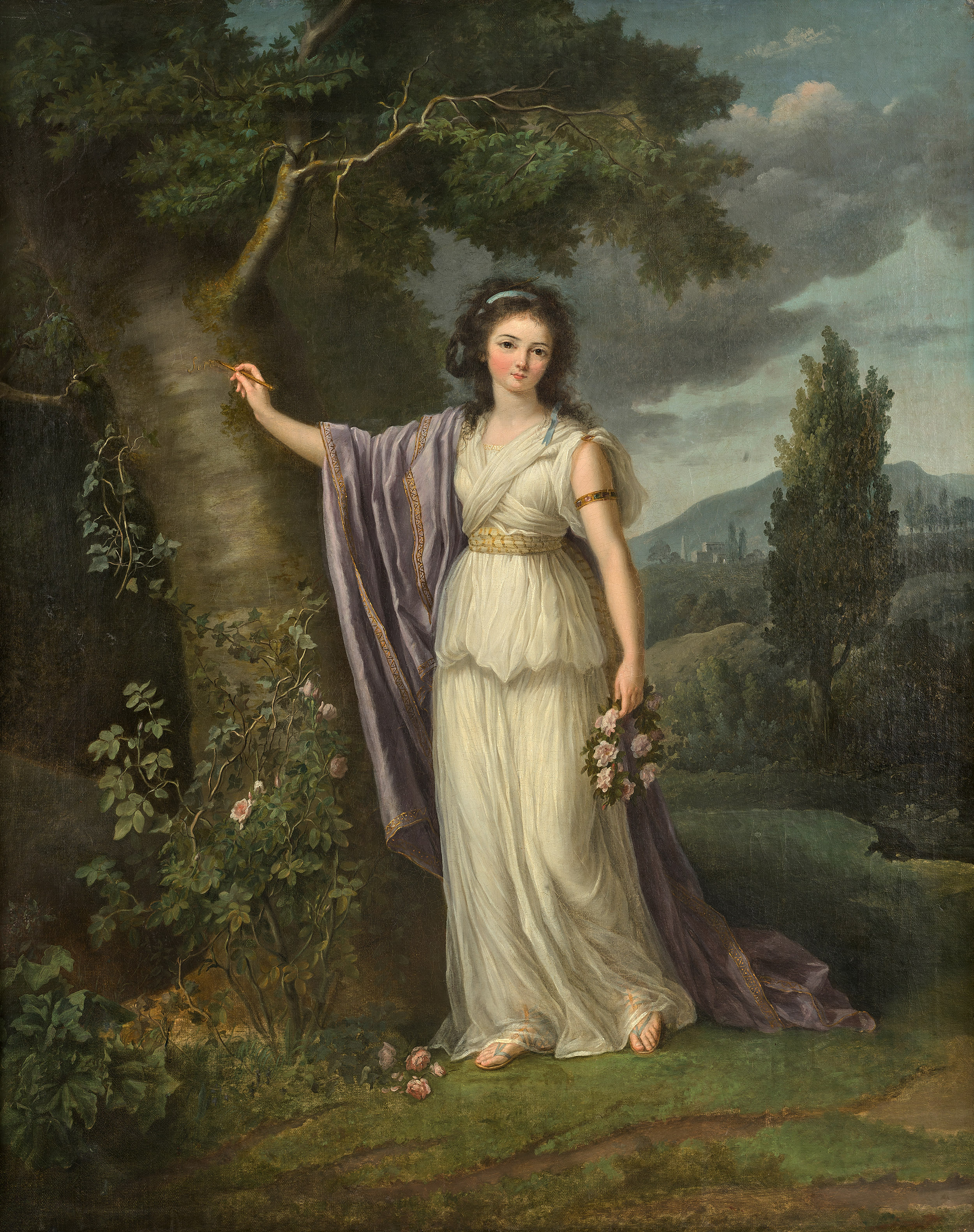
Pulchérie Brûlart, portrait by Marie-Victoire Lemoine (1789)

Since Charles-Alexis' own parents were dead, they went to live with his godfather, the Marquis de Puisieux and had three children; Caroline (1765–1786), Pulchérie (1767–1847) and Casimir (1768–1773). It is possible that she also had one or more secret offspring; as Talleyrand later wrote: "In spite of the strictness which she preached and the morality which she professed in her writing, one always meets in her later novels something of the easiness of her earlier morals; one always finds in them love affairs and illegitimate children."

She died in Paris on 31 December 1830 and was buried in Père Lachaise Cemetery.

== Career ==
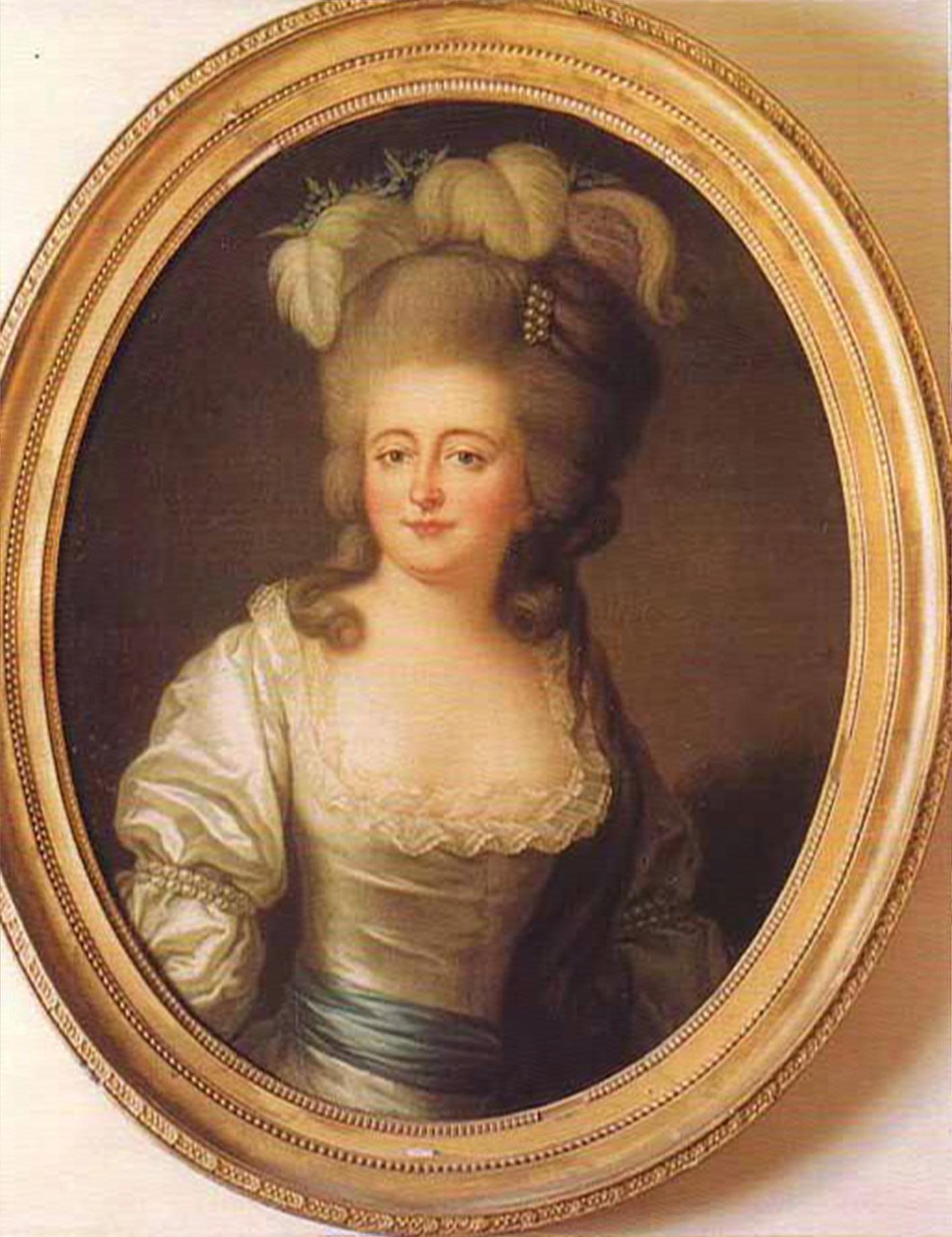
Her aunt, Madame de Montesson, wife of the duc d'Orléans

Her relative, Madame de Montesson (1738–1806), was also known for her beauty and intelligence, later becoming a playwright. She married the duc d'Orléans in 1773, although barred from using the title 'Duchess of Orléans.' With her support, Stéphanie-Félicité became lady-in-waiting to Louise Marie Adélaïde de Bourbon, wife of the Duke's son Philippe d'Orléans, Duke of Chartres, and with her husband joined the Duke's entourage in the Palais-Royal in early 1772, drawing a stipend of 10,000 livres.

She began an affair with Chartres almost immediately, their love letters being published in 1904 by Gaston Maugras as L’idylle d’un gouverneur. As Talleyrand noted, "The Duc de Chartres found her charming, told her this, and was quickly listened to, for Madame de Genlis, to avoid the scandal of coquetry, always yielded easily." Although their affair was short-lived, in 1777 he appointed her governess to his daughters, who were joined by two 'adopted' English girls, Stephanie Caroline Anne Syms or "Pamela" and Hermine Syms. This was in line with her theory of educating her pupils with children of different nationalities to better learn foreign languages; the household already contained English and Italian servants. Although it has often been suggested Pamela was the product of her relationship with Chartres, this has been challenged by recent scholarship. In 1781, Chartres took the then unusual step of putting her in charge of his sons' education, which led to the resignation of their existing tutors; she and Charles-Alexis formally separated the following year.

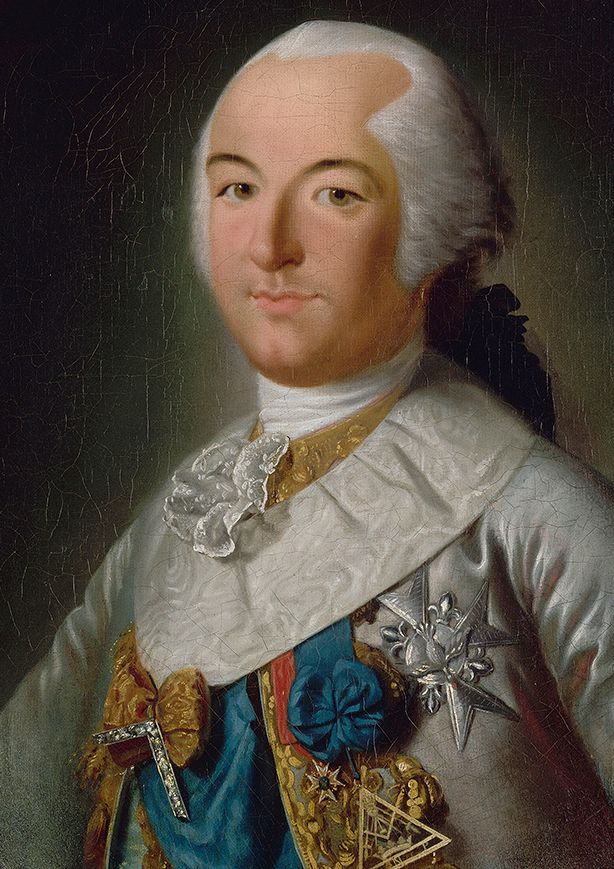
Philippe, Duke of Chartres, later Phillipe Égalité; executed 1793

For her husband's amusement, Madame de Montesson set up their own theatre, for which she and Madame de Genlis wrote plays, the parts being taken by their children. Audiences numbered as many as 500 aristocrats and writers, including Diderot and D'Alembert. This developed her approach to education, later set out in Théâtre d'éducation (4 vols., 1779–1780), a collection of short comedies for young people, Les Annales de la vertu (2 vols., 1781) and Adèle et Théodore (3 vols., 1782). Charles Augustin Sainte-Beuve claims she anticipated many modern methods of teaching; history was taught using magic lantern slides and her pupils learnt botany from a botanist during their walks.

In 1785, Chartres succeeded as duc d'Orléans; her brother Charles-Louis Ducrest became his secretary. When the French Revolution began in 1789, both he and Charles-Alexis joined the Girondins faction and were executed in 1793 with many of their political colleagues. Stéphanie-Félicité and her pupil Mademoiselle d'Orléans took refuge in Switzerland, before moving to Berlin in 1794. Considered too liberal by Frederick William II, she was forced to live in Hamburg but returned when his son succeeded him in 1797.

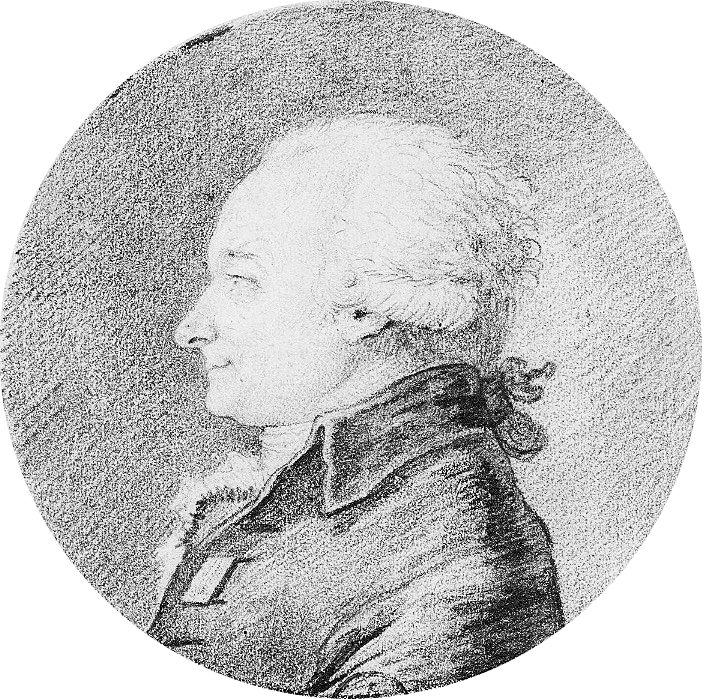
Her husband Charles-Alexis Brûlart, Comte de Genlis (1737-1793); executed with her former lover Philippe in 1793

After Napoleon came to power in 1799, she returned to France. Her aunt was a close friend of Napoleon's wife Joséphine de Beauharnais and this connection resulted in her being given rooms at the Arsenal and a small pension. Her best known romance Mademoiselle de Clermont was published in 1802, along with a number of other novels. Her government pension was discontinued after the 1814 Bourbon Restoration; her former pupil Louis Philippe gave her a small pension but she relied on the income from her writing.

Her later years were occupied with literary quarrels, notably those arising from her 1822 publication Diners du Baron d'Holbach, which attacked what she viewed as 'the intolerance, fanaticism, and eccentricities of the philosophes of the 18th century.' She survived long enough to see her former pupil, Louis Philippe, become king in 1830. The vast majority of her works are now little read but provide interesting historical background, especially Mémoires inédits sur le XVIII' siècle, published in 1825.

== Legacy ==
In Britain, she was best known for her children's works, which many welcomed as they presented many of Rousseau's methods, while attacking his principles. They also avoided libertinism and Roman Catholicism, concepts often associated with the French by the British, who appreciated her innovative educational methods, particularly her morality plays. According to Magdi Wahba, another reason for her popularity was the belief she was as moral as the Baronne d'Almane in Adèle et Théodore. They discovered this was not the case when she fled to London in 1791 but while she lost the esteem of some, including Frances Burney, it had little effect on her book sales.

Jane Austen was familiar with her works, although she returned the novel 'Alphonsine' to the Lending Library, claiming it "did not do. We were disgusted in twenty pages, as, independent of a bad translation, it has indelicacies which disgrace a pen hitherto so pure". However, in Emma her heroine suggests her governess would raise her own daughter the better for having practised upon her, "like La Baronne d'Almane on La Countesse d'Ostalis in Madame de Genlis' Adelaide and Theodore". Modern critics claim other themes addressed by Genlis appear in both Emma and Northanger Abbey. Austen continued to read (and lend out) her works however, complaining in 1816 for example that she couldn't "read Olimpe et Theophile without being in a rage. It is really too bad! – Not allowing them to be happy together when they are married." Austen's nieces Anna and Caroline also drew inspiration for their own writings from Madame de Genlis.

British women writers of the late eighteenth century were particularly inspired by Genlis's novel of education Adèle et Théodore, which Anna Letitia Barbauld compared to Rousseau's Emile as a type of "preceptive fiction." Anna Barbauld admired Genlis's "system of education, the whole of which is given in action" with "infinite ingenuity in the various illustrative incidents." Clara Reeve described Genlis's educational program as "the most perfect of any" in Plans of Education (1794), an epistolary work loosely based on Genlis's novel. Adelaide O'Keeffe's Dudley (1819) was modeled directly after Genlis's work, and other texts such as Anna Letitia Barbauld and John Aikin's Evenings at Home were inspired by Genlis's Tales of the Castle, a "spin-off" of Adèle et Théodore. As Donelle Ruwe notes, Genlis's emphasis on the mother as a powerful educating heroine was inspirational, but so too were her books' demonstrations of how to create homemade literacy objects such as flash cards and other teaching aids.

== In literature ==
Félicité de Genlis appears as a character in the works of Honoré de Balzac (Illusions perdues) and Victor Hugo (Les Misérables), among others. She is also mentioned in War and Peace by Leo Tolstoy, Our Village by Mary Russell Mitford, Oblomov by Ivan Goncharov, humourist story M-me Genlis's spirit by Nikolai Leskov, The Angel in the House by Coventry Patmore, The Rector of Justin by Louis Auchincloss, Nausea by Jean-Paul Sartre, Emma by Jane Austen, and A Place of Greater Safety by Hilary Mantel.

== Selected works ==
Madame de Genlis was a prodigious author. As Saint-Beuve observed in one of his Causeries de Lundi, "if the inkstand had not existed, she would have invented it."

- Genlis, Stéphanie Félicité du Crest de Saint Aubin, Madame de GENLIS (1746-1830) Correspondance en grande partie inédite adressée par Madame de Genlis à M. Anatole de Montesquiou (1788-1878), officier d'ordonnance de l'Empereur et aide de camp. L'ensemble des lettres, au nombre de 520 environ, couvre la période 1810 à 1830, mais surtout les années 1825 et 1826. L'année 1826 représente une correspondance presque journalière comme novembre et décembre 1825. Cette correspondance est parfois très intime, Madame de Genlis appelle d'ailleurs M. de Montesquiou : "Mon cher Anatole", elle est aussi très en relation avec les idées et les choses du temps. Elle parle beaucoup de magnétisme, de religion, d'éducation bien sûr mais aussi de personnages tels que Voltaire, Talma ou Madame Récamier. Chaque lettre est généralement signée et comporte une à deux pages in-4 avec adresse. On trouve dans l'année 1820 un petit manuscrit de 30 pages intitulé "Cantique des fleurs" fait pour Pulchérie, sa fille(1830). La correspondance d’Anatole de Montesquiou à Madame de Genlis est, elle, conservée aux Archives Nationales.
- [Genlis], Théâtre à l'usage des jeunes personnes, ou Théâtre de l'éducation, I, Paris: Lambert et Baudoin, 1779; II, III, IV, Paris, 1780; 2v, Paris, 1781 Paris? 1782; Suisse: Libraires associés, 1781, 2v; Paris, 1826, Paris, 1829, 5v; London, 1781; 3v, London, 1783; London, 1787
- Genlis, Theatre of Education, tr., 3v, London: T. Cadell, 1783
- [Genlis], Théâtre de Société, Paris/Suisse: Libraires associés, 1780; 2v, 1781; 1782
- Genlis, Les Annales de la vertu, ou Cours d'histoire à l'usage des jeunes personnes, I, Paris: Lambert et Baudoin, 1781, 2v, Paris, 1782
- [Genlis], Adèle et Théodore, Paris: Lambert et Baudouin, 1782, 3v; 1804
- [Genlis], Adèle et Théodore, ou, Lettres sur l'éducation; Contenant tous les principes relatifs aux trois différents plans d'Education, des Princes, des jeunes Personnes, & des Hommes, Maestricht: Dufour et Roux, Imprimeurs-Libraires associés, 1782, 3v
- Genlis, Adèle and Théodore, London: Cadell, 1788
- Genlis, Adèle et Théodore, Paris: Crapelet, 1801, 2nd ed.
- Genlis, Essais sur l'education des hommes, et particulièrement des princes par les femmes, pour servir de supplément aux Lettres sur l'Education, Paris, 1782
- Genlis?, Deux réputations, attaque contre les philosophes, Paris?, 1784
- Genlis, Le club des dames, ou le retour de Descartes, comédie en un acte en prose, Paris, 1784
- Genlis, Les Veillées du château, ou Cours de morale à l'usage des enfants, 2v, Paris: Lambert, 1784
- Genlis, Tales of the Castle, London, 1785 (Princeton PQ 1985 G5xV413 1785)
- Genlis, Tales of the Castle, tr., Thomas Holcroft, 4th ed., 5v, London: Robinson, 1793 (NYPL *ZAN) "The Solitary Family of Normandy [Forges]; The Two Reputations; Daphnis and Panrose; The Palace of Truth"
- Genlis, Contes moraux, Paris: Libraires associés, 1785 (@ Gallica)
- Genlis, Sacred dramas, London, 1786 (from Old Testament)
- Genlis, Pièces tirées de l'Ecriture Sainte par Mme de G., Genève, 1787 (from Old Testament)
- Genlis, La religion considérée comme l'unique base du bonheur et de la véritable philosophie, Paris: Imprimerie polytype, 1787; Paris, 1787; Paris, 1790
- Genlis, The child of nature (play), London, 1788
- Genlis, Discours sur l'éducation de Monsieur le Dauphin, Paris: Onfroy, 1790
- Genlis, Discours sur l'éducation publique du peuple, Paris, 1791
- Genlis, Discours sur le luxe et l'hospitalité, Paris, 1791
- Genlis, Discours sur la suppression des couvens de religieuses et l'éducation publique des femmes, Paris, 1791
- Genlis, Leçons d'une gouvernante à ses élèves, ou Fragmens d'un journal qui a été fait pour l'éducation des enfans de Monsieur d'Orléans, Paris: Onfroy, 1791, 2v
- Genlis, Lessons of a Governess, London: Robinson, 1792 (Princeton LB 575 G4 A6)
- Genlis, Les chevaliers du cygne, ou la cour de Charlemagne, 3v, Hamburg: Fauche, 1795; Paris, 1818
- Genlis, The castle of truth, a moral tale, Philadelphia, 1795
- Genlis, Précis de la conduite de Madame de Genlis depuis la Révolution..., Hamburg: Hoffmann, 1796 *ZAN-T3340 Reel 36 No. 239
- Genlis, Epître à l'asile que j'aurai, suivie de deux fables, du chant d'une jeune sauvage, de l'épître à Henriette Sercey et des réflexions d'un ami des talens et des arts, par Mme de Genlis, Hambourg, 1796
- Genlis, The Knights of the Swan, tr., Beresford, 2v, Dublin: Wogan etc., 1797
- Genlis, Discours moraux et politiques sur divers sujets, et particulièrement sur l'éducation, 1797
- Genlis, Tales from the castle, London, 1798; Brattleborough, 1813
- Genlis, Les petits émigrés, ou Correspondance de quelques enfans: ouvrage fait pour servir à l'éducation de la jeunesse, Paris & Hamburg, 1798; 7e ed., Paris: Lecointe et Durey, 1825, 2v (@ Gallica)
- Genlis, Réflexions d'un ami des talens et des arts, Paris, an VII, 1798
- Genlis, Manuel du voyageur, ou recueil de dialogues, de lettres, etc., 2v, Berlin, 1798, 1799; in English, Paris, 1810
- Genlis, Manuel du voyageur ou Recueil de dialogues, de lettres, etc.; suivi d'un Itinéraire raisonné à l'usage des françois en Allemagne et des allemands en France / par Madame de Genlis; avec la trad. allemande par S. H. Catel. http://gallica.bnf.fr/scripts/ConsultationTout.exe?E=3D0&O=3DN102658
- Genlis, Les Voeux téméraires ou l'enthousiasme, 2v, Hambourg: Pierre Chateauneuf, 1798, 1799
- Genlis, Herbier moral ou receuil des fables nouvelles et autres pièces fugitives, 2v, Hambourg: Pierre Chateauneuf, 1799; Paris, 1800
- Genlis, Le petit La Bruyère, Hambourg: Fauche, 1799; Paris: Maradan, 1801
- Genlis, Les Mères rivales, ou la calomnie, 3v, Berlin: T. de la Garde, 1800; Paris, 1801; Paris: Maradan, 1819
- Genlis, La Bruyère the Less: or, Characters and manners of the children of the present age, Dublin, 1801
- Genlis, Nouvelle méthode d'enseignement pour la première jeunesse, Paris: Maradan, 1801
- Genlis, Nouvelles heures à l'usage des enfants, Paris: Maradan, 1801
- Genlis, Projet d'une école rurale pour l'éducation des filles, Paris, 1801
- Genlis, Contes, Bibliothèque des romans, Paris: Maradan, 1801
- Genlis, Mademoiselle de Clermont, Nouvelle historique, Paris: Maradan, An 10-1802; Paris, 1827, 1844, 1880, 1892
- Genlis, Mademoiselle de Clermont, Nouvelle historique, ed., Béatrice Didier, Paris: Regine Deforges, 1977
- Genlis, Nouveaux Contes moraux et Nouvelles historiques, 3v, Paris: Maradan, 1802; 1815–19
- Genlis, La Philosophie chrétienne, ou extraits tirés des ouvrages de Mme de Genlis terminés par plusieurs chapitres nouveaux (par Demonceaux), Paris, 1802
- Genlis, Nouvelles, Mercure, XIV, 1803
- Genlis, L'Epouse impertinente par air, suivie du Mari corrupteur et de La femme philosophe, Paris: Maradan, 1804
- Genlis, Les souvenirs de Félicie L., Paris: Maradan, 1804; Firmin-Didot, 1882
- Genlis, La duchesse de la Vallière, 2v, Paris: Maradan, 1804; 10e ed., 2v, Paris: Maradan, 1818; Paris, 1889, 1983
- Genlis, Réflexions sur la miséricorde de Dieu par Mme de la Vallière suivies de quelques lettres de la même..., Paris: Maradan, 1804
- Genlis, Nouvelles, Paris, 1804
- Genlis, Leçons, ou traité élémentaire de dessein..., Leipzig: J.C. Hinrichs, 1805 (Princeton)
- Genlis, Les Monuments religieux, ou description critique et détaillée des monuments religieux, tableaux, statues, qui se trouvent actuellement en Europe..., Paris: Maradan, 1805
- Genlis, Etude du coeur humain, d'après Barbier, Paris: Maradan, An XIII 1805
- Genlis, Le Comte de Corke ou la séduction sans artifice, suivie de six nouvelles, 2v, Paris: Maradan, 1805, 1819
- Genlis, Le duc de Lauzun, Paris, repr., London: H. Colburn, 1805 (Princeton)
- Genlis, L'Etude du coeur humain, suivi des cinq premières semaines d'un journal écrit sur les Pyrénées, Paris, 1805
- Genlis, Madame de Maintenon, pour servir de suite à l'histoire de Mlle de La Vallière, Paris: Maradan, 1806
- Genlis, Alphonsine, ou La tendresse maternelle, Paris: Maradan, 1806
- Genlis, Esprit de Mme de Genlis (par Demonceaux), Paris, 1806
- Genlis, Suite des souvenirs de Félicie (etc.), Paris: Maradan, 1807
- Genlis, Le siège de La Rochelle ou le Malheur de la conscience, Paris: Nicolle, 1807; : Maradan, 1818 (as opera, with Inchbald, Drury Lane, 1835
- Genlis, Bélisaire, Paris: Maradan, 1808; London, 1808; Baltimore, 1810
- Genlis, Sainclair, ou la victime des sciences et des arts, Paris: Maradan, 1808; London: Colburn, 1808; NY, 1813
- Genlis, The Affecting History of the Duchess of C, (from Adèle et Théodore, v2) NY: Borradaile, 1823; Poughkeepsie, 1809; NY: Duyckinck, 1814
- Genlis, Alphonse, ou Le fils naturel, Paris: Maradan, 1809
- Genlis, Arabesques mythologiques, ou Les attributs de toutes les divinités de la fable, 2v, Paris: Barrois, 1810
- Genlis, La botanique historique et littéraire, Paris: Maradan, 1810
- Genlis, La Maison rustique pour servir à l'éducation de la jeunesse: ou, Retour en France d'une famille émigrée, 3v, Paris, 1810
- Genlis, The traveller's companion; containing dialogues and models of letters... In six languages..., Paris: Barrois, 1810
- Genlis, De l'influence des femmes sur la littérature française comme protectrices des Lettres ou comme auteurs: Précis de l'histoire des femmes françaises les plus célèbres, Paris: Maradan, 1811
- Genlis, Observations critiques pour servir à l'histoire de la littérature française du XIXe siècle ou Réponse de Mme de Genlis à Messieurs T. et M. et sur les critiques de son dernier ouvrage..., Paris: Maradan, 1811
- Genlis, Examen critique de l'ouvrage intitulé: Biographie universelle, Paris: Maradan, 1811
- Genlis, Suite de l'examen critique de l'ouvrage intitulé: Biographie universelle, Paris: Maradan, 1812
- Genlis, Les bergères de Madian, ou La jeunesse de Moïse, Poème en prose, Paris: Galignani, 1812; Maradan, 1821
- Genlis, Mademoiselle de Lafayette ou le siècle de Louis XIII, 2v, Paris: Maradan, 1813
- Genlis, La Feuille des gens du Monde ou le Journal imaginaire, Paris: Eymery, 1813
- Genlis, Sainclair, or the victim to the arts and sciences, NY, 1813
- Genlis, Les hermites du Marais Pontins, Paris: Maradan, 1814
- Genlis, Histoire de Henri le Grand, 2v, Paris: Maradan, 1815
- Genlis, Les dimanches, ou journal de la jeunesse, Paris, 1dec1815-15fev1817
- Genlis, Jeanne de France: Nouvelle historique, 2v, Paris: Maradan, 1816
- Genlis, Le journal de la jeunesse, Paris, 1816
- Genlis, La religion considérée comme l'unique base du bonheur et de la véritable philosophie, nouvelle (4e) ed., augmentée de quelques notes, Paris: Maradan, 1816
- Genlis, Les Bat(t)uécas, 2v, Paris: Maradan, 1816
- Genlis, Les tableaux de M. le comte de Forbin, ou la mort de Pline l'Ancien et Inès de Castro, Paris: Maradan, 1817 (Ines de Castro, Paris, 1826, 1985 ISBN 2715805535)
- Genlis, Inès de Castro, Toulouse: Ombres, coll. "Petite bibliotheque Ombres", 1995, 160 p
- Genlis, Zuma, ou la découverte du quinquina, Paris: Maradan, 1817
- Genlis, Abrégé des Mémoires du marquis de Dangeau, Paris, 1817, 4v
- Genlis, Dictionnaire critique et raisonné des étiquettes de la cour, des usages du monde, des amusements, des modes, des moeurs, etc... depuis la mort de Louis XIII jusqu'à nos jours, Paris: Mongie, 1818
- Genlis, Les voyages poétiques d'Eugène et d'Antonine, Paris: Maradan, 1818
- Genlis, Almanach de la jeunesse en vers et en prose, Paris: Giroux, 1819
- Genlis, Alphonsine, ou La tendresse maternelle, Paris: Maradan, 1819
- Genlis, Les parvenus ou les aventures de Julien Delmours, 3v, Paris: C. Baecker, 1819; Lecointe et Durey, 1824
- Genlis, Pétrarque et Laure, 2v, Paris: Ladvocat, 1819; 3e ed., Paris: 1825
- Genlis, ed., Rousseau, Emile, 3v, Paris: Maradan, 1820, 3v
- Genlis, Petrarch and Laura, London, 1820, 2v in one
- Genlis, Petrarch and Laura, translated from the French, Sir Richard Phillips & Co 1820.
- Genlis, Catéchisme critique et moral de l'abbé Flévier de Reval (Feller), 2v, Paris, 1820
- Genlis, L'Intrépide, nos 1-9, Paris, 1820
- Genlis, ed., Voltaire, Le Siècle de Louis XIV, 3v, Paris?, 1820
- Genlis, Palmyre et Flaminie, ou, Le Secret, 2e ed., 2v, Paris: Maradan, 1821
- Genlis, Prières ou Manuel de piété proposé à tous les fidèles et particulièrement aux maisons d'Education, Paris: Maradan, 1821
- Genlis, Six nouvelles morales et religieuses, Paris: Janet, nd (1821)
- Genlis, Isaac, comédie en deux actes, Paris, 1821
- Genlis, Les jeux champêtres des Enfants: Contes de fées, Paris: Marc, nd (1821)
- Genlis, Les dîners du baron d'Holbach, Paris: Trouvé, 1822
- Genlis, Les veillées de la chaumière, Paris: Lecointe, 1823
- Genlis, Mémoires de la marquise de Bonchamps sur la Vendée, Paris, 1823
- Genlis, Les Prisonniers, contenant six nouvelles..., Paris: Bertrand, 1824
- Genlis, De l'emploi du temps, Paris: Bertrand, 1824
- Genlis, Les Athées conséquents ou Mémoires du commandeur de Linanges, Paris: Trouvé, 1824
- Genlis, "Notice sur Carmontel" in Proverbes et comédies posthumes de Carmontel, Paris: Ladvocat, 1825
- Genlis, Mémoires inédits, 10v, Paris: Ladvocat, 1825-28 *ZAN-T3340 Reel 130-31 No. 853
- Genlis, Théresina ou l'Enfant de la Providence, Paris: Ladvocat, 1826
- Genlis, Le La Bruyère des domestiques, 2v, Paris: Thiercelin, 1828
- Genlis, Le dernier voyage de Nelgis ou Mémoires d'un vieillard, Paris: Roux, 1828
- Genlis, Eugène and Lolotte, a tale for children, Boston, 1828
- Genlis, Etrennes politiques pour 1828. Lettre au duc d'Orléans, Paris, 1828
- Genlis, Les Soupers de la Maréchale de Luxembourg, 2e ed., Paris: Roux, 1828, 3v
- Genlis, Manuel de la jeune femme: Guide complet de la maîtresse de maison, Paris: Béchet, 1829
- Genlis, Athénaïs, ou le chateau de Coppet en 1807, Paris, 1832
- Genlis, Lettres de Madame de Genlis à son fils adoptif, in Minerva, Paris, 1903
- Genlis, Madame de Genlis et la Grande-Duchesse Elisa, Paris: Paul, 1912
- Genlis, Mémoires, Paris: Barba, 18??
- Genlis, Mémoires de Madame de Genlis (en un volume), Paris: Firmin-Didot, 1878
- Genlis, The Unpublished correspondence of Mme de Genlis and Margaret Chinnery and related documents in the Chinnery family papers, Oxford: Voltaire Foundation, SVEC 2003:02), ed., Denise Yim.

== Sources ==
- Hertz, Deborah (2005). Jewish High Society In Old Regime Berlin. Syracuse University Press. ISBN 978-0815629559.
- Mather, Laura (2017). The Life and Networks of Pamela Fitzgerald, 1773-1831. Mary Immaculate College, Limerick.
- Pattou, Etienne. "Famille de Brûlart & Sillery, Genlis, etc, Page 15" (PDF). Racines Histoires.
- Wahba, Magdi (Summer 1961). "Madame de Genlis in England". Comparative Literature. 13 (3): 221–238. doi:10.2307/1768999. JSTOR 1768999.
- Watson, Geri (14 December 2016). "Madame de Genlis and Jane Austen". GeriWalton.com.

== Bibliography ==
- Dobson, Austin (1895). "Madame de Genlis". Four Frenchwomen. New York: Dodd, Mead, & Co. pp. 107–207.
- Wyndham, Violet. Madame de Genlis: A Biography. NY: Roy Publishers, 1958
- Laborde, A.M. L'Oeuvre de Madame de Genlis. Paris: Nizet, 1966
- Grosperrin, Bernard. "Un manuel d'éducation noble: Adèle et Théodore de Mme de Genlis," Cahiers d'Histoire XIX (1974), pp. 343–352 |year=1974
- Broglie, Gabriel de. Madame de Genlis. Paris: Librairie académique Perrin, 1985
- Brown, Penny. "‘La femme enseignante’: Madame de Genlis and the moral and didactic tale in France," Bulletin of the John Rylands University Library of Manchester, 76:3(Autumn, 1994), p. 23-42.
- Douthwaite, Julia. The Wild Girl, Natural Man, and the Monster: Dangerous Experiments in the Age of Enlightenment. Chicago: University of Chicago Press, 2002.
- Dow, Gillian. "Stéphanie-Félicité de Genlis and the French Historical Novel in Romantic Britain." Women’s Writing 19.3 (2012): 273-92. https://dx.doi.org/10.1080/09699082.2012.666414
- Everdell, William R. (1987). Christian Apologetics in France: The Roots of Romantic Religion. Lewiston, NY: Edwin Mellen Press.
- Everdell, William R. (1992). Women Apologists for Religion: Madame De Genlis and Madame Leprince de Beaumont. East Central American Society for Eighteenth-Century Studies.
- Plagnol, Marie-Emmanuelle. "Le théâtre de Mme de Genlis. Une morale chrétienne sécularisée." Dix-huitième siècle, 24(1992): 367-382.
- Robb, Bonnie Arden. Félicité de Genlis: Motherhood in the Margins. University of Delaware Press, 1995
- Robb, Bonnie Arden. "Madame de Maintenon and the Literary Personality of Madame de Genlis: Creating Fictional, Historical, and Narrative Virtue," Eighteenth-Century Fiction, 7:4(July 1995), p. 351-372.
- Ruwe, Donelle. "The British Reception of Genlis’s Adèle et Théodore, Preceptive Fiction and the Professionalization of Handmade Literacies." Writing Women (2017), p. 1-16. https://dx.doi.org/10.1080/09699082.2017.1323385
- Schaneman, Judith Clark. "Rewriting Adèle et Théodore: Intertextual Connections Between Madame de Genlis and Ann Radcliffe." Comparative Literature Studies 38.1 (2001): 31-45.
- Plagnol-Diéval, Marie-Emmanuelle. Madame de Genlis, Bibliographie des écrivains français, v6, Paris/Rome: Memini |year=1996.
- Yim, Denise. "Madame de Genlis's Adèle et Théodore: Its Influence on an English Family's Education." Australian Journal of French Studies 38 (2001): 141-57.
