= Val-de-Grâce =

HIA Val-de-Grâce
- French Defence Health Service
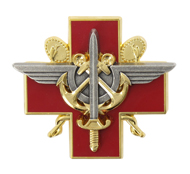

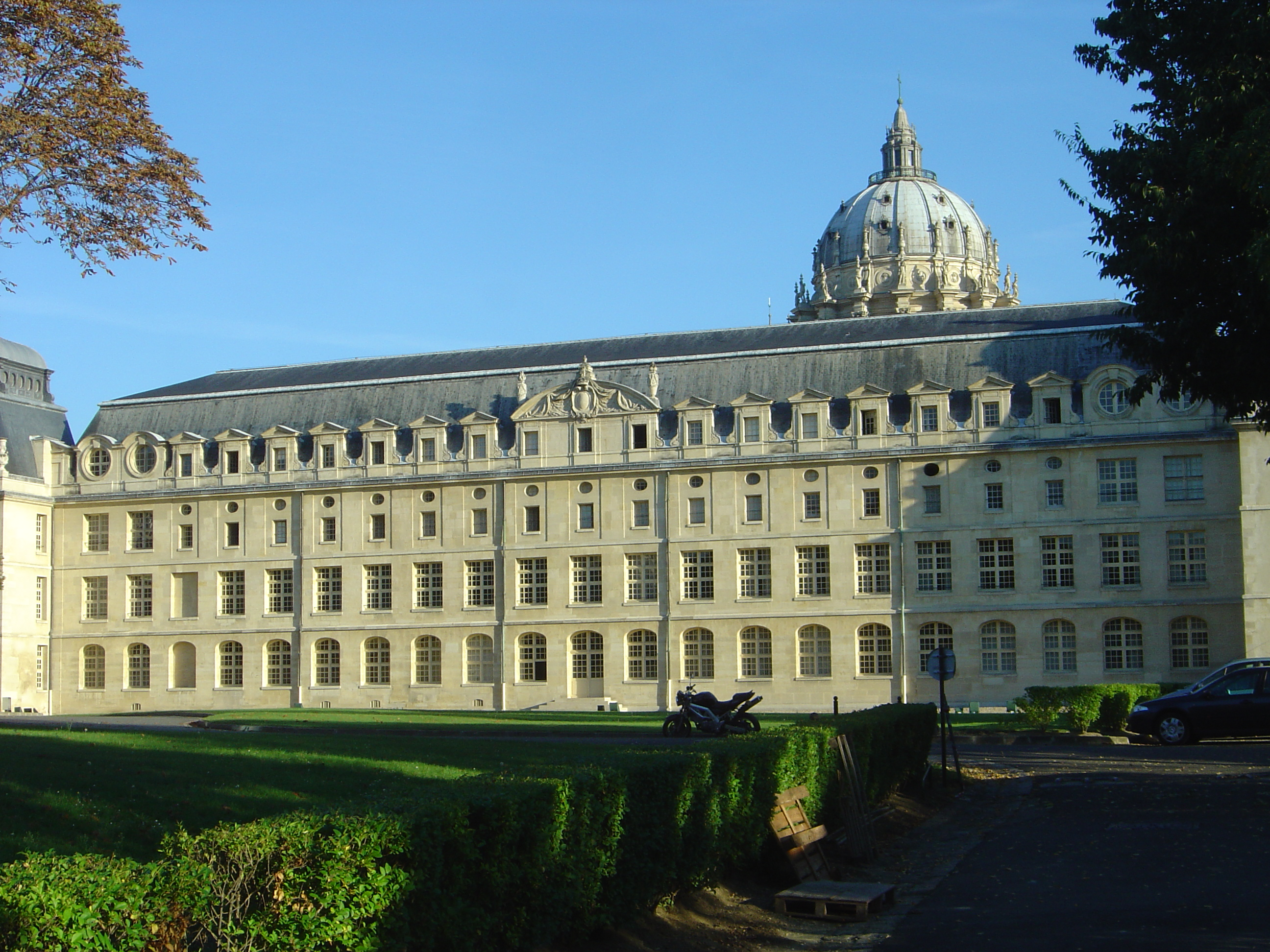
- The Old Buildings of Val-de-Grâce

- Val-de-Grâce shown within the petite couronne

Geography
- Location: 74 boulevard de Port-Royal, Paris 5^{e}, Île-de-France, France
- Coordinates: 48°50′21″N 2°20′40″E

Organisation
- Type: Teaching

Services
- Beds: 350

History
- Founded: 30 floréal an IV (19 May 1796)

The Val-de-Grâce (French pronunciation: [val də ɡʁɑs]; Hôpital d'instruction des armées du Val-de-Grâce or HIA Val-de-Grâce) was a military hospital located at 74 boulevard de Port-Royal in the 5th arrondissement of Paris, France. It was closed as a hospital in 2016.

== History ==
The church of the Val-de-Grâce was built by order of Queen Anne of Austria, wife of Louis XIII. After the birth of her son Louis XIV after 23 years of childless marriage, Anne showed her gratitude to the Virgin Mary by building a church on the land of a Benedictine convent. Louis XIV is said to have laid the cornerstone for the Val-de-Grâce in a ceremony that took place 1 April 1645, when he was seven years old.

The church of the Val-de-Grâce, designed by François Mansart and Jacques Lemercier, is considered by some as Paris's best example of baroque architecture (curving lines, elaborate ornamentation, and harmony of different elements). Construction began in 1645 and was completed in 1667.

The Benedictine nuns provided medical care for injured revolutionaries during the French Revolution, and thus the church at Val-de-Grâce was spared much of the desecration and vandalism that plagued other, more famous Paris churches. Notre-Dame, by contrast, was looted and used as a warehouse, and Saint-Eustache was used as a barn. As a result, the church's exquisite interior is one of the few unspoiled remnants of Paris's pre-Revolution grandeur. Following the Revolution, the buildings were converted into a military hospital.

The original buildings serve only for offices and teaching facilities (École d'application du Service de santé des armées); the medical facilities are inside a large modern building to the east on the same grounds.

The replacement hospital was built in the 1970s and completed in 1979. It has a capacity of 350 beds, in various specialties. The hospital is accessible to military personnel in need of medical aid as well as to any person with health coverage under the French social security system. It is famous for being the place where the top officials of the French Republic generally receive treatment.

In the courtyard stands a statue of Dominique Jean Larrey sculpted by David d'Angers in 1843, who was Napoleon's personal surgeon and an innovator in the concept of battlefield triage.

The old abbey alongside the church is now a museum of French army medicine. Tours of the museum and church are available for a small fee. As a military facility, the grounds are under military guard and tourists are escorted. Cameras are not permitted except for inside the church itself.

The last emperor of Vietnam, Bảo Đại, died at the modern Val-de-Grâce hospital on 30 July 1997, aged 83.

=== People buried at Val-de-Grâce ===
Val-de-Grâce was later the traditional burial place for members of the House of Orléans, a cadet branch of the House of Bourbon:

- Mademoiselle de Valois (1693–94), daughter of Philippe II, Duke of Orléans
- Louis, Duke of Orléans (1703–52)
- Margravine Auguste of Baden-Baden, duchesse d'Orléans (1704–26)
- Philippine Élisabeth d'Orléans, Mademoiselle de Beaujolais (1711-1731)
- Louise Marie, Mademoiselle (1726–28), daughter of Margravine Auguste who died in childbirth giving birth to Louise Marie
- Louis Philippe (1725–85), son of Louis
- Louise Henriette de Bourbon (1726–59), wife of the above
- Françoise Marie de Bourbon (1677–1749), only her heart was buried here

== Gallery ==
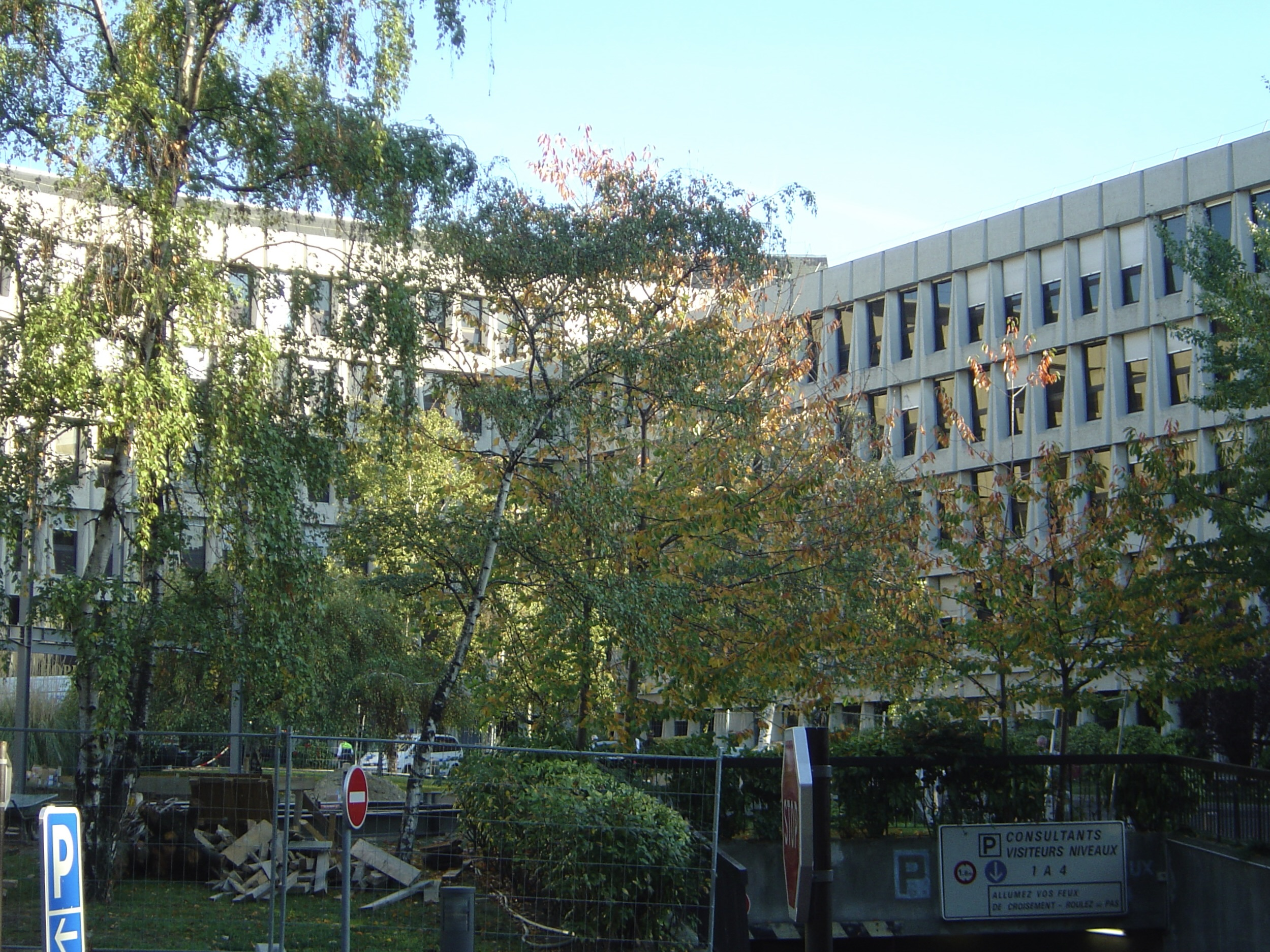
Modern hospital

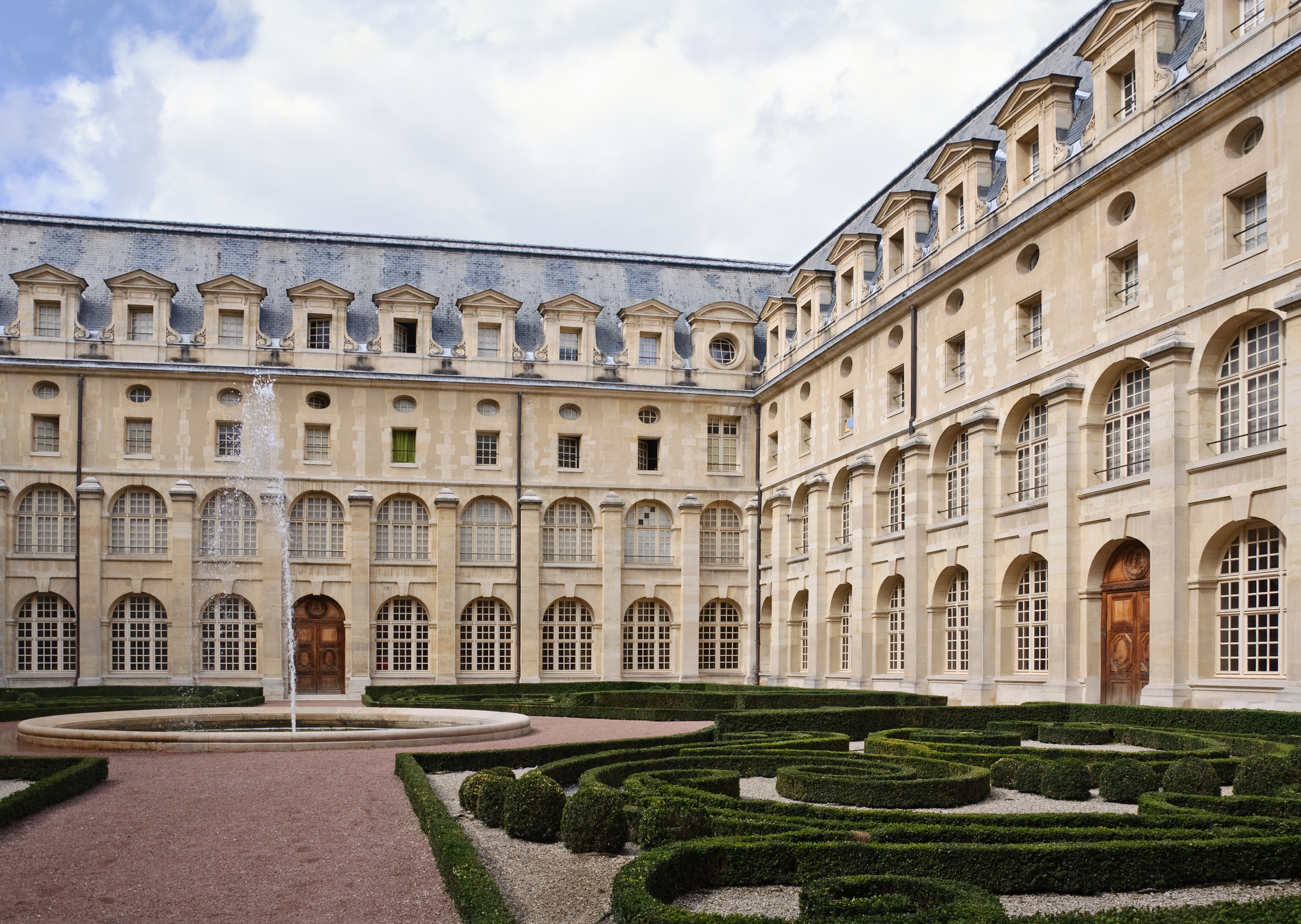
Former abbey of Val-de-Grâce in Paris: view of the cloister and its French formal garden

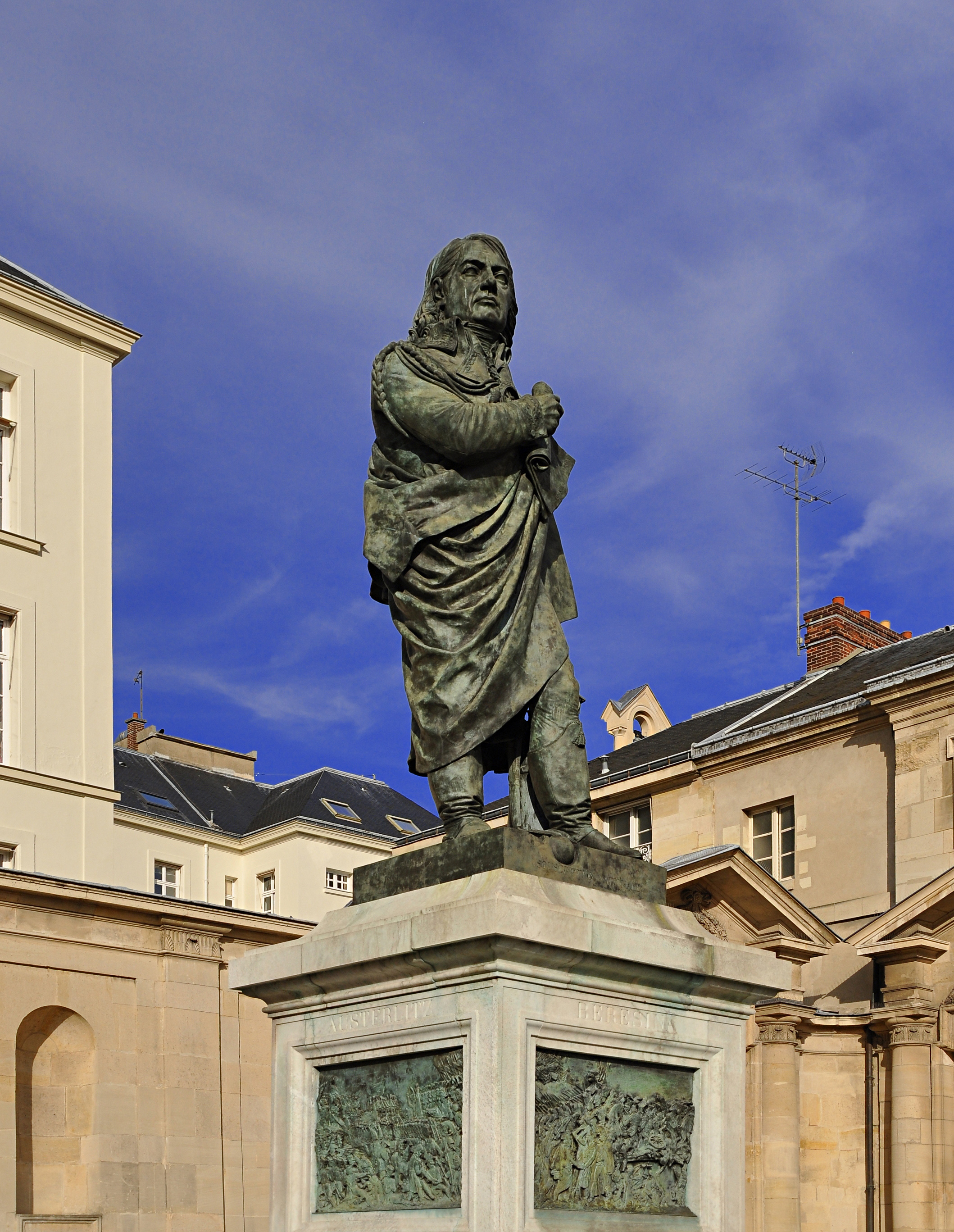
Statue of Dominique Jean Larrey, sculpted by David d'Angers in 1843

== See also ==
- French Defence Health service
- List of hospitals in France
