= Jacques-Antoine-Marie Lemoine =

French painter

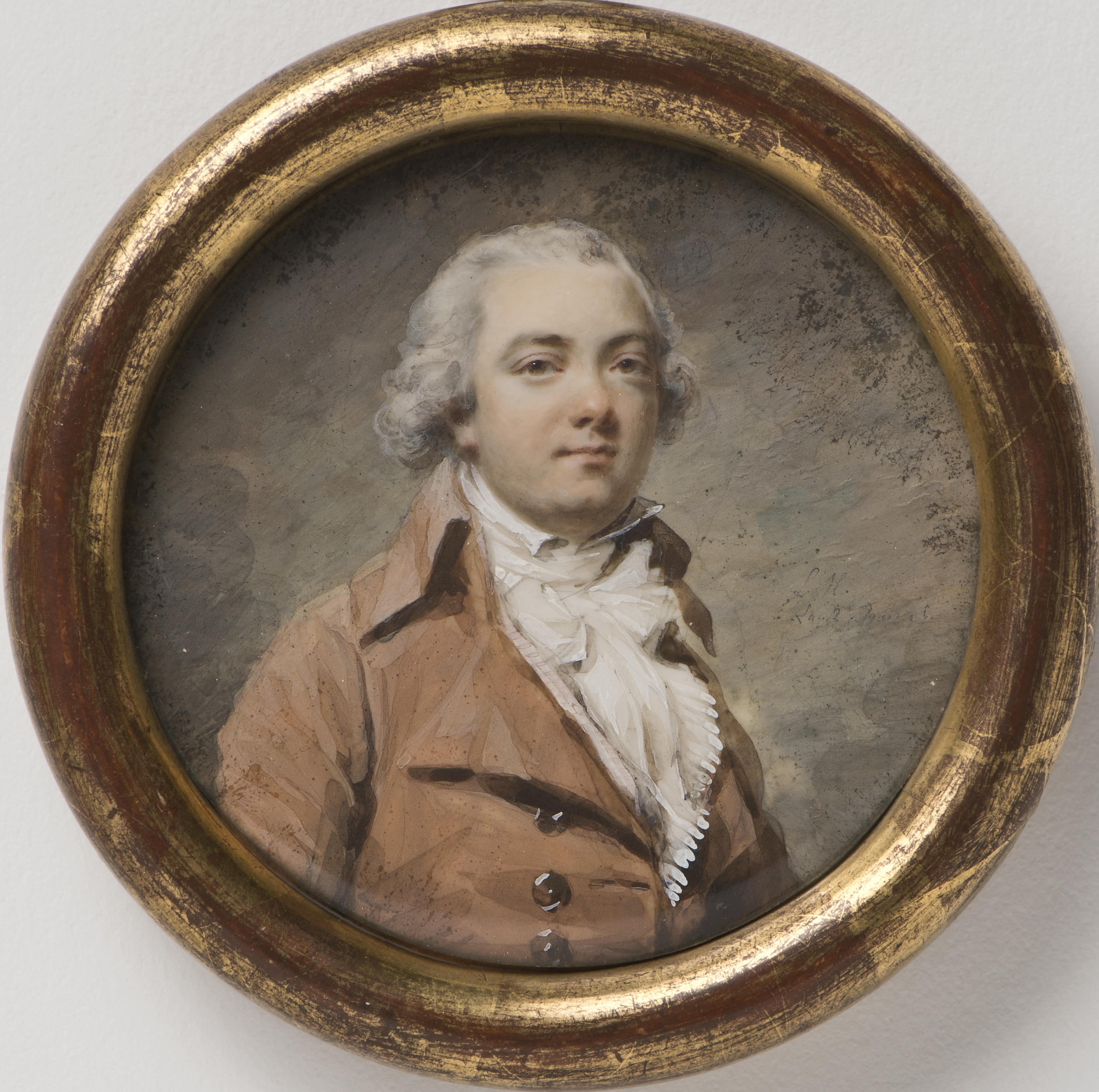
Jacques-Antoine-Marie Lemoine, Self-portrait (Stockholm, Nationalmuseum)

Jacques-Antoine-Marie Lemoine, also Lemoyne (17 July 1751 – 7 February 1824), was a French artist, known primarily for portraiture.

Lemoine was born in Rouen. He declined to follow his father's precedent in becoming a notary, and instead began study at the École des Beaux-Arts in Rouen. Having moved to Paris by 1772, he studied under Jean-Jacques Lagrenée (1737–1821) and Maurice-Quentin de la Tour (1704–1788). He was attracted to Parisian theater and music, and early in his career often portrayed actors, singers, and musicians, using pastels and chalk. He also worked in oil, watercolor, and porcelain. In the late 1770s or early 1780s, he may have sketched for fashion plates.

In 1783, Lemoine married the artist Agathe-Françoise Bonvallet. He began his work as a miniaturist in the mid-1780s. His early miniatures are influenced by the "free and painterly technique" of Pierre-Adolphe Hall. In 1785, he painted Louise Benoît Zamor, the page of Madame du Barry and later revolutionary. The portrait is one piece of evidence for Zamor's African origin.

Lemoine invented a perspective easel for use in landscape painting, and another device to help create likenesses in portraiture. He also collected texts on geometry and perspective in relation to design and painting.

Lemoine's wife died in 1794, and he returned to Rouen, where he was appointed professor of drawing at the École de Marine in 1799. After 1798, he produced few works, but kept a pied-à-terre in Paris and continued to exhibit at the Salons through 1817. He died at his home in Paris, and bequeathed his manuscript collection to the state.

Germaine Greer points out that because Marie-Victoire Lemoine sometimes signed her works "Lemoine," the works of the two artists may sometimes be misattributed.

== Gallery ==
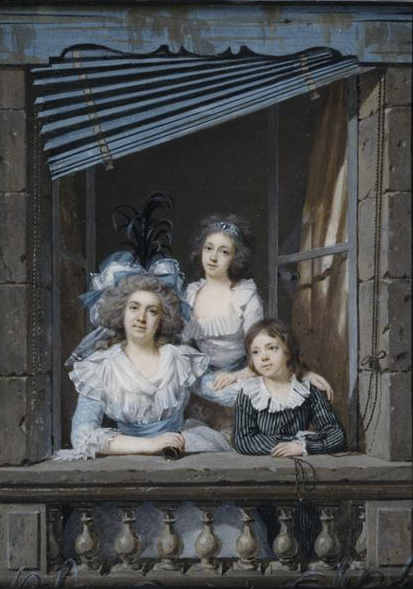
Portrait of a Woman with Her Son and Daughter in a Balcony Window (1787), an oil painting by Jacques-Antoine-Marie Lemoine

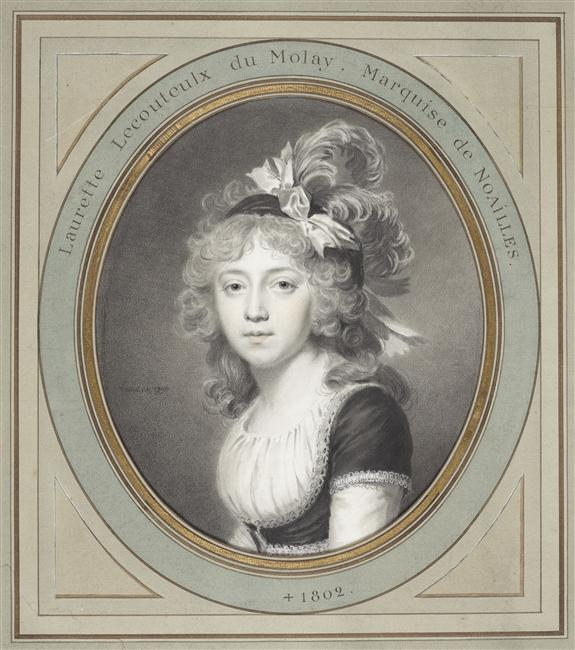
Pauline Laurette Le Couteulx du Molay (1776 - 1802), daughter of Jacques-Jean Le Couteulx du Molay, 1796

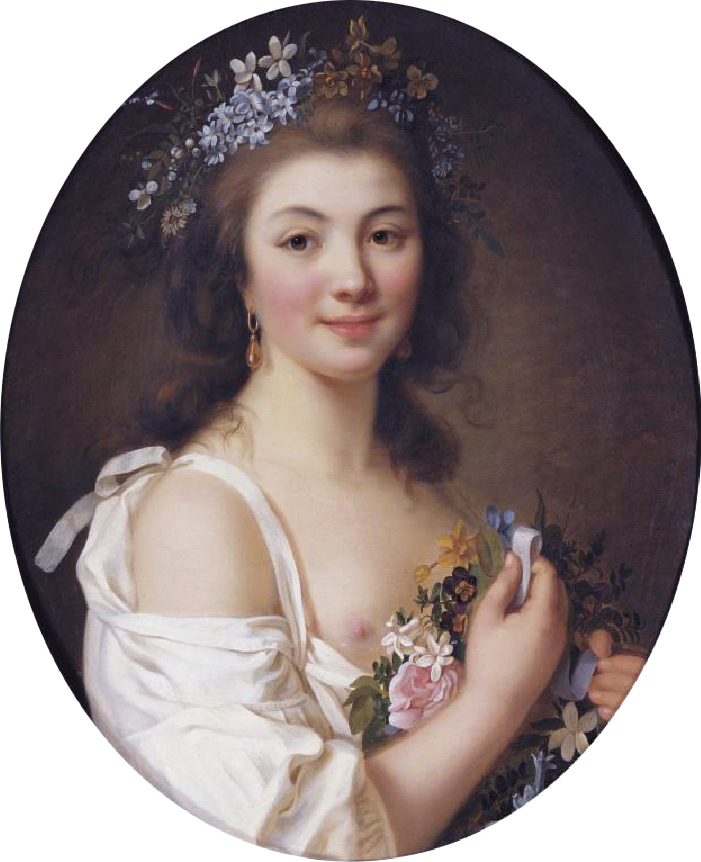
Madame de Genlis, 1781
