= Louis Philippe I, Duke of Orléans =

French royal (1725–1785)

Louis Philippe I
- First Prince of the Blood; Duke of Orléans
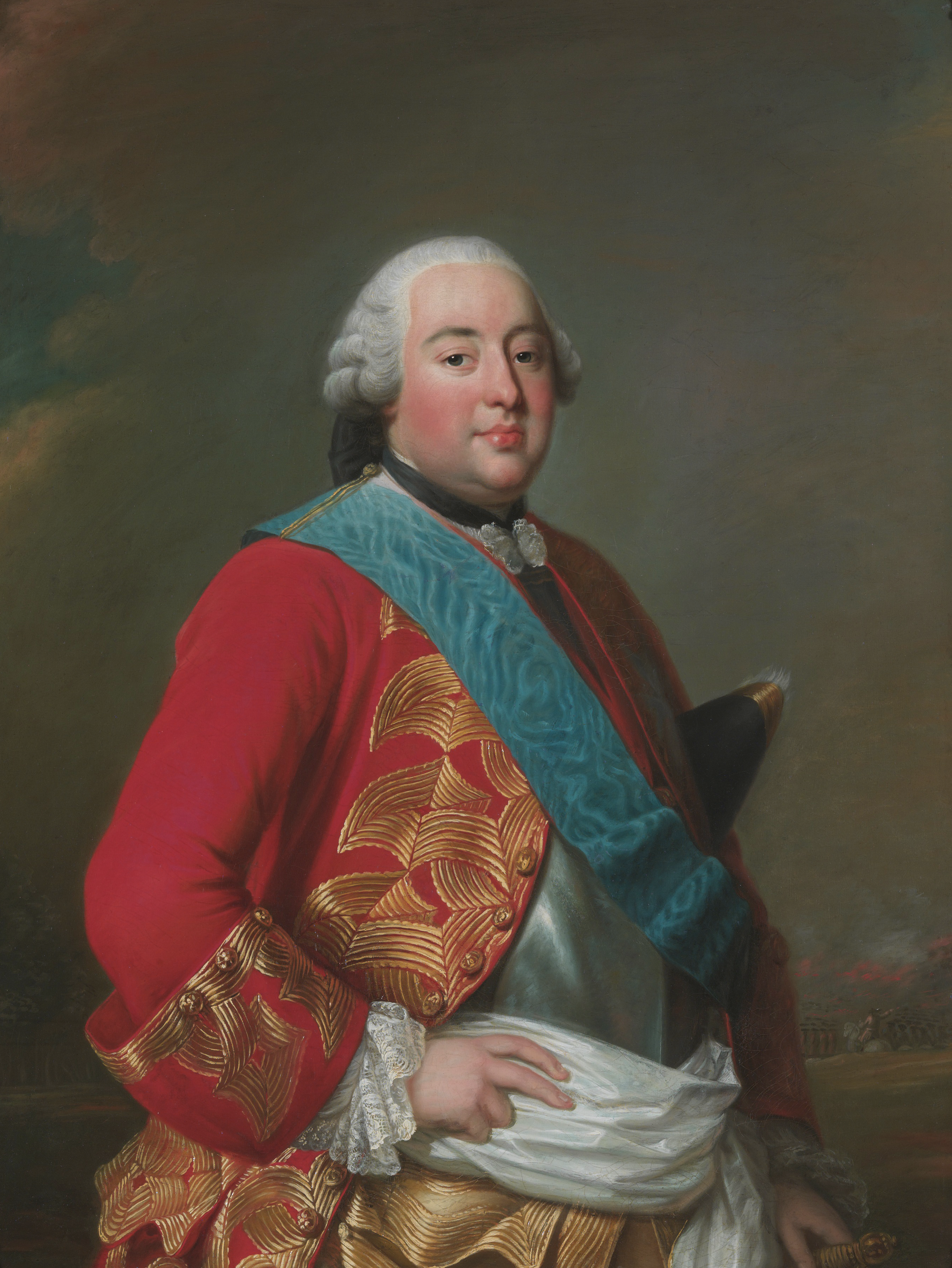
- Portrait by Alexander Roslin, c. 1770
- Born: Louis Philippe d'Orléans, Duke of Chartres; 12 May 1725; Palace of Versailles, France
- Died: 18 November 1785 (aged 60); Château de Sainte-Assise à Seine-Port, France
- Burial: Val-de-Grâce, Paris
- Spouse: Louise Henriette de Bourbon (m. 1743; died 1759) Charlotte Béraud de La Haye de Riou (m. 1773)
- Issue: Louis Philippe II, Duke of Orléans; Bathilde, Princess of Condé
- House: Orléans
- Father: Louis, Duke of Orléans
- Mother: Margravine Auguste of Baden-Baden
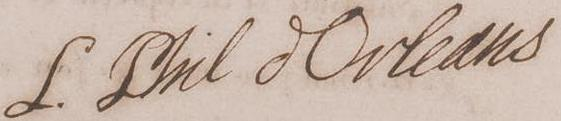
- Signature

Louis Philippe I, Duke of Orléans (12 May 1725 – 18 November 1785), known as le Gros (the Fat), was a French royal of a cadet branch of the House of Bourbon. The First Prince of the Blood after 1752, he was the most senior male at the French court after the immediate royal family. He was the father of Philippe Égalité. He greatly augmented the already huge wealth of the House of Orléans.

== Biography ==
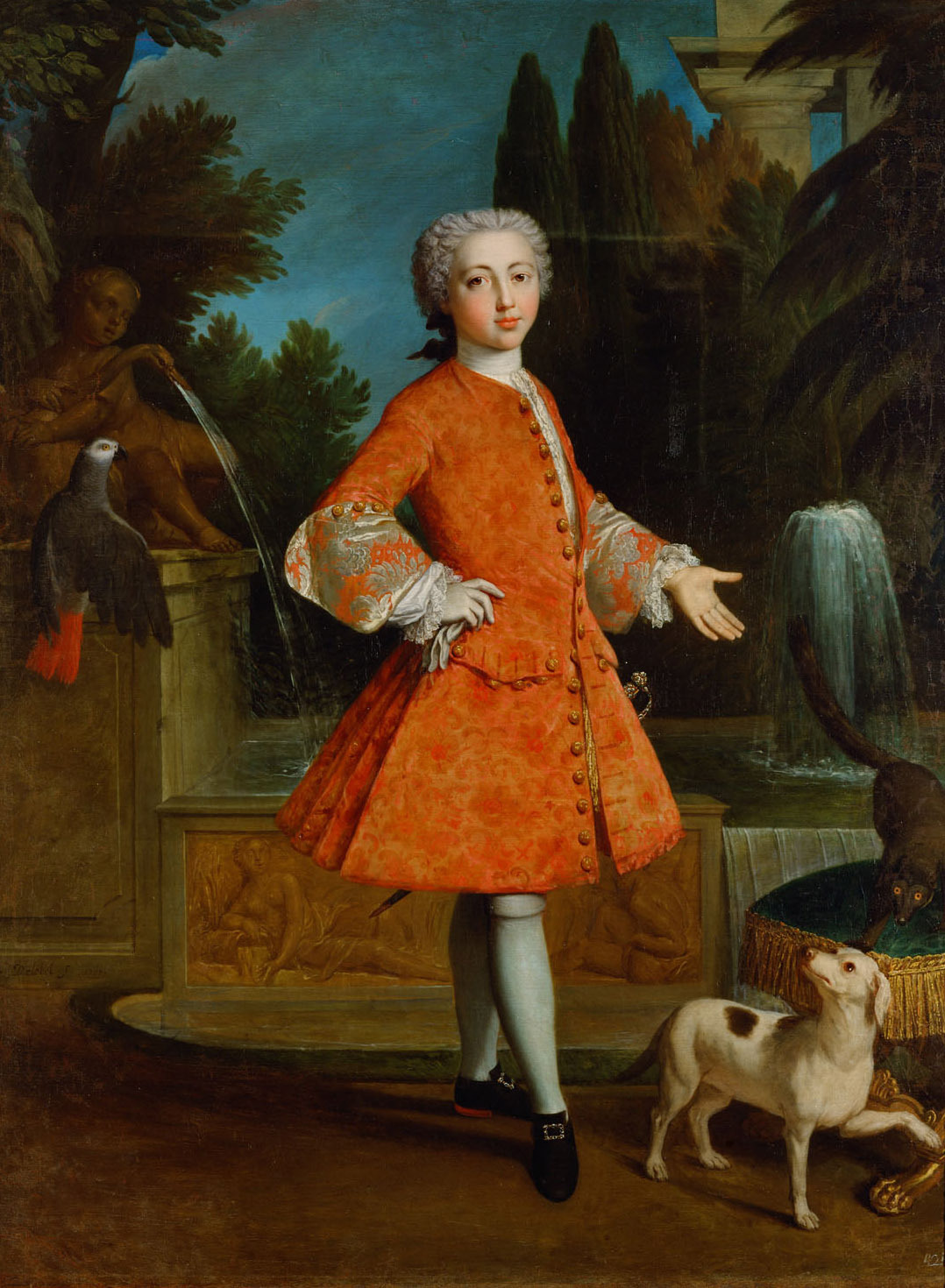
Louis Philippe aged 12 (portrait by Nicolas Delobel, 1737)

Louis Philippe d'Orléans was born at the Palace of Versailles on 12 May 1725. As the only son of Louis, Duke of Orléans, and his wife Johanna of Baden-Baden, he was titled Duke of Chartres at birth. He was one of two children; his younger sister Louise Marie d'Orléans was born in 1726, and her mother died three days after giving birth. Louis Philippe's father, who had been devoted to his wife, became a recluse and pious as he grew older.

Louise Marie, who died at Saint-Cloud in 1728 aged a year and eight months, was known as Mademoiselle in her short lifetime.

Louis Philippe was hardly fifteen when he and his young cousin Princess Henriette of France (1727–1752), the second daughter of King Louis XV and Queen Marie Leszczyńska, fell in love. After considering the possibility of such a marriage, Louis XV and his chief minister, Cardinal Fleury, decided against it because this union would have brought the House of Orléans too close to the throne.

=== First marriage ===
In 1743, his paternal grandmother, Françoise-Marie de Bourbon the formidable Dowager Duchess of Orléans, and Louise Élisabeth, Dowager Princess of Conti arranged his marriage to his seventeen-year-old cousin, Louise Henriette de Bourbon (1726–1759), a member of the House of Bourbon-Conti, another cadet branch of the House of Bourbon. It was hoped this marriage would close a fifty-year-old family rift.

Louis Philippe's father, Louis le Pieux, gave his consent to the union in the belief that because the young bride had been brought up in a convent, she would be a paragon of virtue and as such be an ideal wife for his son. Louise Henriette was the only daughter of Louis Armand de Bourbon, Prince of Conti and the earlier mentioned Louise Élisabeth de Bourbon. Louise Henriette was a Princess of the Blood (princesse du sang) and was known at court as Mademoiselle de Conti.

The couple was married on 17 December 1743 in the chapel of the Palace of Versailles.

After a few months of a passion that surprised everyone at court, the couple started to drift apart as the young Duchess of Chartres began to lead a scandalous life. This caused her father-in-law to refuse to recognise the legitimacy of his grandchildren.

The couple had three children:

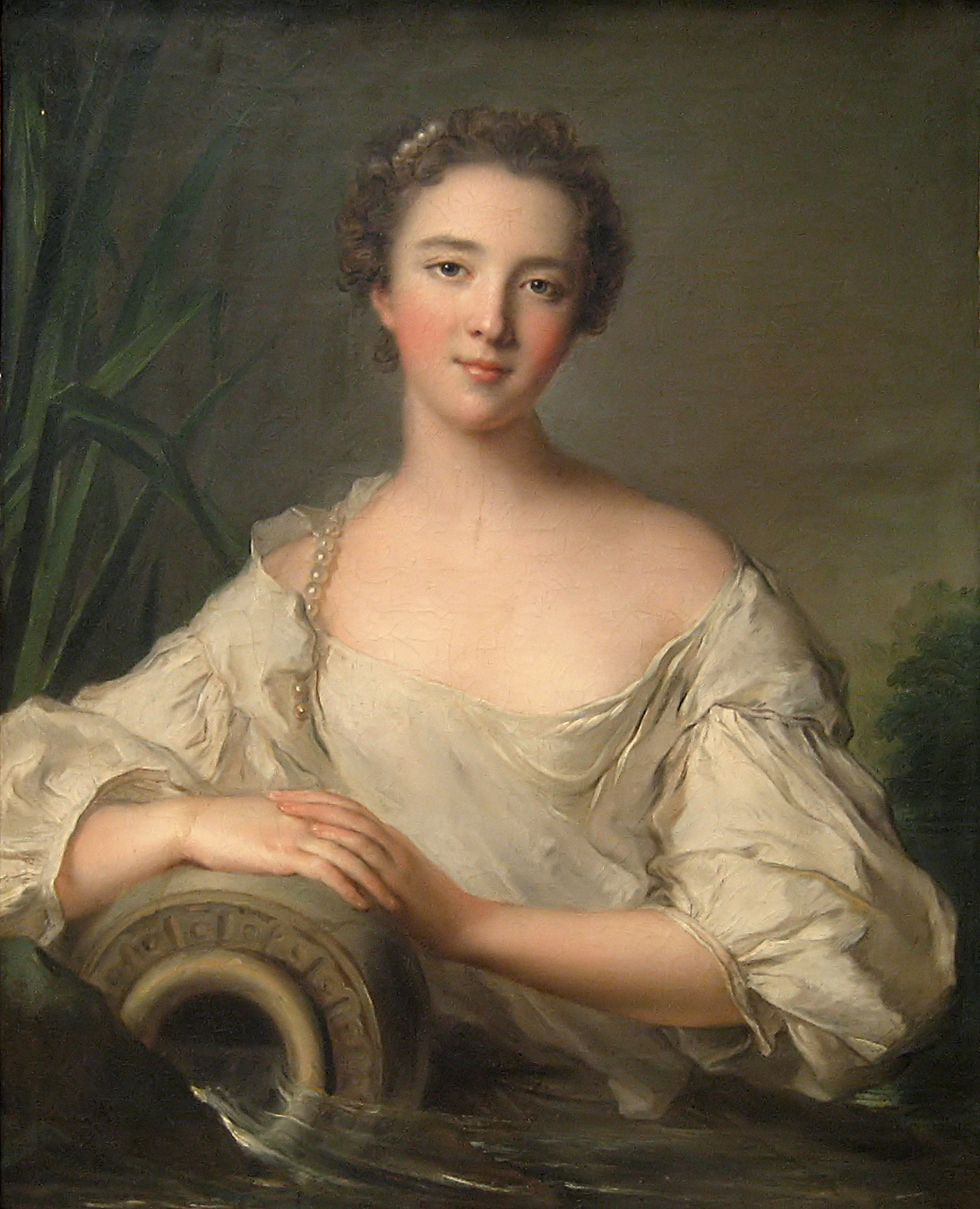
Louise Henriette as the Duchess of Chartres, Jean-Marc Nattier.

- A daughter (Château de Saint-Cloud, 12 or 13 July 1745 – 14 December 1745, Château de Saint-Cloud);
- Louis Philippe Joseph d'Orléans (Château de Saint-Cloud, 13 April 1747, – 6 November 1793, Place de la Révolution, Paris (executed)), who succeeded his father as Duke of Orléans in 1785,
  - Duke of Montpensier at birth,
  - Duke of Chartres at the death of his grandfather in 1752,
  - Duke of Orléans at the death of his father in 1785,
  - known as Philippe-Égalité during the French Revolution;
  - possible husband for Princess Maria Kunigunde of Saxony (1740–1826), youngest daughter of Augustus III of Poland;
  - married Louise Marie Adélaïde de Bourbon, Mademoiselle de Penthièvre, and was the father of Louis-Philippe King of the French;
- Louise Marie Thérèse Bathilde d'Orléans (Château de Saint-Cloud, 9 July 1750 – 10 January 1822, Paris), the last princesse de Condé,
  - possible bride for Ferdinand, Duke of Parma,
  - married Louis Henry II, Prince of Condé,
  - known as Mademoiselle at court prior to her marriage,
  - known as Citoyenne Vérité during the French Revolution.

Because he knew that Louise Henriette was having affairs during her marriage and felt that Louis Philippe was physically incapable of having children, Louise Henriette's father-in-law refused to acknowledge any of her children as legitimate.

In 1756, the Swiss physician and advocate for inoculation against smallpox Théodore Tronchin was invited to the court of Louis XV at the request of Louis Philippe, who was in favour of inoculation. Louis Philippe wanted to have both his children inoculated in order to demonstrate the safety and effectiveness of the methods, but his wife Louise Henriette was against it. However, after Louis Philippe promised not to have the children inoculated without her consent, she agreed to the procedure, and Philippe and Bathilde were inoculated on March 12, 1756.

=== Military achievements and succession as Duke of Orléans ===
Serving with the French armies in the War of the Austrian Succession, he distinguished himself in the campaigns of 1742, 1743 and 1744, and at the Battle of Fontenoy in 1745. Louise Henriette accompanied her husband to the field despite being pregnant. After the death of his first wife, he retired to his château at Bagnolet, where he occupied his time with theatrical performances and the society of intellectuals.

Upon the death of his father in Paris on 4 August 1752, Louis Philippe became Duke of Orléans and head of the House of Orléans. He also became First Prince of the Blood, Duke of Valois, Nemours and Montpensier. His father was buried at the Abbaye-Sainte-Geneviève where he had lived since 1740.

=== Étiennette Le Marquis ===
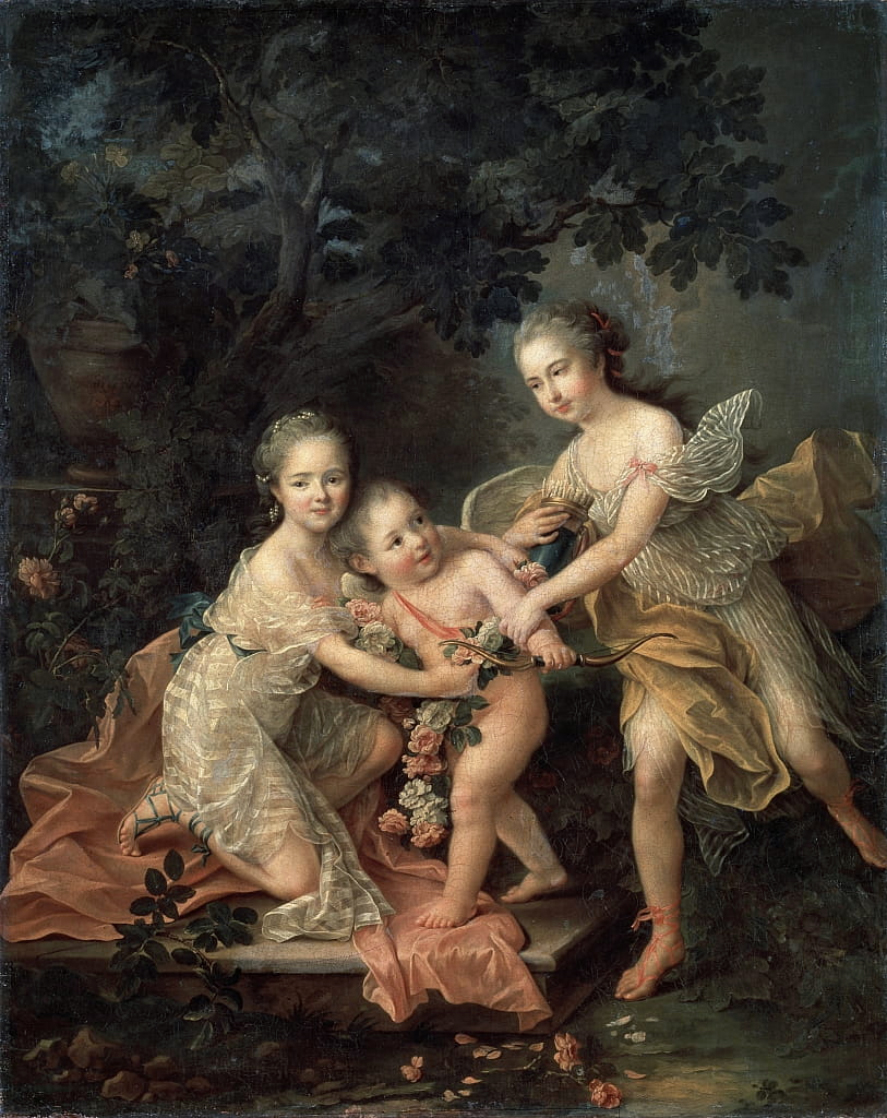
Children of the Duke of Orléans (c.1755); Bathilde holds an angel with her brother, the Duke of Chartres, is on the far right, François-Hubert Drouais.

After the death of Louise Henriette on 9 February 1759 at the Palais-Royal, the Orléans residence in Paris, Louis Philippe took as his mistress Étiennette Le Marquis, a former dancer who liked to act in comedy plays, and who introduced him into the world of the theater. At that time, the château de Bagnolet, which he had inherited from his father, became his favorite residence. Louis Philippe had three children with Étiennette; they were raised under the care of the Orléans family:

- Louis Étienne d'Orléans, (21 January 1759 – 24 July 1825), Count-abbé of Saint-Phar
- Louis Philippe d'Orléans, (7 July 1761 – 13 June 1829), Count-abbé of Saint-Albin,
- Marie Étiennette Perrine d'Auvilliers, (7 July 1761 -), who married François-Constantin, Count of Brossard, a dragoon regiment officer.

In 1769, Louis Philippe sold Bagnolet and bought the Château du Raincy, located less than ten miles east from the center of Paris. The same year, his son Louis Philippe, married Louise Marie Adélaïde de Bourbon, heiress to the fortune of her father, the Duke of Penthièvre. Louis Philippe had wanted his son to have a prestigious marriage with the Polish princess Maria Kunigunde, the youngest daughter of Augustus III of Poland and Maria Josepha, Archduchess of Austria. Princess Maria Kunigunde was the sister of the deceased Dauphine of France (1731–1767), mother of Louis XVI.

It was King Louis XV who opposed this marriage on the pretence that the princess was too old for the young Duke of Chartres. This caused the Duke of Penthièvre to ask if the Duke of Orléans if he would allow a union with the Orléans family. Louis Philippe is said to have rejected the idea of his son marrying Mademoiselle de Penthièvre due to her bastard race; this is an irony in itself due to Louis Philippe and the Duke of Penthièvre were both descended from two daughters of Louis XIV and Madame de Montespan.

=== Second marriage ===
In spite of his liaison with Étiennette, Louis Philippe had several other mistresses until he met, in July 1766, Charlotte Jeanne Béraud de La Haye de Riou, Madame de Montesson, a witty but married twenty-eight-year-old. After the death of the Marquis of Montesson in 1769, Louis Philippe tried to obtain Louis XV's authorisation to marry the young widow. Finally, in December 1772, the King gave his consent on the condition that the Marquise of Montesson would never become Duchess of Orléans or succeed to any other Orléans titles. In addition, the couple was to live a quiet life away from the court. The morganatic marriage took place on 23 April 1773 "dans la plus stricte intimité". As a wedding gift, the Duke of Orléans gave his new wife the château de Sainte-Assise at Seine-Port, in today's Seine-et-Marne department of France.

=== Later life ===
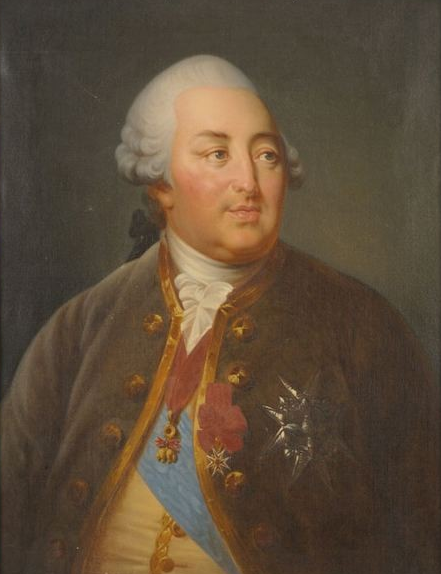
Portrait after Élisabeth Vigée Le Brun (1779)

Louis XV had added to the appanage of the House of Orléans the hôtel de Grand-Ferrare in Fontainebleau (1740), the county of Soissons (1751), the seigneuries of La Fère, Marle, Ham, Saint-Gobain, the Canal de l'Ourcq and the hôtel Duplessis-Châtillon in Paris (1766).

In 1773, Orléans added to his residences a magnificent hôtel built at Chaussée d'Antin, the new elegant quarter of Paris.

In 1780, Louis Philippe gave his son the Palais-Royal, a gift that was to mark their reconciliation after the rift provoked by the Duke's second marriage.

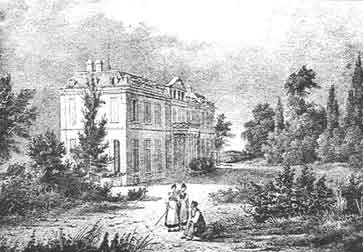
The Château de Sainte-Assise

In Sainte-Assise, du Raincy and Paris, the couple received nobles, intellectuals, playwrights, scientists, such as the Duchess of Lauzun, the Countess of Egmont, the Marquis of Lusignan, the Marquis of Osmond, the mathematician d'Alembert, the German writer Melchior Grimm, the mathematician and astronomer Pierre-Simon de Laplace, the chemist Claude Louis Berthollet, the composers Pierre-Alexandre Monsigny, André Grétry, Chevalier de Saint-Georges, Wolfgang Amadeus Mozart, and playwright Louis Carrogis Carmontelle. The couple also gave theatrical presentations, some of which were written by the Marquise of Montesson.

In February 1785, upon the insistence of Louis XVI, and with some help from Madame du Barry, the Duke of Orléans sold the magnificent Château de Saint-Cloud, which had been in the Orléans family's possession since 1658, to Queen Marie Antoinette, for six million livres, a much reduced price than the original cost. The beautiful château had been ignored after the death of his wife Louise Henriette.

Surrounded by all the members of his immediate family, even his three children by Etiennette Le Marquis, Louis-Philippe died on 18 November 1785, at Sainte-Assise at the age of sixty.

He was buried at the Val-de-Grâce convent in Paris, built by his ancestor Anne of Austria to celebrate the birth of Louis XIV of France, Louis Philippe's great grandfather.

== Ancestors ==
Ancestors of Louis Philippe I, Duke of Orléans

8. Philippe I, Duke of Orléans
4. Philippe II, Duke of Orléans
9. Elizabeth Charlotte of the Palatinate
2. Louis, Duke of Orléans
10. Louis XIV
5. Françoise Marie de Bourbon
11. Madame de Montespan
1. Louis Philippe I, Duke of Orléans
12. Ferdinand Maximilian of Baden-Baden
6. Louis William, Margrave of Baden-Baden
13. Louise of Savoy
3. Auguste of Baden-Baden
14. Julius Francis, Duke of Saxe-Lauenburg
7. Sibylle of Saxe-Lauenburg
15. Hedwig of the Palatinate-Sulzbach

== Sources ==
- Reynolds, Francis J., ed. (1921). "Louis Philippe" . Collier's New Encyclopedia. New York: P. F. Collier & Son Company.

Louis Philippe I, Duke of Orléans House of Orléans Born: 12 May 1725 Died: 18 November 1785
Royal titles
Preceded by Louis, Duke of Orléans	Duke of Chartres; 1725–1752	Succeeded by Louis Philippe Joseph d'Orléans
Preceded by Louis d'Orléans	Duke of Orléans; 1752–1785	Succeeded by Louis Philippe Joseph d'Orléans
Preceded by Louise Henriette de Bourbon	Duke of Étampes; 1752–1759	Succeeded by Louis Philippe Joseph d'Orléans
Royal titles
Preceded by Louis, Duke of Orléans	First Prince of the Blood; 1752–1785	Succeeded by Louis Philippe Joseph d'Orléans
