= Louise Henriette de Bourbon =

Duchess of Orléans (1726–1759)

- Duchess of Orléans; Duchess of Étampes
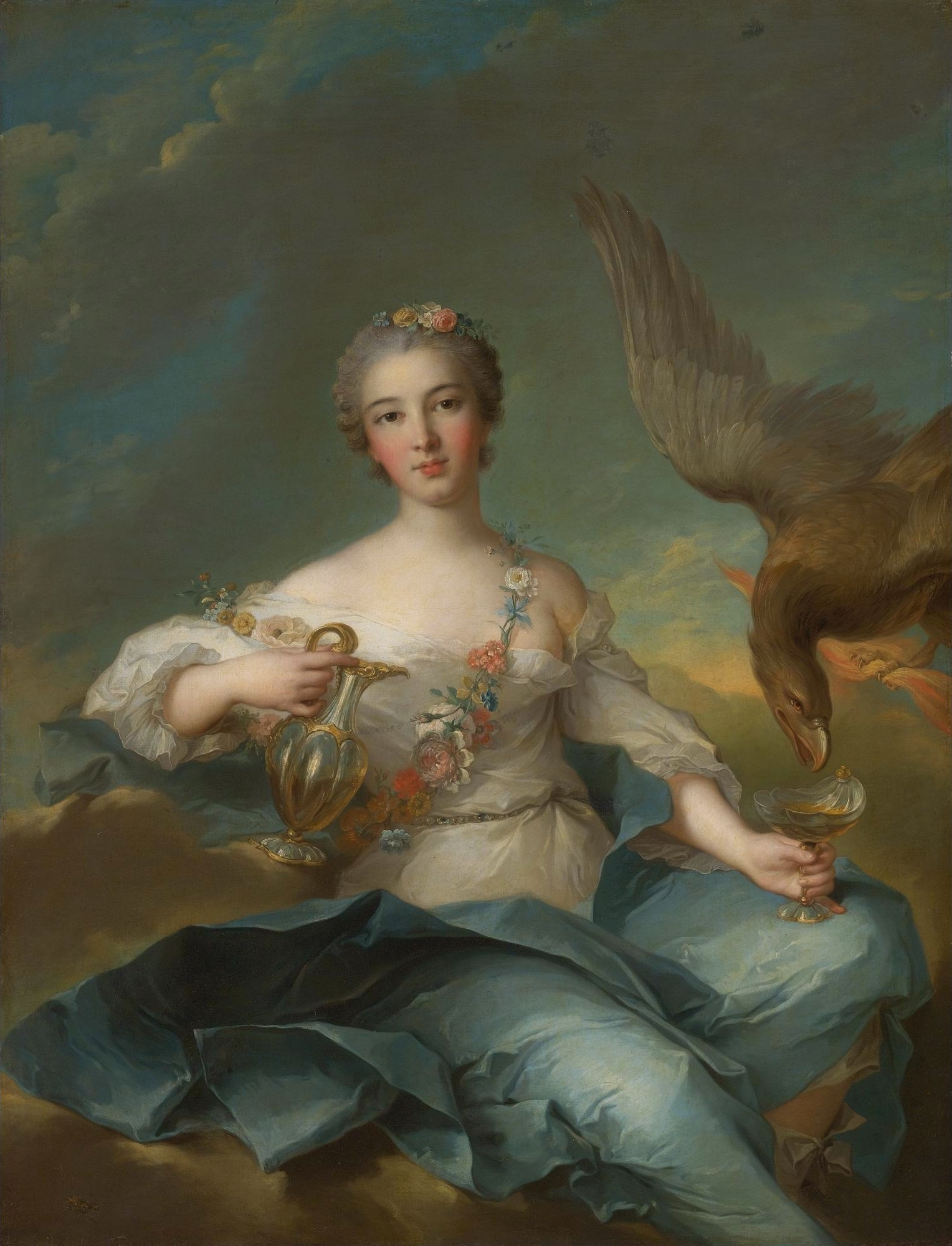
- Portrait by Jean Marc Nattier as Hebe, 1744
- Born: 20 June 1726; Paris, France
- Died: 9 February 1759 (aged 32); Palais-Royal, Paris, France
- Burial: Val-de-Grâce, Paris
- Spouse: Louis Philippe I, Duke of Orléans
- Issue Detail: Louis Philippe II, Duke of Orléans; Bathilde, Princess of Condé
Names
- Louise Henriette de Bourbon
- House: Bourbon-Conti
- Father: Louis Armand II, Prince of Conti
- Mother: Louise Élisabeth de Bourbon
- Religion: Roman Catholicism

Louise Henriette de Bourbon (20 June 1726 – 9 February 1759) was Duchess of Orleans from 1752 until her death in 1759 by marriage to Louis Philippe I, Duke of Orléans. Born a French princess du sang (princess of the blood), she was the second child and only daughter of Louis Armand II, Prince of Conti, and Louise Élisabeth de Bourbon, a granddaughter of King Louis XIV.

The Duke of Orléans and his wife were then addressed as Monsieur le Prince and Madame la Princesse. Louise Henriette was a grandmother of the French monarch Louis-Philippe, nicknamed "the Citizen King". Her descendants include the present-day pretenders to the throne of France and Italy and Kings Felipe VI of Spain and Philippe of Belgium.

== Background ==
Louise Henriette was born in Paris, the only daughter of Louis Armand de Bourbon, Prince of Conti and Louise Élisabeth de Bourbon. Her father was the second son of François Louis de Bourbon, Prince of Conti known as le Grand Conti and his wife Marie Thérèse de Bourbon. Her mother was the oldest daughter of Louis III, Prince of Condé and Louise-Françoise de Bourbon, a legitimised daughter of Louis XIV and Madame de Montespan. As a member of the reigning House of Bourbon, Louise Henriette was a Princess of the Blood (princesse du sang). In her youth she was known at court as Mademoiselle de Conti.

Louise Henriette's father died in 1727. Her oldest brother Louis François de Bourbon became the Prince of Conti.

== Marriage ==
One of Louise Henriette's cousins, Louis Jean Marie de Bourbon, Duke of Penthièvre, son of Louis-Alexandre de Bourbon, Count of Toulouse, and heir to the Penthièvre fortune, had proposed marriage to her, but her mother's choice fell upon the heir of the more prestigious House of Orléans. As a result, on 17 December 1743, at the age of seventeen, Louise Henriette married her second cousin, the Duke of Chartres, Louis Philippe d'Orléans, in the chapel of the Palace of Versailles.

Louise Henriette's mother, Louise Élisabeth de Bourbon, hoped the marriage would put an end to long-standing animosity between the House of Bourbon-Condé and the House of Orléans. The conflict began between the sisters Louise-Françoise de Bourbon, Dowager Princess of Condé (Louise Henriette's grandmother) and Françoise-Marie de Bourbon, Dowager Duchess of Orléans (Louis Philippe's grandmother), both of whom were legitimised daughters of Louis XIV and Madame de Montespan, when their father gave Françoise-Marie a dowry upon her marriage into the House of Orleans that was twice as large as the dowry he gave Louise-Françoise upon her marriage into the House of Bourbon-Condé.

In 1731, a marriage between the two families had already taken place, that of Henriette's elder brother Louis François, Prince of Conti to Louise Diane d'Orléans. The Duke of Chartres' father, Louis d'Orléans, Duke of Orléans, known as the Pious, accepted his wife's choice because of the princess' upbringing in a convent; however, after a much passionate beginning, Louise Henriette's scandalous behaviour caused the couple to break up.

Among her extramarital affairs, she is said to have had a relationship with the Count of Melfort whom she met at the Château de Saint-Cloud after the birth of her son. During the Revolution of 1789, Philippe-Égalité publicly claimed that his real father was not his mother's husband at all but instead a coachman at the Palais-Royal. This assertion was likely for political reasons to distance the ambitious Duke from the ancien régime. However DNA testing in a 2014 established the Y-chromosome haplogroup and ySTR pattern of the House of Bourbon, and has indeed confirmed the biological legitimacy of Louise Henriette's eldest son, Philippe-Égalité. As part of this project samples were taken from 3 living genealogical descendants of Louis XIII, namely Axel, Prince of Bourbon-Parma (b. 1967); Henri, Prince of Bourbon-Parma (b. 1991), and João Henrique, Prince of Orléans-Braganza (b. 1954). The former 2 are documented male line descendants of Philip V of Spain, who was a grandson of Louis XIV.

The latter is a direct male line descendant of Philip I, Duke of Orleans - a younger brother of Louis XIV and the ancestor of Louise Henriette's husband. All 3 testers were a genetic partilineal match on a ySTR comparison, and were assigned to sub-haplogroup R1b1b2a1a1b*(R-Z381), now deemed the upstream patrilineal snip of the House of Bourbon.

=== Issue ===
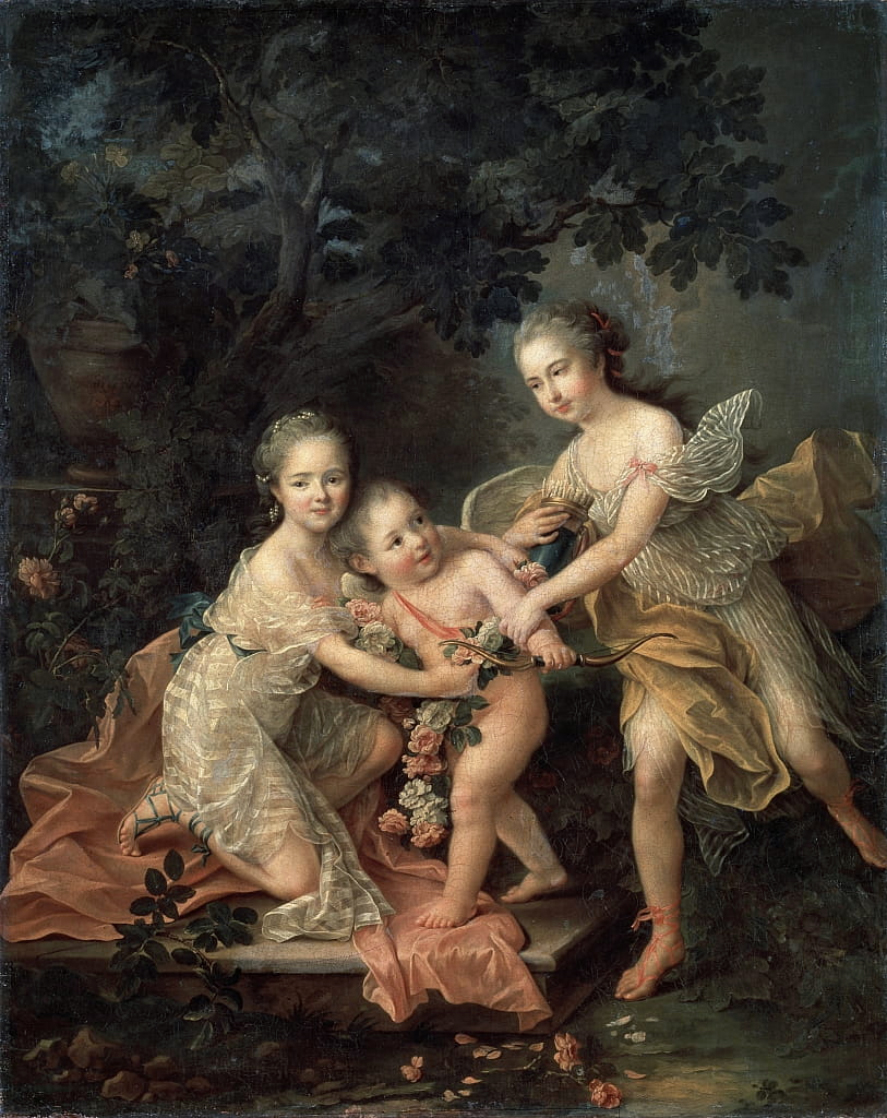
Children of the Duke of Orléans; Bathilde holding an angel, with her brother, the young Duke of Chartres, on the far right. Painted by François-Hubert Drouais (c. 1755).

Louise Henriette and Louis Philippe had:

- A daughter (Château de Saint-Cloud, 12 or 13 July 1745 – 14 December 1745, Château de Saint-Cloud);
- Louis Philippe Joseph d'Orléans (Château de Saint-Cloud, 13 April 1747, – 6 November 1793, Place de la Révolution, Paris (executed)), who succeeded his father as Duke of Orléans in 1785
- Louise Marie Thérèse Bathilde d'Orléans (Château de Saint-Cloud, 9 July 1750 – 10 January 1822, Paris), the last princesse de Condé

== Death ==
Louise Henriette died on 9 February 1759 at age 32, with her husband and children at her side, at the Palais-Royal, the Orléans residence in Paris. Her son and daughter were, respectively, eleven and eight years old. After her death, her husband had several mistresses, ultimately finding the love of his life, the witty but married Madame de Montesson, whom he married after she became a widow. Like her mother, who had inherited the title through her Condé's ancestry, Louise Henriette was the duchesse d'Étampes in her own right, having inherited the title on the occasion of her husband's rise to the head of the House of Orléans in 1752. At her death, her son inherited the ducal title, which he held until it became extinct in 1792, during the French Revolution.

In June 1759, shortly after his twelfth birthday, Louis Philippe, her only son, was presented before the court at Versailles, officially meeting King Louis XV and the royal family. Despite their detached relationship, the Duke of Orléans was greatly affected by his wife's death, and so was their son. Louise Henriette was buried at the Val-de-Grâce in Paris.

== Ancestry ==
Ancestors of Louise Henriette de Bourbon

8. Armand, Prince of Conti
4. François Louis, Prince of Conti
9. Anne Marie Martinozzi
2. Louis Armand II, Prince of Conti
10. Henri Jules, Prince of Condé
5. Marie Thérèse de Bourbon
11. Anne Henriette of Bavaria
1. Louise Henriette de Bourbon
12. Henri Jules, Prince of Condé (= 10)
6. Louis III, Prince of Condé
13. Anne Henriette of Bavaria (= 11)
3. Louise Élisabeth de Bourbon
14. Louis XIV of France
7. Louise Françoise de Bourbon
15. Madame de Montespan

== Sources ==
- de Fontenay, Pierre Nicolas (2015). Lettres à Babeth: Chroniques de l'Assemblée nationale par un Normand (1789-1791) - Kronos N° 87 (in French). SPM. ISBN 9782336374352.55
- Lever, Evelyne (2012). Le temps des illusions: Chroniques de la Cour et de la Ville, 1715-1756 (in French). Fayard. ISBN 978-2-298-06071-3.
