= Louis, Duke of Orléans (born 1703) =

Duke of Orléans, grandson of Louis XIV (1703–1752)

Louis
- First Prince of the Blood; Duke of Orléans
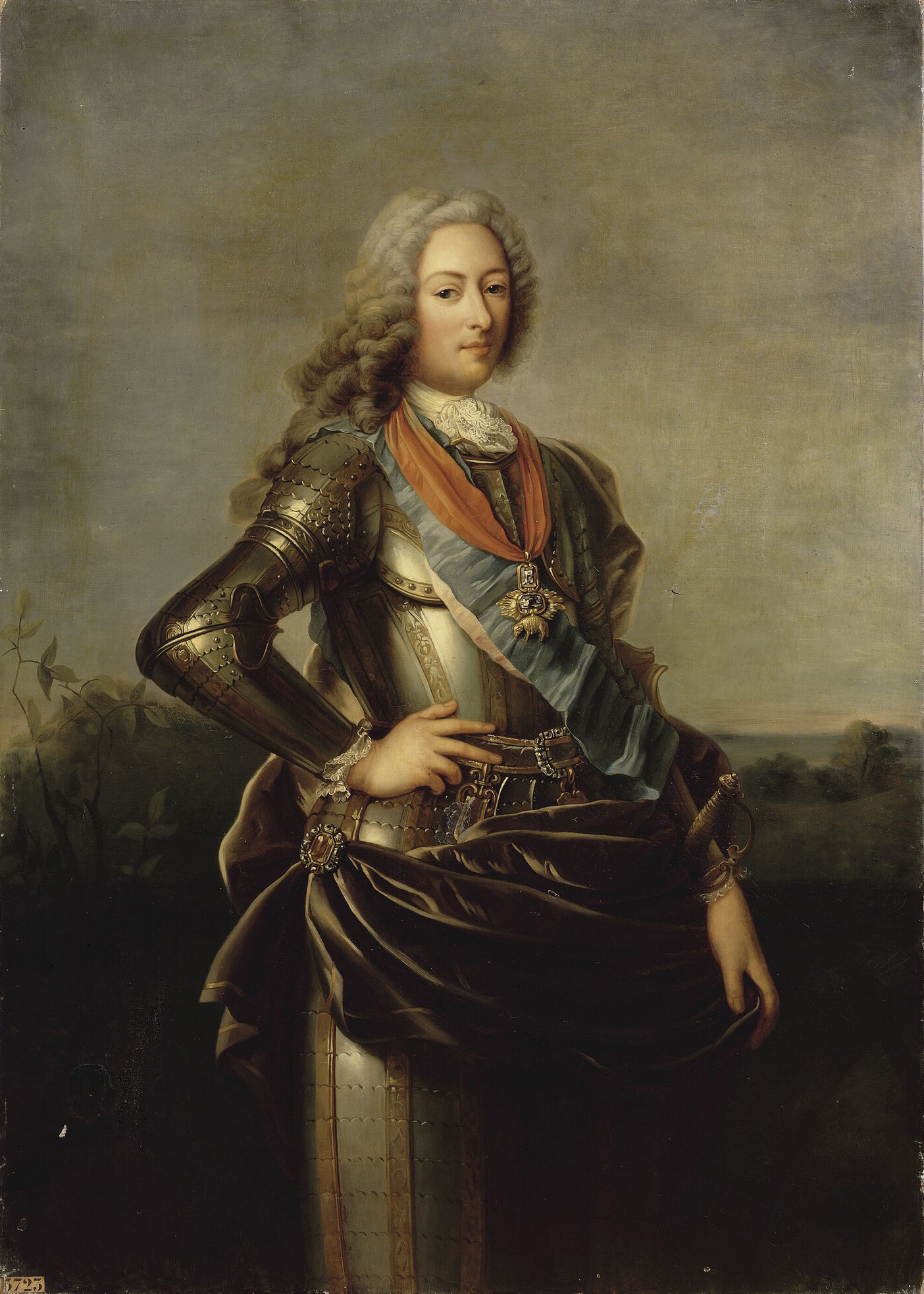
- Portrait by Charles Antoine Coypel, c. 1730
- Born: Louis d'Orléans, duc de Chartres; 4 August 1703; Palace of Versailles, France
- Died: 4 February 1752 (aged 48); Abbaye de Sainte Geneviève, Paris, France
- Burial: Val-de-Grâce, Paris, France
- Spouse: Auguste of Baden-Baden (m. 1724; died 1726)
- Issue: Louis Philippe I, Duke of Orléans; Louise Marie d'Orléans
- House: Orléans
- Father: Philippe II, Duke of Orléans
- Mother: Françoise Marie de Bourbon
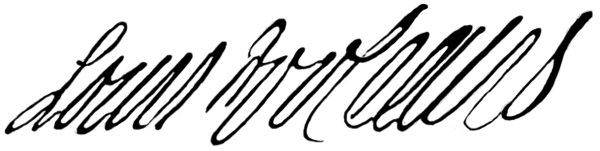
- Signature

Louis, Duke of Orléans (4 August 1703 – 4 February 1752) was a member of the House of Orléans, a cadet branch of the House of Bourbon, and as such was a prince du sang. At his father's death, he became the First Prince of the Blood (Premier Prince du Sang) and Duke of Orléans. Known as Louis le Pieux and also as Louis le Génovéfain, Louis was a pious, charitable and cultured prince, who took very little part in the politics of the time.

== Early years ==
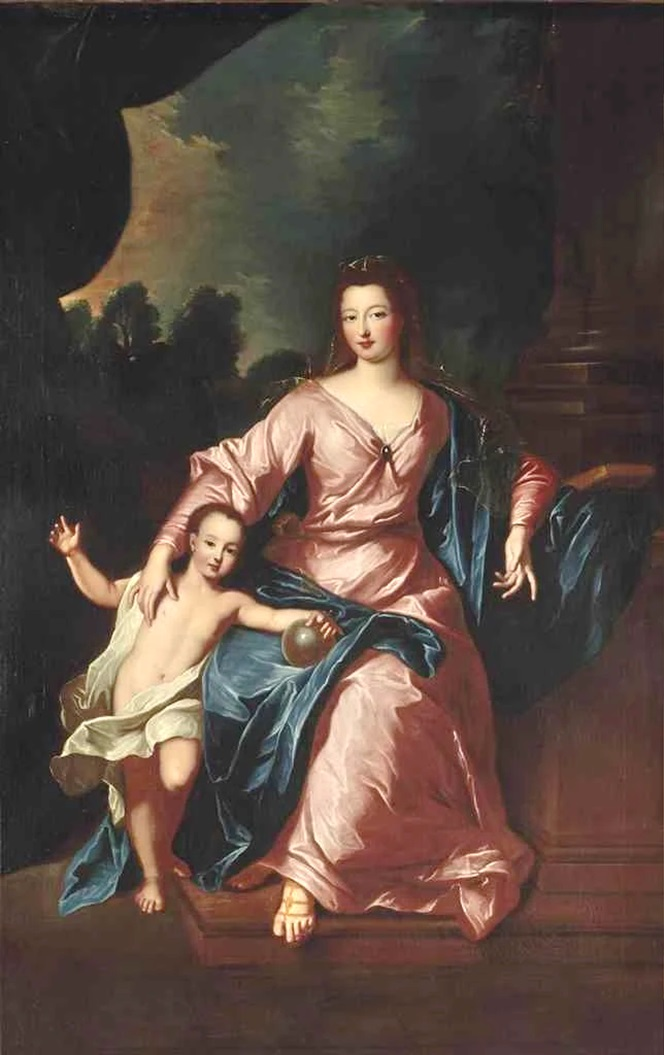
Prince Louis with his mother, by Pierre Gobert

Louis d'Orléans was born at the Palace of Versailles in 1703 to Philippe II, Duke of Orléans and his wife, Françoise Marie de Bourbon, the youngest legitimised daughter of Louis XIV and of his mistress Madame de Montespan. He was the only son of eight children, and at his birth, he was given the courtesy title of Duke of Chartres as the heir to the Orléans fortune and titles. His maternal grandfather, Louis XIV, in addition gave him the allowance reserved for the First Prince of the Blood, a rank he was not yet eligible to hold.

He was brought up by his mother and his grandmother, Elizabeth Charlotte of the Palatinate, and tutored by Nicolas-Hubert Mongault, the illegitimate son of Jean-Baptiste Colbert de Saint-Pouange, a cousin of Jean-Baptiste Colbert, Louis XIV's minister. He was very close to his mother, the two remaining close until her death in 1749.

Louis was very close to his younger sister Louise Élisabeth d'Orléans, who was to become queen consort of Spain for seven months in 1724. He was not, however, close to his elder sister, Charlotte Aglaé d'Orléans, the wife of Francesco d'Este, Duke of Modena. They were in frequent conflict during her many return visits to the French court from Modena.

=== Regency ===
Upon the death of his maternal grandfather Louis XIV in 1715, his father, the former king's nephew, was selected to be the regent of the country for the five-year-old new king, Louis XV. The court was moved to Paris so his father could govern the country with the young king close by his side. Louis XV was installed in the Palais des Tuileries, opposite of the Palais-Royal, the Paris home of the Orléans family. During the regency, Orléans was seen as the "third personage of the kingdom" immediately after Louis XV and his own father, the regent. He was formally admitted to the Conseil de Régence on 30 January 1718. Despite his father's wishes, though, the Orléans household was never to play an overly public or political role in France. The following year, he was made the governor of the Dauphiné. He was not forced to move there in order to fulfill his new duties. Later, he resigned.

In 1720, he became Grand Master of the Order of Saint-Lazare and Jerusalem. In 1721, under his father's influence, he was named Colonel général de l'Infanterie, and post he held until 1730.

== Duke of Orléans ==
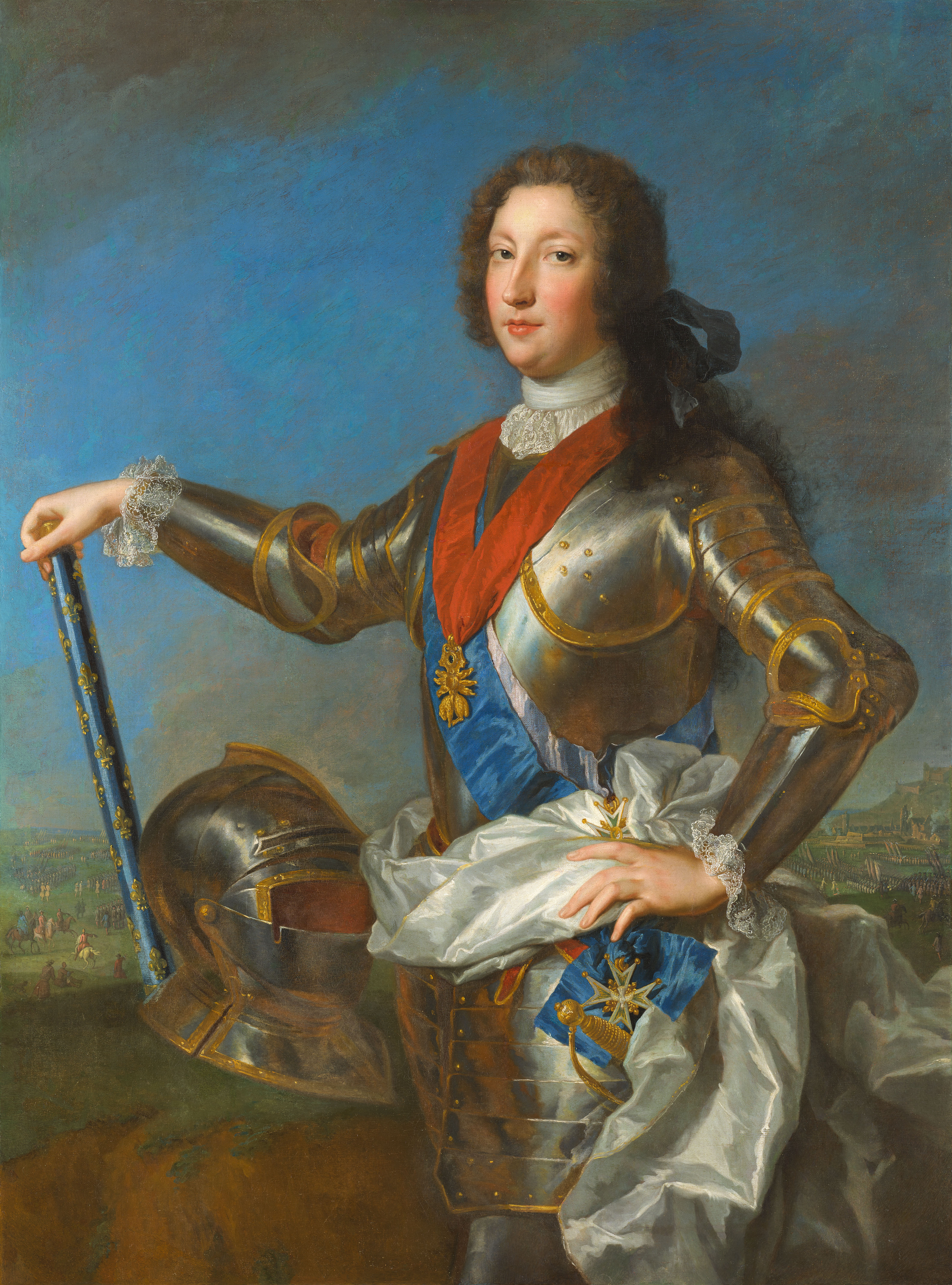
Louis as Duke of Orléans, by Alexis Simon Belle

Upon the death of his father on 2 December 1723, the twenty-year-old Louis assumed the hereditary title of Duke of Orléans and became the head of the House of Orléans. He also became heir presumptive to the throne of France until the birth of Louis XV's first-born son in 1729. This was because King Philip V of Spain, the second son of the Grand Dauphin and uncle of the young king, had renounced his rights to the French throne for himself and his descendants in the Peace of Utrecht in 1713. Although the regent had hoped that his son would assume a prominent role in the government as he had, the post of prime minister went to Louis' elder cousin, Louis Henri, Duke of Bourbon, when the regent died. Constantly trying to consolidate and maintain his power at court, the Duke of Bourbon was always suspicious of Louis' motivations and was frequently opposed to him.

In 1723, the Orléans household was conspicuous for his hostility to the former prime minister, Cardinal Dubois. The Orléans also worked with Claude le Blanc and Nicolas Prosper Bauyn d'Angervilliers in the post of Secretary of State for War; Louis himself worked in this position from 1723 to 1730.

== Marriage ==
The fifth child and only son out of eight children, he was still not married at the death of his father. In 1721, the ambassador of France to Russia suggested a marriage between him and one of the two unmarried daughters of Peter I of Russia: the Grand Duchess Anna Petrovna (known for her fluency in French) or her younger sister, Grand Duchess Yelizaveta Petrovna. But the idea of a marriage with a Russian Grand Duchess had to be abandoned as there soon arose difficulties relative to religion and order of precedence. Louis was a great-grandson of the king of France and as such was entitled to the style of Serene Highness. A Russian Grand Duchess, however, as a daughter of the tsar, was entitled to the style of Imperial Highness. Anna Petrovna later married the Duke of Schleswig-Holstein-Gottorp.

Another possible bride that was considered for him was his first cousin Élisabeth Alexandrine de Bourbon. She was the youngest daughter of his mother's elder sister, Louise Françoise de Bourbon. Élisabeth Alexandrine was also the younger sister of his main rival, the Duke of Bourbon.

In 1723, a German princess was suggested. She was Auguste of Baden-Baden, the daughter of Louis William, Margrave of Baden-Baden and his wife Sibylle Auguste of Saxe-Lauenburg. The marriage was agreed upon by his mother, and the bride's small dowry set at 80,000 livres. The marriage by proxy took place on 18 June 1724 at Rastatt, in Baden-Württemberg, Germany, then on 13 July in the town of Sarry (Marne), in France. It was at Sarry that the couple first met. They fell in love at first sight. At the French court, the new Duchess of Orléans was known as Auguste de Bade.

The ducal couple had two children, but only one survived infancy.

== Later life ==
On 5 September 1725, the court celebrated the marriage of Louis XV to the Polish princess Marie Leszczyńska at Fontainebleau. Earlier, the Orléans had represented Louis XV at the proxy marriage ceremony, which had taken place the previous 15 August at Strasbourg. The young queen would later have a lot of sympathy for the quiet and pious Duke.

The following year, on 8 August 1726, the duke's young wife died three days after the birth of her second child, Louise Marie, at the Palais-Royal in Paris. After the early death of his wife, and until his own death in 1752, Louis lived by strict rules.

His aunt, Élisabeth Charlotte d'Orléans, Duchess of Lorraine, proposed her two daughters Élisabeth Thérèse de Lorraine and Anne Charlotte de Lorraine as possible wives; Louis refused outright.

In 1730, Cardinal Fleury secured the duke's dismissal from the position of colonel-general of the infantry, a post he had held for nine years. Afterwards, he became increasingly religious. Around 1740, he ordered the employment of a priest at the Palais Royal to stay with him during ill health. He later decided to retire at the Abbaye Sainte-Geneviève de Paris. From then on, he became known as Louis le Génovéfain. As he retired into private life, Louis spent his time translating the Psalms and the Pauline epistles, protecting men of science and managing his wealth. Like his cousin, the Duke of Penthièvre, he was praised for his charitable works. After the birth of his son, Orléans was often preoccupied with the education of his son.

His son, Louis Philippe, would have liked to have married Madame Henriette, the second daughter of Louis XV, but Louis XV refused. The king did not want the House of Orléans to be as powerful as it had been during the regency of his Orléans' father. In 1737 he, along with his aunt, the Dowager Duchess of Bourbon, were asked to be godparents of the king's son, Louis de France, Dauphin of France.

On 17 December 1743, his son married Louise Henriette de Bourbon, the daughter of Louis Armand II, Prince of Conti and his wife, Louise Élisabeth de Bourbon. The Condé and Orléans families had been at odds since the Orléans had assumed the rank of First Prince of the Blood in 1709, and it was hoped that the marriage would settle their mésentente. Although passionate at first, the marriage soon proved unhappy because of the young bride's débaucherie.

Louis d'Orléans would see the birth of his grandchildren Louis Philippe and Bathilde, who, during the French Revolution of 1789, would be known respectively as Philippe Égalité and Citoyenne Vérité. Because of the scandalous behaviour of their mother, he refused to acknowledge the legitimacy of his grandchildren.

In 1749, his mother died; he soon died in 1752, at the age of forty-eight, at the Abbaye de Sainte Geneviève, having lost most of his sanity. On his deathbed, on suspicion of Jansenist views, he was refused communion by the Abbé Bouettin of the Saint-Étienne-du-Mont church, but was given the last rites by his own chaplain. He reluctantly received his grandchildren before his death at the behest of his confessor. In his will, he instructed that his body be given to anatomists for dissection.

Louis d'Orléans had outlived all his siblings apart from Charlotte Aglaé, the Duchess of Modena and Reggio. He was buried at the Val-de-Grâce in Paris. His funeral was widely attended by the common people of Paris due to his charitable reputation.

== Legacy ==
Louis was praised as a very charitable man; in Versailles, the now destroyed College d'Orléans, was named after him due to his generous patronage of the college's construction. He also remodelled the gardens at the Palais-Royal as well as the Orléans country residence, the Château de Saint-Cloud (c. 1735). Louis was also praised for giving generous financial aid to victims of floods in the Loire in 1731, and again in 1740.

== Issue ==
Name	Portrait	Lifespan	Notes
Louis Philippe d'Orléans; Duke of Orléans		12 May 1725 – 18 November 1785	Born at Versailles, he was titled Duke of Chartres (duc de Chartres) at birth; became Duke of Orléans (duc d'Orléans) upon his father's death in 1752; married Louise Henriette de Bourbon in 1743 and had issue.
Louise Marie d'Orléans; Mademoiselle		5 August 1726 – 14 May 1728	Born at the Palais Royal, she was known as Mademoiselle until her early death at Saint Cloud

== Ancestors ==
Ancestors of Louis, Duke of Orléans (born 1703)

8. Louis XIII of France
4. Philippe I, Duke of Orléans
9. Anne of Austria
2. Philippe II, Duke of Orléans
10. Charles I Louis, Elector Palatine
5. Elizabeth Charlotte of the Palatinate
11. Charlotte of Hesse-Kassel
1. Louis, Duke of Orléans
12. Louis XIII of France (= 8)
6. Louis XIV of France
13. Anne of Austria (= 9)
3. Françoise Marie de Bourbon
14. Gabriel de Rochechouart, Duke of Mortemart
7. Madame de Montespan
15. Diane de Grandseigne

Louis, Duke of Orléans (born 1703) House of Orléans Born: 4 August 1703 Died: 4 February 1752
French nobility
Preceded by Prince Philippe Charles of Orléans	Duke of Chartres; 1703–1723	Succeeded by Louis Philippe of Orléans
Preceded by Prince Philippe Charles of Orléans	Duke of Orléans; 1723–1752	Succeeded by Louis Philippe of Orléans
Royal titles
Preceded by Prince Philippe Charles of Orléans (did not use it)	First Prince of the Blood; 1723–1752	Succeeded by Louis Philippe of Orléans
