= Étiennette Le Marquis =

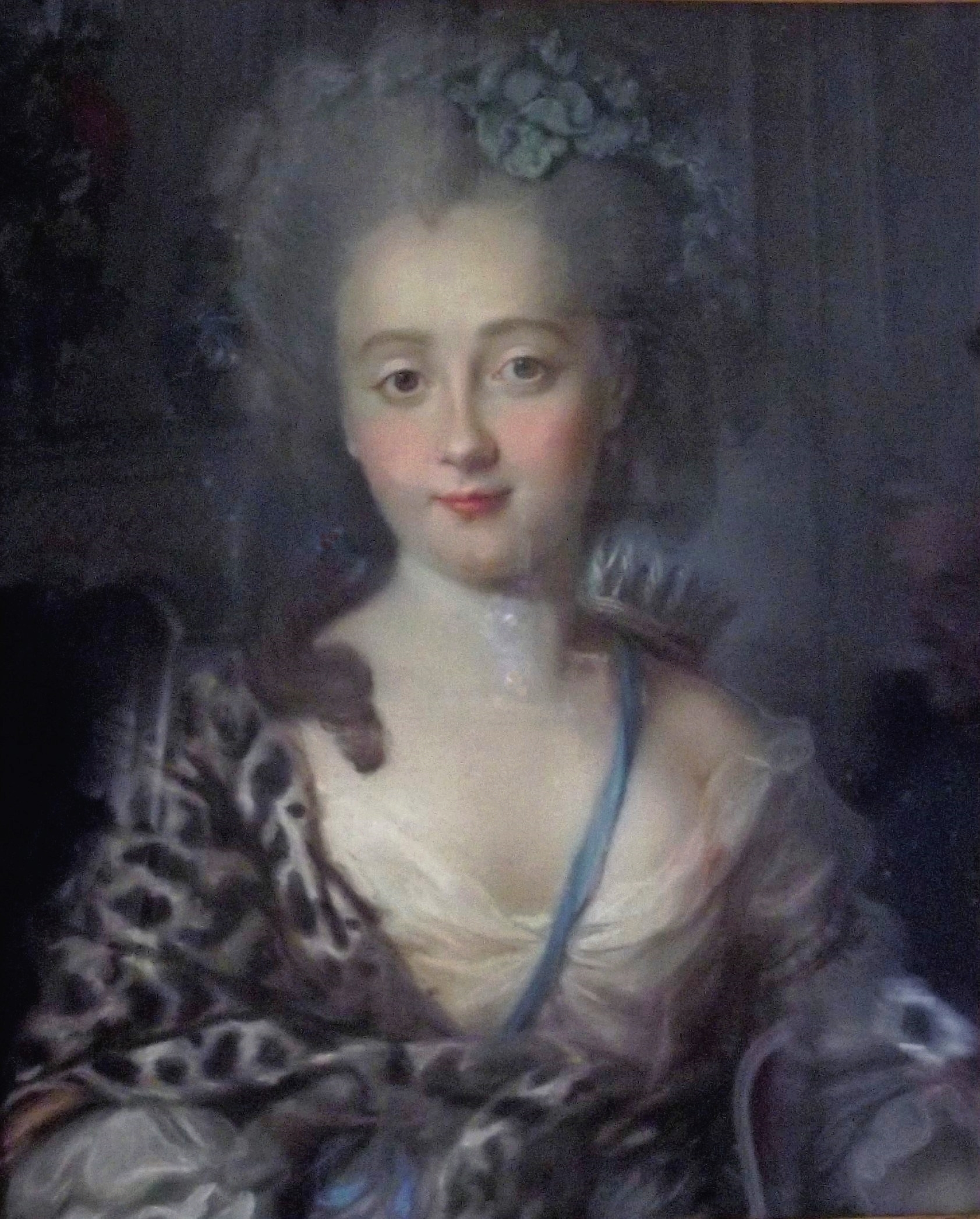
- Born: Étiennette Le Marquis; 1737; Dinan, France
- Died: 9 February 1806; Paris, France
- Burial place: Cimetière du Père-Lachaise
- Occupation: Royal Mistress
- Years active: 1759-1773
- Partner: Louis Philippe I

Étiennette Marie Périne de Villemomble, née Étiennette Le Marquis (1737–1806), was a French dancer and courtesan, the official royal mistress of Louis Philippe I, Duke of Orléans between 1759 and 1773. She was made dame de Villemomble in 1767.
