= Madame de Montesson =

Mistress to Louis Philippe I, Duke of Orleans (1738-1806)

Charlotte-Jeanne Béraud
- Marquis of Montesson
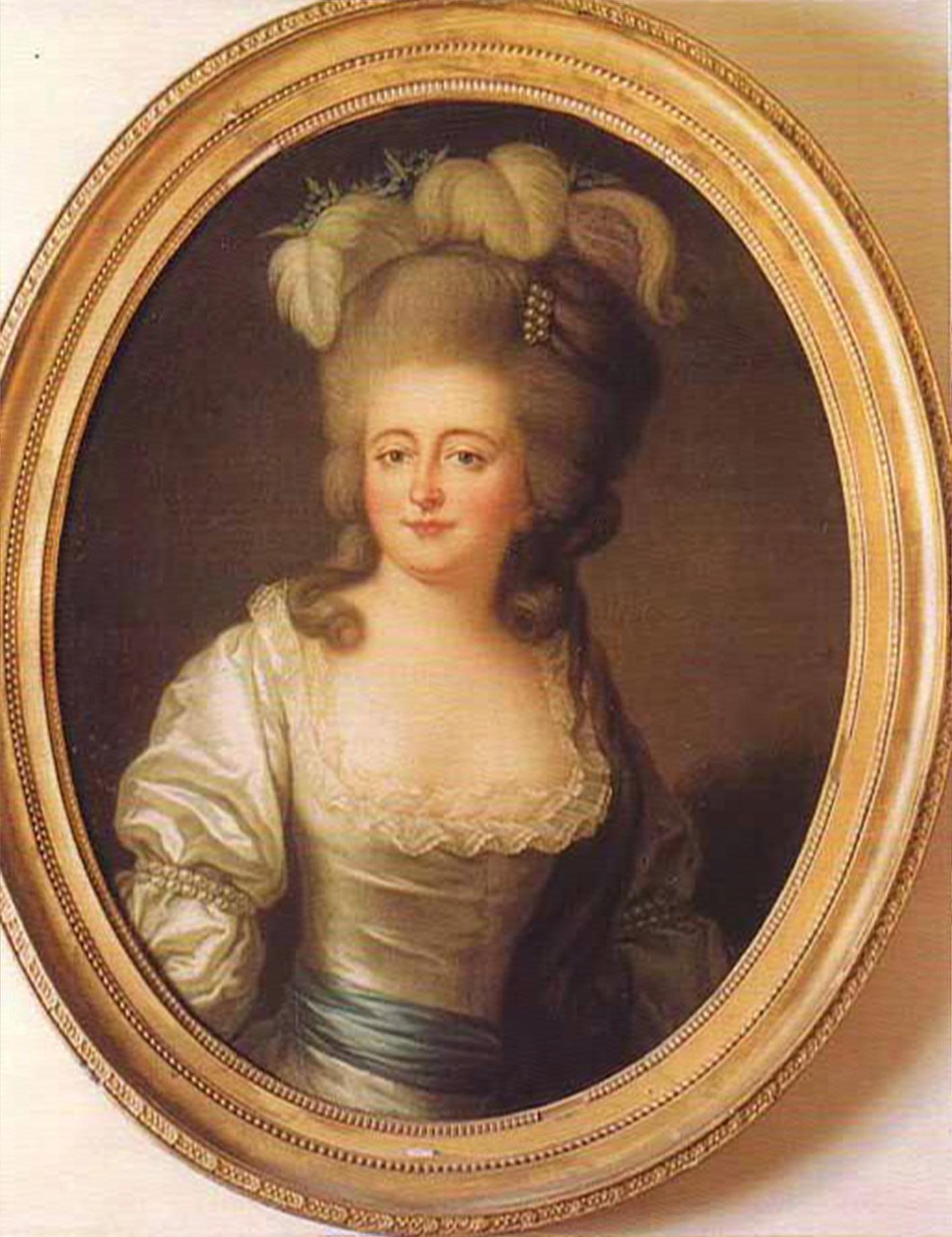
- Portrait by Élisabeth Vigée Le Brun, 1779
- Born: 4 October 1738; Paris, France
- Died: 6 February 1806 (aged 67)
- Spouse: Jean-Baptiste de Montesson (m. 1757; died 1769) Louis Philippe I, Duke of Orléans (m. 1773; died 1785)
- House: Orléans (by marriage)
- Father: Louis Berault de La Haye de Riou

Charlotte-Jeanne Béraud de La Haye de Riou (4 October 1738 – 6 February 1806) was a mistress to Louis Philippe d'Orléans, Duke of Orléans, and ultimately, his wife; however, Louis XV would not allow her to become the Duchess. She wrote and acted in several plays. She is known simply as Madame de Montesson.

== Life ==
Charlotte-Jeanne Béraud de La Haye de Riou was born in Paris of an old Breton family.

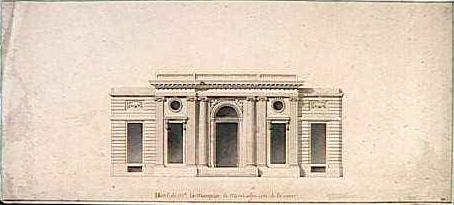
Hôtel de Montesson at 40, rue de la Chaussée-d'Antin was destroyed after a fire in 1810

On 11 October 1757, she married the seventy-year-old widower Jean Baptiste, Marquis of Montesson, who died in 1769. Her beauty and intelligence attracted the attention of the widowed Louis Philippe d'Orléans, the fat (his wife Louise Henriette de Bourbon had died in 1759), whom she secretly married in 1773 with the authorisation of Louis XV. After her marriage to the Duke of Orléans, a member of the royal family and a Prince du Sang, her low rank did not allow her the title of Duchess of Orléans.

For her husband's amusement and her own, she set up a little theater and wrote several plays, in the acting of which she herself took part.

She was arrested on 20 April 1793 (1 floréal an II of the Republican calendar) during the Terror, and first imprisoned in the La Force prison in Paris. She was released on 28 September 1794 (after the fall of Maximilien Robespierre), befriended Joséphine de Beauharnais, and was a prominent figure at the beginning of the empire.

=== Works ===
The best edition of her works appeared under the title of Œuvres anonymes in 1782–1785. See Charles Collé, Journal (1868); the Memoirs of St Simon, Madame de Genlis, the duchesse d'Abrantes and Mme de Levis; G Strenger, "La Société de la marquise de Montesson," in the Nouvelle revue (1902); J Turquan, Madame de Montesson douairière d'Orléans (Paris, 1904); and G. Capon and R Yves-Plessis, Les Théâtres clandestins du xviii' siècle (1904).
