= Louise Marie d'Orléans =

Louise Marie
- Mademoiselle
- Born: 5 August 1726; Palais Royal, Paris, France
- Died: 14 May 1728 (aged 1); Château de Saint-Cloud, France
- Burial: Val-de-Grâce, Paris
Names
- Louise Marie d'Orléans
- Father: Louis d'Orléans, Duke of Orléans
- Mother: Auguste of Baden-Baden

Louise Marie d'Orléans (Note: Some documents call her Louise Madeleine d'Orléans.) (5 August 1726 – 14 May 1728) was a French princess of the blood by birth. She died in infancy.

== Biography ==
Louise Marie d'Orléans was born at the Palais-Royal to Louis d'Orléans, Duke of Orléans and his Duchess, the Margravine Johanna of Baden-Baden, who died three days after giving birth.

Her father was a second cousin of the then King Louis XV, and a great-grandson of Louis XIII. Her mother was the last child of the famous general Louis William, Margrave of Baden-Baden. Louise Marie was initially known at court as Mademoiselle d'Orléans and, after the death of her father's first cousin Louise Anne de Bourbon, as Mademoiselle.

She died at the age of 1 year and 8 months at the Château de Saint-Cloud near Paris, and was buried in the Val-de-Grâce Convent in Paris.

== Ancestors ==
Ancestors of Louise Marie d'Orléans

8. Philippe I, Duke of Orléans
4. Philippe II, Duke of Orléans
9. Elizabeth Charlotte of the Palatinate
2. Louis, Duke of Orléans
10. Louis XIV of France
5. Françoise Marie de Bourbon
11. Madame de Montespan
1. Louise Marie d'Orléans
12. Ferdinand Maximilian of Baden-Baden
6. Louis William, Margrave of Baden-Baden
13. Louise of Savoy
3. Auguste of Baden-Baden
14. Julius Francis, Duke of Saxe-Lauenburg
7. Sibylle of Saxe-Lauenburg
15. Hedwig of Sulzbach
