= Pierre Pontard =

Constitutional bishop and deputy

Pierre Pontard (23 September 1749 – 22 January 1832) was a constitutional bishop and a deputy during the French Revolution.

== Political career during the Revolution ==
Pontard was born in Mussidan in Dordogne, France. He followed a career in the Roman Catholic priesthood and became a curé in Sarlat. Having espoused the reforming ideas of the Revolution, he was a fervent advocate of the Civil Constitution of the Clergy. In February 1791 he was elected constitutional bishop of the Dordogne, and on 8 September of that year was elected to the National Constituent Assembly as a representative of the clergy of Dordogne.

A critic of clerical celibacy, he married, and presented his wife to the Convention Nationale on 22 September 1793. He supported several measures in favour of the marriage of priests issued by the Civil Constitution of the Clergy.

Pontard was responsible for bringing to Paris the prophetess Suzette Labrousse, like him a native of the Dordogne, and remained closely associated with her subsequent career. He was also closely connected to the esoteric circles of the time, particularly to the Duchess of Bourbon, Bathilde d'Orléans, to Catherine Théot, and also Dom Gerle (presented as rivals by some contemporaries). He was also linked to the scandals associated with these circles.

He actively encouraged Suzette Labrousse while she was being sheltered and having her works published by the Duchess of Orléans (Journal prophétique, 1792; Recueil des ouvrages de la célèbre Mlle Labrousse, 1797), and supported Labrousses's journey to Rome. He brought ridicule upon himself by presenting her to several prominent religious figures. When she died he was the executor of her will, in which she left him a (contested) legacy of 3,000 francs. In Suzette Labrousse's analysis of the Apocalypse he saw the proofs that the French Revolution was initiating a "universal regeneration"..

== After the Directoire ==
Under the Consulate, Pontard ran a boarding school in Paris, but had to abandon it for financial reasons. He fell into poverty and was supported from 1820 by Bathilde d'Orléans, who gave him a life annuity. He lived for the rest of his life in the Hôpital Sainte-Périne, where he died.

In 1812 he published the Grammaire mécanique élémentaire de l'orthographe française.

== Sources ==
1. De Boysson, Richard: Le Clerge Perigourdin Pendant La Persecution Revolutionnaire *Google Books
2. Crédot, P.-J., Delhomme and Briguet, 1893: Pierre Pontard, Évêque Constitutionnel De La Dordogne
3. Assemblée nationale website: biography (in French)
4. Extract from the dictionary of députés Poisson Populle (in French)
5. (in French)
