= Bathilde d'Orléans =

- Princess of Condé
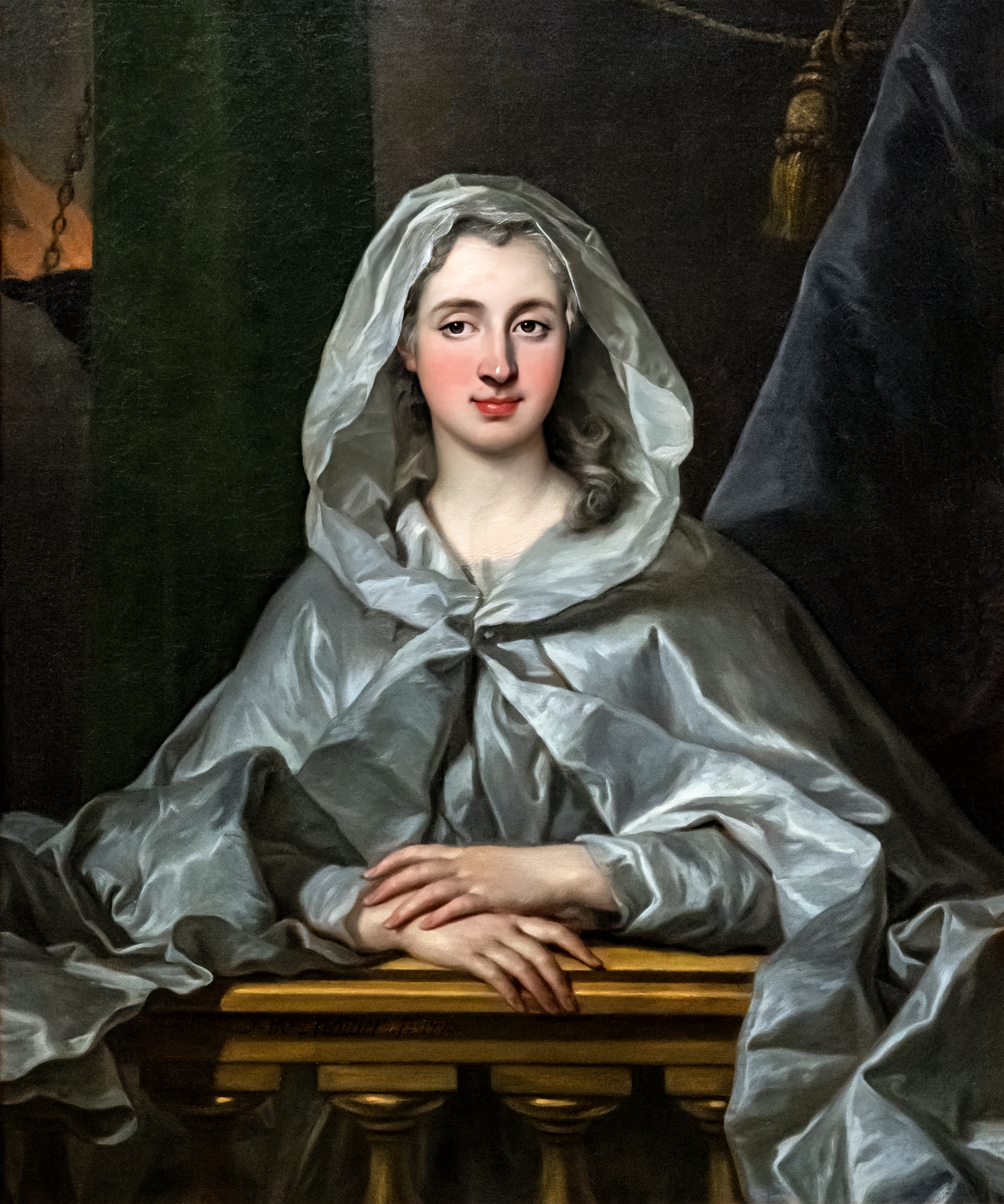
- Portrait by Louis-Michel van Loo, c. 1770
- Born: 9 July 1750; Château de Saint-Cloud, France
- Died: 10 January 1822 (aged 71); Paris, France
- Burial: Chapelle royale de Dreux
- Spouse: Louis Henri, Prince of Condé (m. 1770; sep. 1780)
- Issue: Louis Antoine, Duke of Enghien; Adélaïde-Victoire Dumassy (illeg.)
Names
- Louise Marie Thérèse Bathilde d'Orléans
- House: Orléans
- Father: Louis Philippe I, Duke of Orléans
- Mother: Louise Henriette de Bourbon
- Religion: Roman Catholicism

Bathilde d'Orléans (Louise Marie Thérèse Bathilde; 9 July 1750 – 10 January 1822) was a French princess of the blood of the House of Orléans. She was sister of Philippe Égalité, the mother of the Duke of Enghien and aunt of Louis Philippe I, King of the French. Married to the young Duke of Enghien, a distant cousin, she was known as the Duchess of Bourbon following the birth of her son. She was known as Citoyenne Vérité during the French Revolution.

== Youth ==
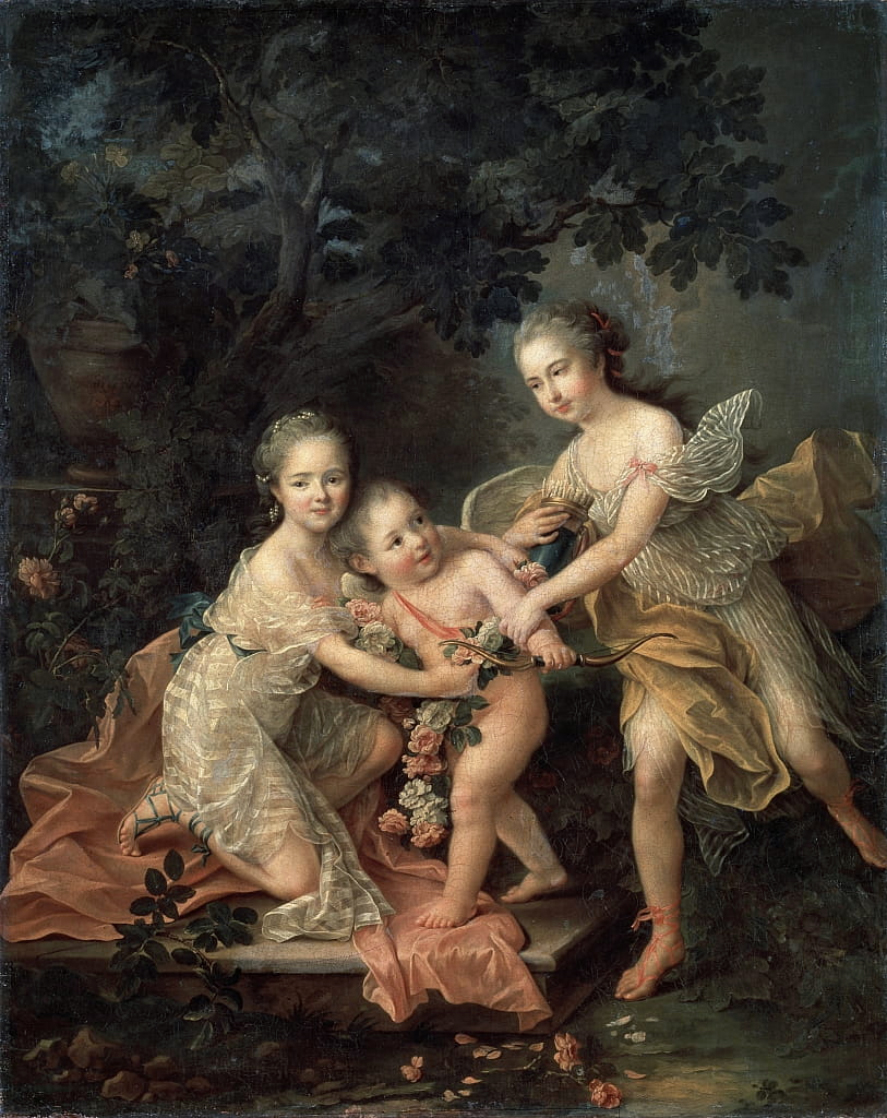
Children of the Duke of Orléans (c.1755); Bathilde holding an angel, with her brother, the young Duke of Chartres, on the far right. Painted by François-Hubert Drouais.

Descended from both Louis XIV of France and his younger brother, Philippe of France, Duke of Orléans, Bathilde was born a princesse du sang and as such was addressed with the style of Serene Highness. The daughter of Louis Philippe d'Orléans, Duke of Chartres and his wife, Louise Henriette de Bourbon, Bathilde was born at the Château de Saint-Cloud, some ten kilometres west of Paris, on 9 July 1750.

On 12 March 1756, Bathilde and her brother were amongst the first people in France to be inoculated against smallpox, a decision made by their father against the advice of both their mother and King Louis XV. The procedure was performed by physician Théodore Tronchin, and a few days later, "the Duchess of Orleans, having appeared at the Opera with her two children, was greeted by endless applause and cheers, as if the two princes had miraculously escaped death."

Her mother died in 1759 when Bathilde was just eight years old. Her father, pressured by his mistress, Madame de Montesson, sent her to be educated as a boarder at the Panthemont Convent in Paris.

== Marriage ==
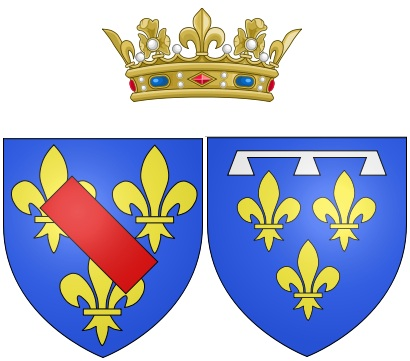
Arms of Bathilde as Duchess of Bourbon, Princess of Condé

Initially, Bathilde was considered as a possible bride for a distant cousin, Ferdinand, Duke of Parma, the favourite grandson of King Louis XV of France and Queen Marie Leczinska. However, that marriage never materialised. She first met her future husband, the Duke of Enghien, the son and heir of the Prince of Condé and Charlotte de Rohan, at the Palace of Versailles when attending the wedding of her brother in July 1769. The young duke also held the rank of prince of the blood; however, he was descended from a younger branch of the House of Bourbon. His sister Louise Adélaïde attended the same convent as Bathilde, which gave the Duke a pretext to visit the convent and see Bathilde. Still just thirteen years old, the Duke asked for her hand and their parents agreed to the marriage. Bathilde's reservations about marrying someone so young were overcome by her desire to leave the convent, return to the bosom of her family and marry into such a prestigious family.

The couple married on 20 April 1770 at the Palace of Versailles in front of the court. Bathilde was nineteen and her husband was fourteen. Due to the age of the groom the marriage was not consummated and Bathilde returned to her convent. Before long, her husband had carried her off from the convent. After only six months he began to tire of marriage and turned his attention to other women. The periodic reconciliations between Bathilde and her husband eventually allowed her to give birth to their only son, Louis Antoine Henri de Bourbon, in August 1772. From marriage until the birth of her son, she was known as the Duchess of Enghien; after the birth she was known as the Duchess of Bourbon.

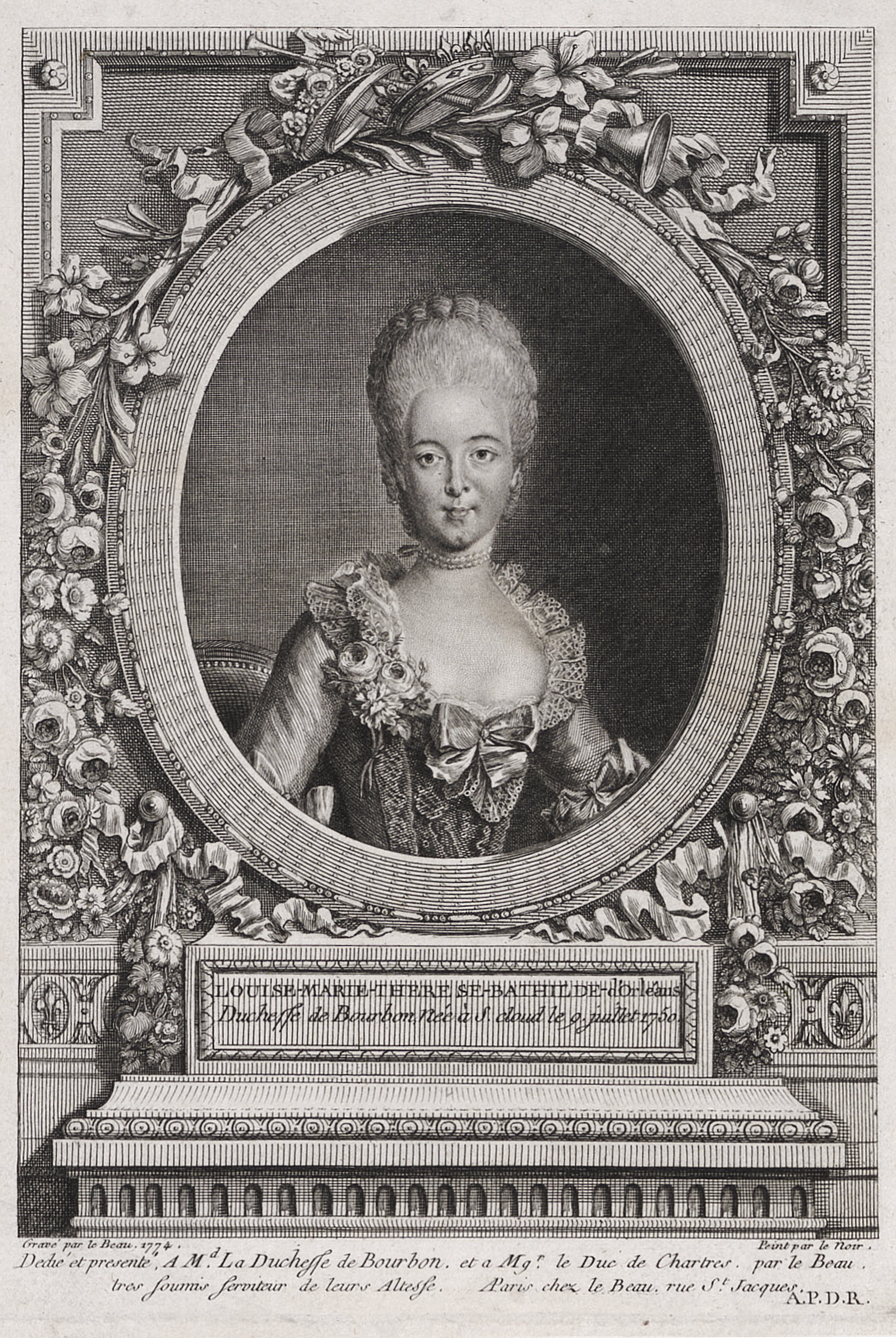
Bathilde, Duchess of Bourbon, engraving by Pierre Adrien Le Beau, 1774.

Both husband and wife had lovers, and in 1778 Bathilde gave birth to an illegitimate daughter, Adelaïde-Victoire, who was registered under the surname Dumassy (and not Damassy as was often mentioned in genealogical works). Her father was a young naval officer, Alexandre Amable de Roquefeuil. The relationship ended in tragedy in 1786 when Roquefeuil was drowned in Dunkirk harbour. The scandal of the duke's adultery came out in 1778, and the consequences fell entirely on Bathilde's shoulders; she was believed to have commissioned a play from Pierre Laujon which featured a thinly disguised Duke of Bourbon and his mistress. That same year, in March, the Duchess had an encounter with the Count of Artois (the future King Charles X), younger brother of King Louis XVI, who was escorting a "lady of the town" while attending a masked ball. "After exchanging a few words, the irritated Duchess reached up and snatched off his mask whereupon he pulled her nose so hard and painfully that she wept." Her husband subsequently challenged Charles to a duel, during which he wounded him in the hand, though the two men were reconciled the next year. This affair became known as: An Incident at the Opera Ball on Mardi Gras in 1778. The couple formally separated in 1780.

As a separated spouse, the duchess was never received at court, although she visited Marie Antoinette in the Petit Trianon at Versailles. She lived for a time with her father and his second wife, Madame de Montesson, at their château de Saint-Assise at Seine-Port. When her father died, in 1785, her brother Philippe became the Duke of Orléans. It was around this time that Bathilde bought a house in Paris called the Hôtel de Clermont and the château de Petit-Bourg. She was able to see her son once a week, and kept her daughter with her.

In 1787, she purchased the Élysée Palace from Louis XVI and had a hamlet constructed there; inspired by the Hameau de Chantilly at the Château de Chantilly. Her salon was renowned throughout Europe for its liberty of thought and the brilliant wits who frequented it.

She became interested in the occult, studying the supernatural arts of chiromancy, astrology, dream interpretation, and in particular animal magnetism, which she studied directly under Franz Mesmer. Bathilde's houses, the Élysée Palace and the Château de Petit-Bourg, became the most important meeting centres for mysticism in revolutionary France, and were frequented by important occult figures including: the Marquis de Puységur, a founder of hypnotism; Christian mystics Dom Gerle, Louis Claude de Saint-Martin, and Pierre Pontard, who conceptualized the French Revolution as divinely ordained; and the prophets Suzette Labrouse, who foretold the calling of the Estates General and the revolution ten years before they occurred, and Catherine Théot, who believed she was destined to be the mother of the new, revolutionary, Messiah. Labrouse and Théot's predictions were published in the Journal prophétique, which was funded and edited by Bathilde. Since 1775, she had been the Grand Mistress of the French Masonic Lodge of Adoption, in parallel to her brother Philippe being the Grand Master of the male Freemasons in France.

== French Revolution ==
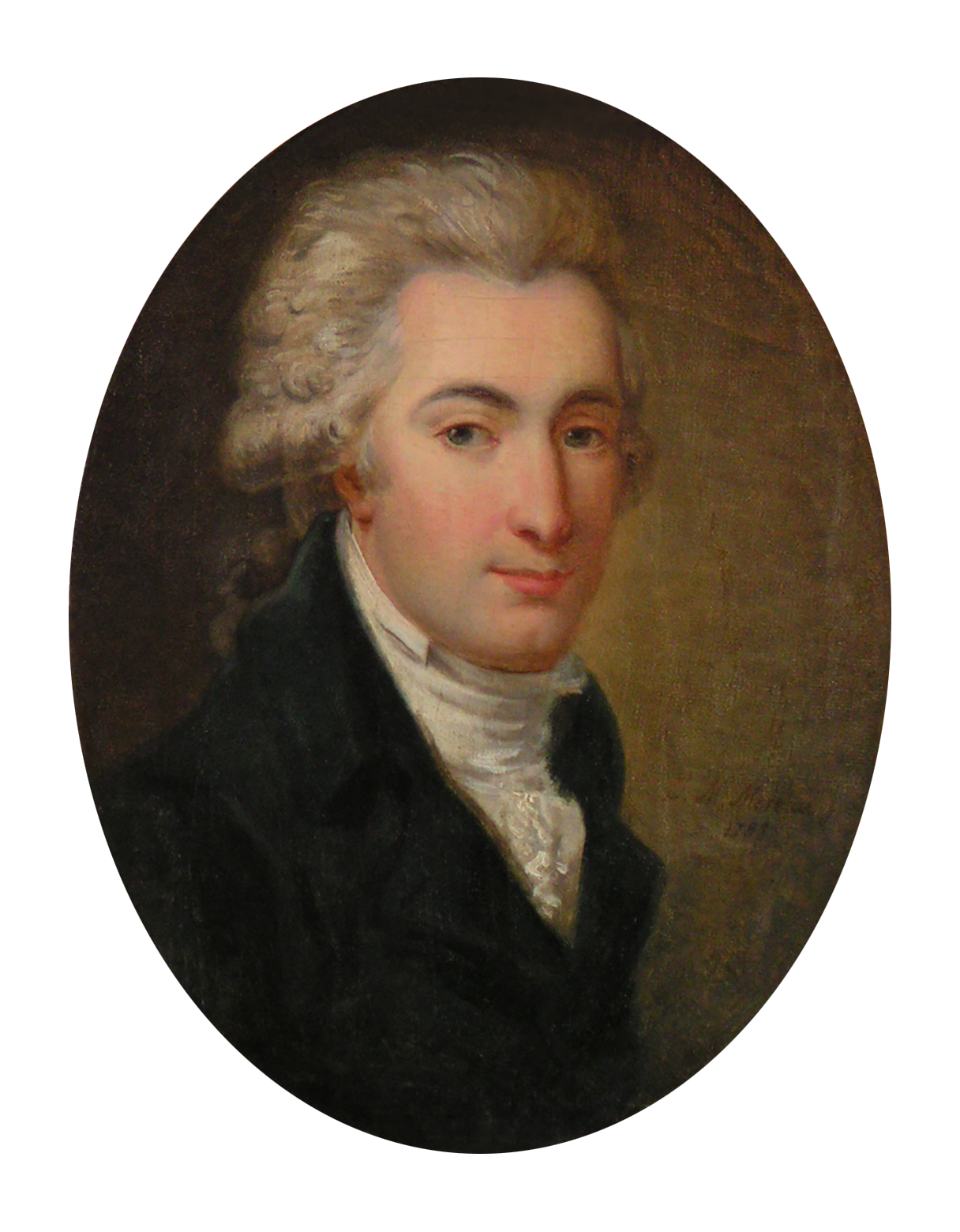
Louis-Antoine Duke of Enghien, by Jean-Michel Moreau, ca. 1800.

During the French Revolution, just like her brother Philippe Égalité, Bathilde discovered democracy. Her royalist husband and son both left France after the storming of the Bastille. As the Ancien Régime crumbled, she took the name Citoyenne Vérité (Citizeness Truth) and offered her wealth to the French First Republic before it could be confiscated. In April 1793, her nephew, the young Duke of Chartres (future Louis Philippe, King of the French), fled France and sought asylum with the Austrians. In retribution, the National Convention decreed the imprisonment of all Bourbons remaining in France.

While other members of the Orléans family still in France were kept under house arrest, Bathilde, Philippe Égalité and his sons were imprisoned in the Fort Saint-Jean in Marseille. Badly rewarded for her fidelity to the democratic ideals of the Revolution, she survived a year and a half in a prison cell. In November of the same year, her brother was guillotined. Bathilde was liberated during the Thermidorian Reaction and returned to her Élysée residence in Paris. To support herself, she rented out most of the palace.

In 1797, the Directoire decided to exile the last of the Bourbons still living in France. With her sister-in-law, the Duchess of Orléans, Bathilde was sent to Spain with her daughter. It was in Barcelona that she learnt of the death of her son, Louis Antoine, Duke of Enghien, kidnapped and executed by firing squad in the moat of the Château de Vincennes.

== Return to France ==
In 1815, at the start of the Bourbon Restoration, Louis XVIII traded with her the Hôtel Matignon for the Élysée Palace. She promptly installed a community of nuns on the premises and charged them with praying for the souls of the victims of the Revolution. Bathilde saw her husband frequently; there was talk of divorce or of reconciliation but nothing came of either. In 1818, upon the death of her estranged father-in-law, she became the last princesse de Condé. That year she founded, in memory of her son, l'hospice d'Enghien at Reuilly near Paris, a home for the elderly and especially former servants of the d'Orléans family. Catherine Labouré worked at the home. Bathilde spent the rest of her life helping orphans, the poor and infirm.

In 1822, while Bathilde was taking part in a procession to the Panthéon, she collapsed and lost consciousness. She was carried into the home of a professor who taught at the Sorbonne, where she died. After her death, her nephew, Louis-Philippe, wanting to give an air of respectability to her life, burned the manuscript of her memoirs. She was buried in the Orléans family chapel her sister-in-law, the Duchess of Orléans, who had died in 1821, had built in Collégiale de Dreux in 1816, as the final resting place for the Orléans family.

== Issue ==
1. Louis Antoine de Bourbon, Duke of Enghien (2 August 1772 – 21 March 1804) married Charlotte Louise de Rohan but died without issue.
2. Adélaïde-Victoire Dumassy (1778 – 1846), married Joseph-Antoine Gros and had issue, among them was Baron Jean-Baptiste-Louis Gros, a French diplomat and later senator, as well as a notable pioneer of photography. One of her descendants was the World War I fighter ace Georges Guynemer.

== Ancestors ==
Ancestors of Bathilde d'Orléans

8. Philippe II, Duke of Orléans
4. Louis, Duke of Orléans
9. Françoise Marie de Bourbon
2. Louis Philippe I, Duke of Orléans
10. Louis William, Margrave of Baden-Baden
5. Auguste of Baden-Baden
11. Sibylle of Saxe-Lauenburg
1. Bathilde d'Orléans
12. François Louis, Prince of Conti
6. Louis Armand II, Prince of Conti
13. Marie Thérèse de Bourbon
3. Louise Henriette de Bourbon
14. Louis III, Prince of Condé
7. Louise Élisabeth de Bourbon
15. Louise Françoise de Bourbon
