= Outline of the Civil Constitution of the Clergy =

Put the Catholic Church in France under government control

The Civil Constitution of the Clergy (French: "Constitution civile du clergé") was a law passed on 12 July 1790 during the French Revolution, that caused the immediate subordination of the Catholic Church in France to the French government.

The following outline of the document, in modern English, includes some explanations of what was implied by the specific Article in the document. The outline is based on two sources in order to provide a clearer explanation of each Article and Title. The Civil Constitution of the Clergy's main accomplishment was placing the church under the state, this document outlines the rules and regulations the Clergy had to follow. For a more in depth understanding of the document and the actions prior to, and after, its enactment please see the Civil Constitution of the Clergy.

== Introduction ==
The National Assembly has heard the report of the ecclesiastical committee and as a result has decreed the following as constitutional articles:

== Title I ==
=== Article I ===
- Each department is a diocese and they all should have the same size and limitation.

=== Article II ===
- All bishoprics that are not in included by name in this article are forever eliminated.
- The Kingdom is divided into ten metropolitan districts.
  - To be overseen at Rouen, Rheims, Besançon, Rennes, Paris, Bourges, Bordeaux, Toulouse, Aix, and Lyons.

=== Article IV ===
- No church or administrative district or citizen may take orders from a Bishop or Archbishop who takes orders from outside of France or represents France from a location that is not French.

=== Article VI ===
- All parishes are to be rearranged by the Bishop and those who administer the district.
  - They shall do this based on the rules that will be imposed.

=== Article XX ===
- All titles and offices other than those mentioned in the present constitution, dignities, canonries, prebends, half prebends, chapels, chaplainships, both in cathedral and collegiate churches, all regular and secular chapters for either sex, abbacies and priorships, both regular and in commendam, for either sex, as well as all other benefices and prestimonies in general, of whatever kind or denomination, are abolished permanently and cannot be reinstated in the future.

== Title II ==
=== Article I ===
- Once the decree is published bishops and parish priests are elected.

=== Article II ===
- Elections are to be conducted through a ballot system and the person with majority is elected.

=== Article III ===
- Bishop elections are to be done in accordance with the decree established December 22, 1789 (the section called: for the election of members of the departmental assembly).

=== Article VI ===
- The election of the Bishop must take place on a Sunday.
- The election must take place at the principal church of the chief town of the department.
- The election must take place at the close of the parish mass.
  - All those partaking in the election must be present.

=== Article VII ===
- To become a bishop the individual must have at least fifteen years in the completion of the following duties:
  - The duties of the church ministry in the diocese.
  - The duty of a parish priest.
  - The duty of an officiating minister.
  - The duty of a curate.
  - The duty of a superior.
  - The duty of directing vicar of the seminary.

=== Article XIX ===
- A newly elected bishop may not apply to the pope for confirmation of his position.
- The newly elected bishop is to write to the pope (since he is the known head of the universal Church) in order to represent that there is unity of faith and communion with the known head.

=== Article XXI ===
- Before starting the ceremony of consecration the newly elected bishop must take a "solemn oath" (also known as the Obligatory Oath).
  - This oath must be done before municipal officers, the people, and the clergy.
  - The oath must include that the newly elected bishop will:
    - Guard those in his diocese who have confided in him.
    - Be loyal to the nation of France (this includes the law and the king).
    - Support the constitution that is decreed by the National Assembly and accepted by the king.

=== Article XXV ===
- Parish priest elections are to be done in accordance with the decree established December 22, 1789 (the section called: for the election of members of the administrative assembly of the district).

=== Article XI ===
- Bishoprics and cures will be considered vacant until the elected officials have taken the oath that is mentioned in Article XXI of this document.

== Title III ==
=== Article I ===
- Those ministers of religion who perform the first and most important functions of society are required to constantly live where they work since the people have confided in them.
- Those mentioned above will have the support of France.

=== Article II ===
- Every bishop, priest, and officiating clergyman in a chapel of ease must be provided with a suitable dwelling.
  - The occupant of the dwelling is to make all the necessary repairs for the dwelling.
    - Even those that existed when the dwelling was provided.

=== Article III ===
- District Bishop salaries
- The bishop of Paris will receive 50,000 livres.
- The bishops of a city that has a population greater than 50,000 will receive 20,000 livres. * All other bishops will receive 12,000 livres.

=== Article V ===
- Parish priest salaries:
  - Parish priests in Paris will receive 6,000 livres.
  - Parish priests in cities that have a population greater than 50,000 will receive 4,000 livres.
  - Parish priests in cities and towns that have a population between 10,001 and 50,000 will receive 3,000 livres.
  - Parish priests in cities and towns that have a population between 3,001 and 10,000 will receive 2,400 livres.
  - Parish priests in cities, towns, and villages that have a population between 2,501 and 3,000 will receive 2,000 livres.
  - Parish priests in cities, towns, and villages that have a population between 2,001 and 2,500 will receive 1,800 livres.
  - Parish priests in cities, towns, and villages that have a population between 1,000 and 2,000 will receive 1,500 livres.
  - Parish priests in cities, towns, and villages that have a population below 1,000 will receive 1,200 livres.

=== Article VII ===
- Those receiving salaries will receive them from the treasurer of the district every three months. The payments will be made in advance (before they perform the service).

=== Article XII ===
- In view of the salary which is assured to them by the present constitution, the bishops, parish priests, and curates shall perform the episcopal and priestly functions gratis.
- Since a salary is assured (through this document and the constitution) bishops, parish priests, and curates are to conduct the episcopal and priestly functions for free.
  - The salary is not a payment for their services. Their services are to be performed for free.

== Title IV ==
=== Article I ===
- The law requiring those who perform ecclesiastic to live within the district will be strictly enforced.
  - There will be no exceptions or distinction for any individual serving in an ecclesiastic office.

=== Article II ===
- No bishop may be absent from his diocese for a period longer than two consecutive weeks in the year.
  - If there is a "real necessity" an exception may be provided.
    - The exception must have the consent of the directory of the department in which the bishop is situated.

=== Article III ===
- Just like bishops, parish priests, and the curates may not be absent from their work location for a period longer than the one stated above.
  - An exemption may be provided for "weighty reasons."
    - The exception must have the consent of "both of their bishop[s,] the directory of their district, and the curates."

=== Article IV ===
- As active citizens, bishops, parish priests, and curates may:
  - be present at the primary and electoral assemblies.
  - be chosen as:
    - electors.
    - deputies to the legislative body.
    - members of the general council of the communes.
    - members of the administrative councils of their districts or departments.
