= Constitutional bishopric =

Office of Revolutionary France

During the French Revolution, a constitutional bishop was a Catholic bishop elected from among the clergy who had sworn to uphold the Civil Constitution of the Clergy between 1791 and 1801.

== History ==
Constitutional bishoprics were defined by the Civil Constitution of the Clergy, a code presented to the National Assembly in July 1790. The pre-revolutionary Catholic Church in France was separate from the government, yet influenced secular policy. This new legal construct incorporated the clergy into secular and made them subject to the national government by re-making them as elected positions.

The Civil Constitution of the Clergy passed by a landslide in the National Assembly on 12 July 1790. Louis XVI affirmed the vote of the National Assembly on 24 August, but the new civil code provoked controversy among the clergy. The National Assembly forced the French clergy into a dilemma by requiring an oath for the new civil code, in effect concurring with a radical reorganization of the Catholic Church as subject to the secular state. Since only a minority of the clergy professed the oath, this created a schism between officially sanctioned "constitutional priests" and non-sanctioned "refractory priests." Pope Pius VI introduced a foreign aspect to the controversy by denouncing the Civil Constitution in 1791.

Constitutional bishops were often priests with less or more moderate Gallican and partisan ideas, of a less or moderate nature. They were elected locally by the same body of electors that elected the députés of the future Legislative Assembly. They organised national councils in 1797 and 1801 to mark their independence from the pope, who usually called major ecclesiastical councils (unlike minor synods).

On the signature of the 1801 concordat, pope Pius VII and Napoleon I of France both demanded that the constitutional bishops and the remaining Ancien Régime bishops who had not sworn to uphold the Civil Constitution all resign their episcopal seats so that new holders could be appointed to the sees. 15 constitutional bishops refused to resign, feeling that their election to their episcopal seats were still valid (one such bishop, Henri Grégoire, signed himself as bishop of Loir-et-Cher right up until his death).

== Selected constitutional bishops ==
A constitutional bishop's diocese was not named after his cathedra or episcopal seat (as was previous practise) but after the department (themselves mostly named after natural features like rivers or mountain ranges) corresponding to his diocese, following the re-drawing of the diocesan boundaries according to the department boundaries created in 1790.

- Yves Marie Audrein, bishop of Finistère in Brittany
- Jean-Baptiste-Luc Bailly, bishop of Poitiers
- Louis Belmas, bishop of Aude
- Claude Debertier, bishop of Aveyron
- Jean-Baptiste Demandre, bishop of Doubs
- Charles-François Dorlodot, bishop of Mayenne
- Louis-Alexandre Expilly de la Poipe, bishop of Finistère, the first constitutional bishop to be elected
- Claude Fauchet (revolutionist), bishop of Caen
- Léonard Honoré Gay de Vernon, bishop of Haute-Vienne
- Jean-Baptiste Gobel, bishop of Paris
- Henri Grégoire, bishop of Loir-et-Cher, better known as abbé Grégoire
- Marc-Antoine Huguet (1757-1796), bishop of Creuse (executed by firing squad on 124 Fructidor, year 4)
- Louis Jarente de Sénac d'Orgeval, bishop of Loiret
- Antoine-Adrien Lamourette, bishop of Rhône-et-Loire (Lyon)
- Jean-Claude Leblanc de Beaulieu, Arch?bishop of Rouen in Normandy
- René Lecesve, bishop of Poitiers.
- Claude Le Coz, bishop of Ille-et-Vilaine
- Jean-Baptiste Massieu, bishop of Oise in Picardy
- Charles II Montault-Désilles, bishop of Maine et Loire (Angers)
- Hugues Pelletier, bishop of Maine et Loire (Angers) in Anjou
- Michel-Joseph de Pidoll, bishop of Sarthe
- Pierre Pontard, bishop of Dordogne
- François-Ambroise Rodrigue, bishop of Vendée
- Barthélémy-Jean-Baptiste Sanadon, bishop of Basses-Pyrénées
- Jean-Baptiste Pierre Saurine, bishop of Landes
- Noël-Gabriel-Luce Villar, bishop of Mayenne

== Bibliography ==
- (in English) Schama, Simon (1989). Citizens: A Chronicle of the French Revolution. New York: Alfred A. Knopf. ISBN 0-394-55948-7.
