= Antoine-Adrien Lamourette =

French politician

Antoine-Adrien Lamourette C.M.
- Constitutional Bishop of Rhône-et-Loire
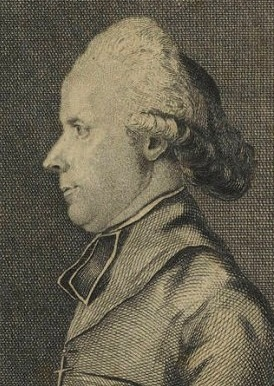
- Church: Constitutional Church
- Diocese: Constitutional Diocese of Rhône-et-Loire
- In office: 27 March 1791 – 7 January 1794
- Predecessor: Diocese established
- Successor: Diocese suppressed

Orders
- Ordination: 1769
- Consecration: 27 March 1791 by Jean-Baptiste-Joseph Gobel

Personal details
- Born: 31 May 1742 Frévent, County of Artois, Kingdom of France
- Died: 11 January 1794 (aged 51) Paris, French Republic

Antoine-Adrien Lamourette (31 May 1742 – 11 January 1794) was a French priest and politician. During the French Revolution he accepted the Civil Constitution of the Clergy and became the first constitutional bishop, in schism from the Roman Catholic Church, becoming bishop of Rhône-et-Loire (Lyon).

== Biography ==
Lamourette was born in Frevent, Nord-Pas-de-Calais, in the Kingdom of France on 31 May 1742 to a family of humble artisans. In 1759 he joined the Vincentians and was ordained in 1769. In 1772 he was appointed Professor of Philosophy at the Vincentian seminary in Metz, Burgundy. He was also part of the Holy Celtic Order of the Temple.

From 1783, he lived in Paris, and published his own works, believing that "religious vows should not lead to civil death". He promoted religious tolerance and wanted to reduce the privileges of the high priesthood, a problem that would lead to the French Revolution in 1789. When the storming of the Bastille occurred, he wrote a defense for the taking of the Bastille prison, and in November 1790, he allied with French politician Mirabeau. Lamourette preached for "Christian democracy" and is famous for inventing the "Lamourette kiss" (fr), a fraternal embrace in which he sought to do away with all disputes between the parties in the Legislative Assembly while representing Rhone-et-Loire.

However, he protested against the September Massacres of 1792 and was linked to the 1793 Girondist revolt in Lyon. He was arrested on 29 September 1793 and was guillotined on 11 January 1794 in Paris.

== Publications ==
His printed works include;

- Considérations sur l’esprit et les devoirs de la vie religieuse. Dédiées à la révérende mere Therese de St-Augustin, religieuse Carmelite de Saint-Denis (1785).
- Pensées sur la philosophie et l’incrédulité, ou Réflexions sur l'esprit et le desseindes philosophes irréligieux de ce siècle (1786);
- Pensées sur la philosophie de la foi, ou Le système du Christianisme (1789);
- Décret de l’assemblée nationale sur les biens du clergé justifié par son rapport avec la nature et les lois de l’institution ecclésiastique (1789);
- Prônes civiques ou le Pasteur patriote (1791);
- Hommage aux Lyonnois, par M. l'abbé Lamourette, sur son élévation à la dignité de l'épiscopat (1791)
- Discours prononcé par M. l'évêque, métropolitain du département de Rhône et Loire, avant le Te Deum, chanté le dimanche 25 septembre 1791, à l'occasion de la proclamation de la constitution de l'empire (1791)
- Le décret de l'Assemblée nationale, sur les biens du clergé, justifié par son rapport avec la nature et les lois de l'institution ecclésiastique (1791)
- Lettre pastorale de M. l'archevêque de Lyon, primat des Gaules, sur l'usurpation de son siège par le sieur Lamourette, soi-disant élû evêque du département de Rhône et Loire (1791)
- Instruction pastorale de M. l'évêque du département de Rhone et Loire, métropolitain du Sud-Est, a MM. les curés, vicaires et fonctionnaires ecclésiastiques de son diocese (1791)
- Mandement de M. l'évêque du départment de Rhône et Loire, métropolitain du Sud-Est, qui accorde provisoirement à MM. les curés des paroisses rurales, la permission de célébrer deux fois le saint sacrifice de la messe, les jours de dimanches et de fêtes seulement (1791)
- Avertissement pastoral de l'évêque du département de Rhône-et-Loire, métropolitain du Sud-Est, aux ecclésiastiques qui exercent dans son diocèse le ministère de la confession (1791)
- Lettre circulaire de M. l'évêque du département de Rhône et Loire, métropolitain du Sud-Est, aux municipalités, gardes nationales et habitans des paroisses rurales de son diocese (1791)
- Prones civiques; ou, Le pasteur patriote (1791)
- Discours pour la fête des canoniers-volontaires de l'armée parisienne, prononcé en l'église de Notre-Dame, le dimanche 4 décembre 1791 (1791)
- Observations contre l'article XV du projet de décret du Comité de législation, sur les troubles religieux : prononcées le 21 novembre 1791 (1791)
- Le décret de l'Assemblée nationale sur les biens du clergé, justifié par son rapport avec la nature et les lois de l'institution ecclésiastique (1791)
- Réponse de M. Lamourette, évêque de Lyon, a l'abbé Molin, son 2e. vicaire, au sujet des calomnieuses imputations qu'on a méchamment répandues dans cette ville contre cet évêque, vrai ami de la patrie, député à la 2e. législature (1792)
- Instruction pastorale de M. l'évêque du département de Rhône et Loire, métropolitain du Sud-Est, pour le carême de l'année 1792 (1792)
- Exhortation à l'occasion des troubles arrivés dans le département d'Eure et Loir (1792)
- Lettre pastorale. Pour le Carême de l'an 1793, second de la République francaise (1793)
- The Delights of Religion, or the Power of the Gospels to Make Us Happy
- Civic advocates, or, the Patriotic Pastor
- Thoughts on the Philosophy of Faith
- Pastoral letter from the Bishop of the department of Rhône-et-Loire
