= Gabriel Villar =

French clergyman and politician

- Constitutional bishop of Laval
- Installed: 1791
- Term ended: 1814

Orders
- Consecration: 22 May 1791 by Jean-Baptiste-Joseph Gobel

Personal details
- Born: 13 December 1748; Toulouse
- Died: 26 August 1826 (aged 77); Paris

Noël-Gabriel-Luce Villar (13 December 1748, Toulouse – 26 August 1826) was a French clergyman and politician. He was the constitutional bishop of Laval.

Villar was principal of the College of La Flèche in 1786. In 1791, he was consecrated constitutional bishop of Laval by Jean-Baptiste-Joseph Gobel.

In 1797, Villar was elected as a deputy to the Council of Five Hundred; he was appointed commissioner for the formation of high schools in 1802. He was appointed a member of the Institut de France in 1803 and member of the Académie Française in 1816.
