= Vého =

- Commune
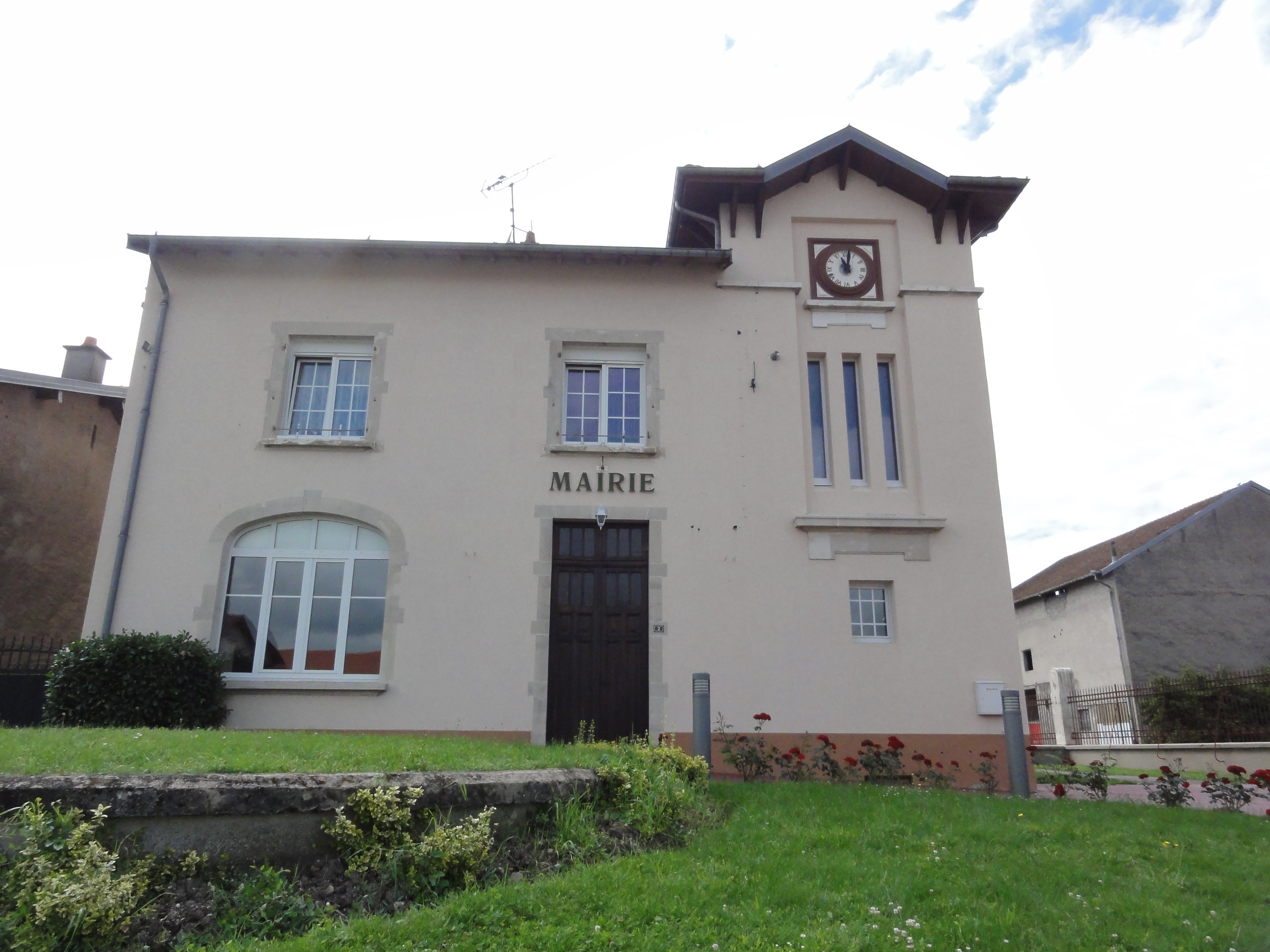
- The town hall in Vého

- Coat of arms
- Location of Vého
- Location within France Location within Grand Est
- Coordinates: 48°35′49″N 6°42′41″E
- Country: France
- Region: Grand Est
- Department: Meurthe-et-Moselle
- Arrondissement: Lunéville
- Canton: Baccarat
- Intercommunality: Vezouze en Piémont

Government
  - Mayor (2020–2026): Jean-Jacques Blaise
- Area^{1}: 7.74 km^{2} (2.99 sq mi)
- Elevation: 270 m (890 ft)
- Highest elevation: 305 m (1,001 ft)
- Lowest elevation: 247 m (810 ft)
- Population (2023): 112
  - Density: 14.5/km^{2} (37.5/sq mi)
- Time zone: UTC+01:00 (CET)
  - Summer (DST): UTC+02:00 (CEST)
- INSEE/Postal code: 54556 /54450
- ^{1} French Land Register data, which excludes lakes, ponds, glaciers > 1 km^{2} (0.386 sq mi or 247 acres) and river estuaries.

Vého (French pronunciation: [ve.o]) is a commune in the Meurthe-et-Moselle department in north-eastern France. It is the birthplace of Henri Grégoire (1750–1831), figure of the French Revolution.

== See also ==
- Communes of the Meurthe-et-Moselle department
