= Christophe Antoine Gerle =

French mystic

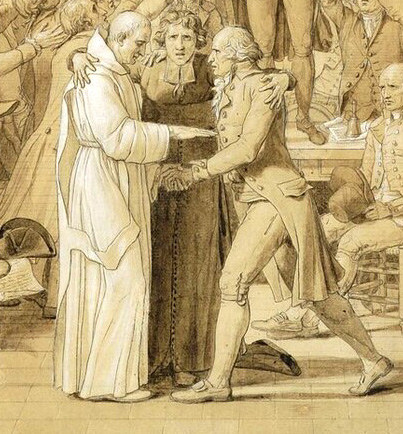
Dom Gerle, painted as present at the Tennis Court Oath, by David.

Christophe Antoine Gerle (October 25, 1736 –November 17, 1801), French revolutionist and mystic, was born at Riom in Auvergne.

Entering the Carthusian order early in life, he became prior of Laval-Dieu in Perche, and afterwards of Pont-Sainte-Marie at Moulins. Elected deputy to the states-general in 1789, Gerle became very popular, and though he had no seat in the assembly until after the Tennis Court Oath, being only deputy suppléant, he is represented in Jacques-Louis David's classic painting as taking part in it. In 1792 he was chosen elector of Paris.

In the revolutionary turmoil Gerle developed a strong vein of mysticism, mingled with ideas of reform, and in June 1790 the prophetic powers of Suzanne Labrousse (1747–1821), a visionary who had predicted the Revolution ten years before, were brought by him to the notice of the Convention. In Paris, where he lived first with a spiritualistic doctor and afterwards, like Robespierre, at the house of a cabinet-maker, his mystical tendencies were strengthened.

The ideas of Catherine Théot—a convent servant turned prophetess—who proclaimed herself the Virgin, the "Mother of God" and the "new Eve," were eminently attractive to Gerle; in the person of Robespierre he recognized the Messiah, and at the meetings of the Théotists he officiated with the aged prophetess as co-president. But the activities of Catherine and her adepts were short-lived.

The Théotists' cult of Robespierre was a weapon in the hands of his opponents; and shortly after the festival of the Supreme Being, Vadier made a report to the Convention calling for the prosecution of Catherine, Gerle and others as fanatics and conspirators. They were arrested, thrown into prison and, in the confusion of Robespierre's fall, apparently forgotten.

Catherine died in prison, but Gerle, released by the Directory, became one of the editors of the Messager du soir, and was afterwards in the office of Pierre Bénézech (1775–1802), minister of the interior. Having renounced his monastic vows in Paris, he is thought to have married, towards the close of his life, Christine Raffet, aunt of the artist Denis Raffet. The date of his death is uncertain.
