= Louis-Alexandre Expilly de la Poipe =

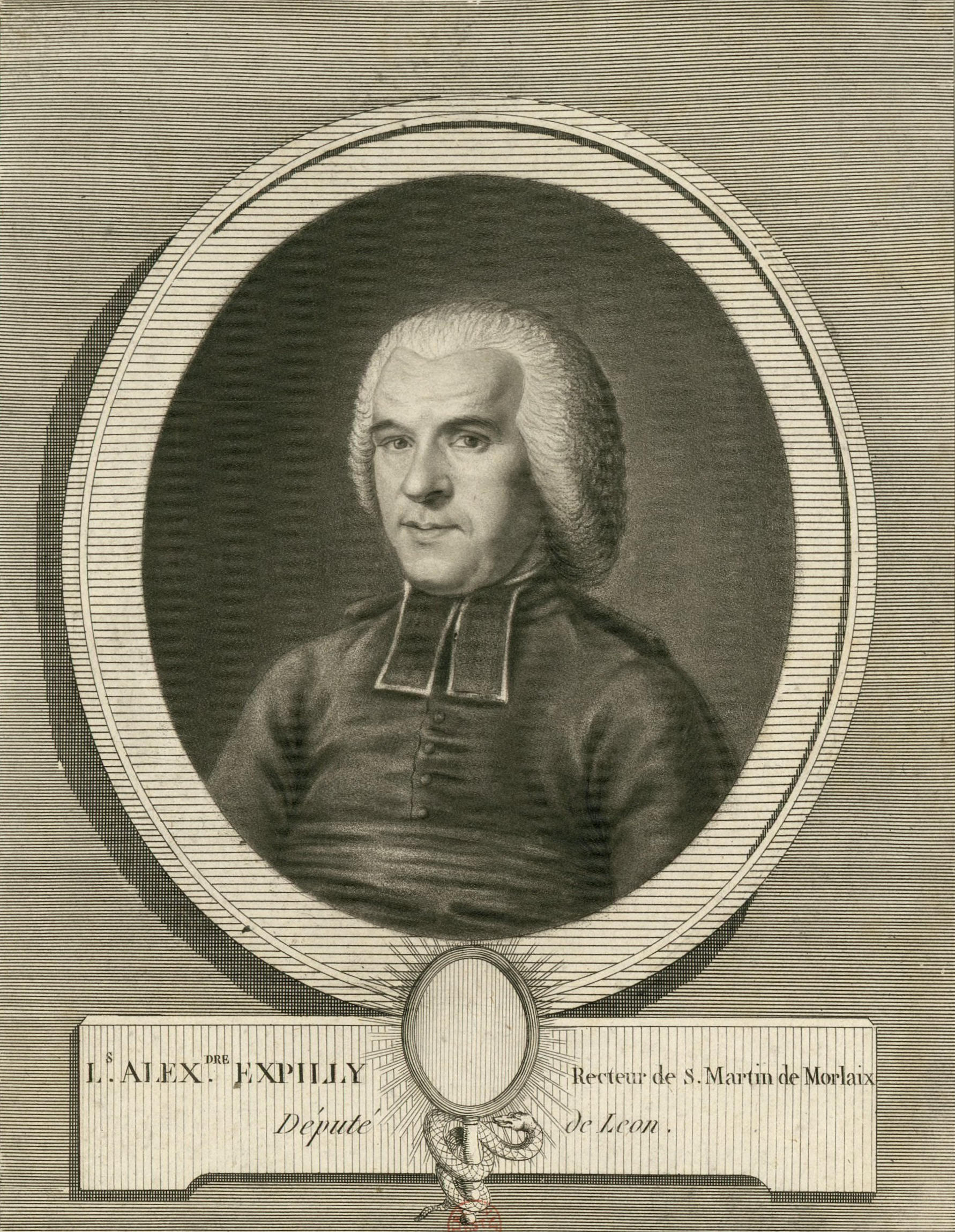
Louis-Alexandre Expilly de La Poipe

Louis-Alexandre Expilly de la Poipe (24 February 1743 in Brest – 22 May 1794 in Brest) was rector of Saint-Martin-des-Champs near Morlaix in Léon, North Finistère. He was one of two deputies elected in 1788 by the Léon assembly of clergy to represent them at the Estates-General convened by Louis XVI.

At the National Constituent Assembly, Expilly was president of the Ecclesiastical Committee working on the Civil Constitution of the Clergy, which in 1790 reorganised the Church in France, notably by creating one diocese per département. The Constitution also stated that bishops should in future be elected, not appointed by the Vatican.

On 30 September 1790 the Bishop of Cornouaille (also known as the Bishop of Quimper) died. His successor would be the first bishop to be chosen by the new constitutional rules. On 1 November, the electoral body for Finistère was convened at Quimper Cathedral despite opposition from the cathedral chapter. Under Canon law, the chapter or one of their number could act as bishop until a new one was appointed.

In a third round of voting, Expilly was supported by 233 of the 380 electors while 125 votes went to the Bishop of Léon, Monsignor Jean-François de La Marche, in exile in London as a dissenter from the new Civil Constitution, and known as a refractory priest. Expilly was proclaimed the first constitutional bishop of France.

Church traditionalists would not support an elected bishop and so there was no-one to consecrate him. The Archbishop of Rennes refused, and in the end, Expilly had to go to Paris to be made a bishop by Talleyrand, the revolutionary Bishop of Autun. The consecration eventually took place on 24 February 1791.

In April 1791, Pope Pius VI issued an encyclical condemning Expilly and Talleyrand.

Expilly was connected with the Girondist Commission des douze (Committee of Twelve), a group which stirred up opposition by a vigorous campaign of arresting "conspirators". He was imprisoned in June 1793, but released in August after modifying his position. However, he did not survive much longer. On 22 May 1794 he was guillotined in Brest, the last person executed that day as he had been giving absolution to his fellows waiting at the scaffold. There would be no Bishop of Quimper/Cornouaille for the next four years.

== Bibliography ==
- Anna Bowman Dodd, Talleyrand: the Training of a Statesman (1927)
- Minihi Levenez, Sillons et Sillages en Finistère (2000)
- Prosper Jean Levot, Histoire de la ville et du port de Brest pendant la Terreur (1870)

== See also ==
- Assembly of the French clergy
