= Henri Grégoire =

French Catholic bishop and revolutionary (1750–1831)

The Reverend Henri Grégoire
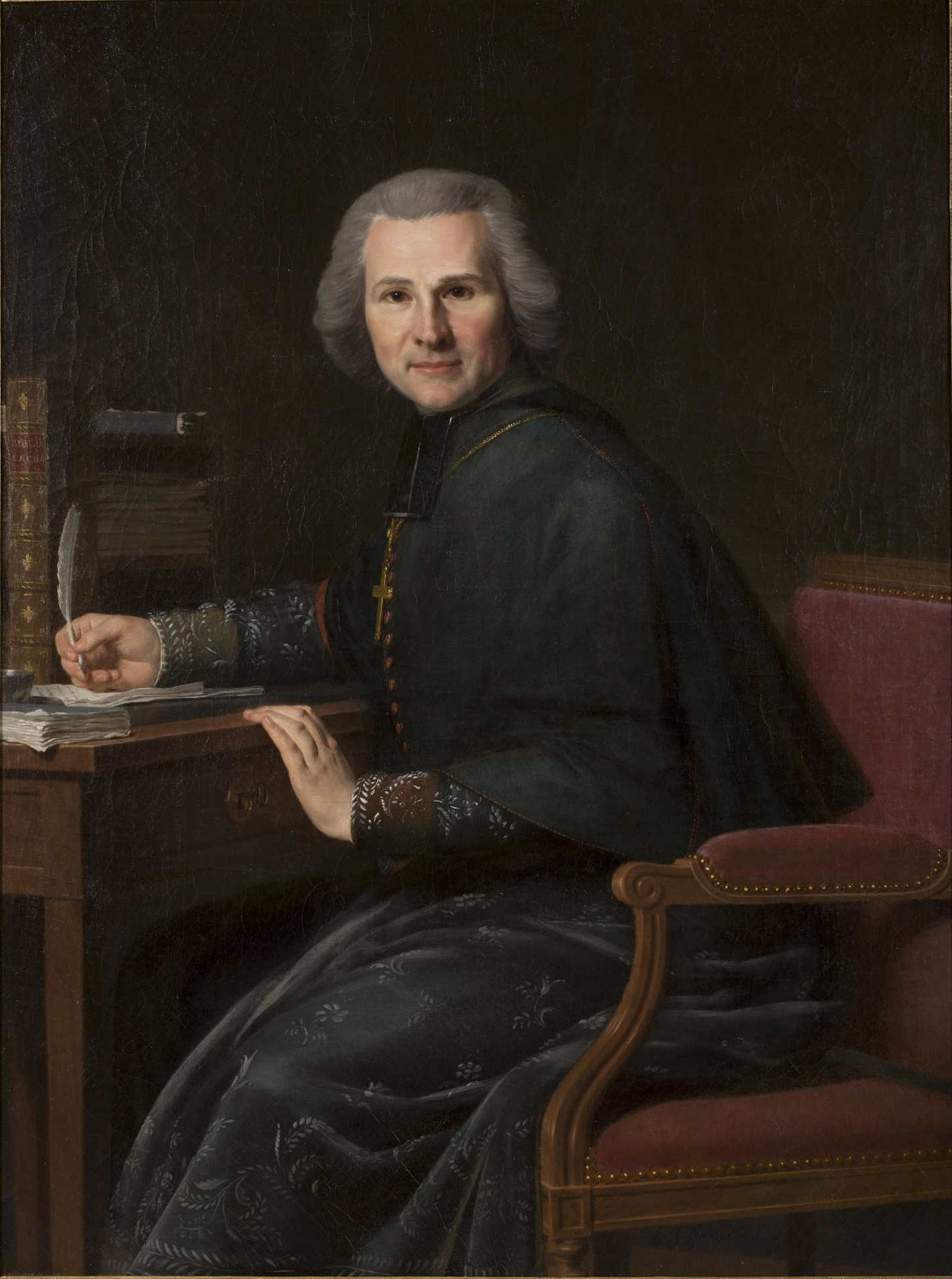
- Portrait by Joseph François, 1800

5th President of the National Convention
- In office 15 November 1792 – 29 November 1792
- Preceded by: Marie-Jean Hérault de Séchelles
- Succeeded by: Bertrand Barère de Vieuzac

Member of the Chamber of Deputies for Isère
- In office 11 September 1819 – 4 November 1820
- Succeeded by: Auguste Ravez
- Constituency: Unknown

Member of the Conservative Senate
- In office 25 December 1801 – 11 April 1814
- Monarch: Napoleon I
- Preceded by: Aaron Jean François Crassous
- Succeeded by: Office abolished

Member of the Legislative Body for Loir-et-Cher
- In office 25 December 1800 – 25 December 1801
- Constituency: Blois

Member of the Council of Five Hundred for Loir-et-Cher
- In office 2 November 1795 – 10 November 1799
- Constituency: Blois

Member of the National Convention for Loir-et-Cher
- In office 20 September 1792 – 2 November 1795
- Constituency: Blois

Member of the National Constituent Assembly
- In office 9 July 1789 – 30 September 1791
- Constituency: Nancy

Member of the Estates-General for the First Estate
- In office 13 June 1789 – 9 July 1789
- Constituency: Nancy

Personal details
- Born: Henri Jean-Baptiste Grégoire; 4 December 1750 Vého, Kingdom of France
- Died: 28 May 1831 (aged 80) Paris, Kingdom of France
- Resting place: Panthéon, Paris
- Party: Left Group (1789–1791); Marais (1792–1795); Thermidorian (1795–1799); Anti-Bonapartist (1799–1814); Liberal Left (1819–1820)
- Education: University of Nancy
- Profession: Clergyman
- Awards: Commander of the Legion of Honor
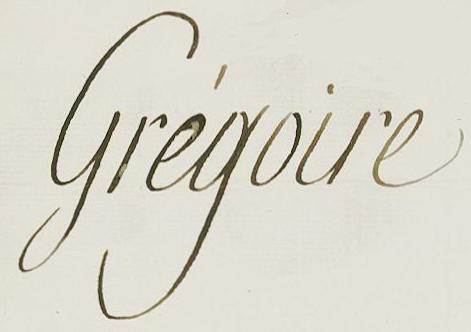
- Signature

Henri Jean-Baptiste Grégoire (French: [ɑ̃ʁi ʒɑ̃ batist ɡʁeɡwaʁ]; 4 December 1750 – 28 May 1831), often referred to as the Abbé Grégoire, was a French Catholic priest, constitutional bishop of Blois and a revolutionary leader. He was an ardent abolitionist and supporter of universal suffrage. He was a founding member of the Bureau des longitudes, the Institut de France, and the Conservatoire national des arts et métiers.

== Early life and education ==
Grégoire was born in Vého near Lunéville, France, as the son of a tailor. Educated at the Jesuit college at Nancy, he became curé (parish priest) of Emberménil in 1782. In 1783 he was crowned by the Academy of Nancy for his Eloge de la poésie, and in 1788 by that of Metz for an Essai sur la régénération physique et morale des Juifs.

He was elected in 1789 by the clergy of the bailliage of Nancy to the Estates-General, where he soon made his name as one of the group of clerical and lay deputies of Jansenist or Gallican sympathies who supported the Revolution. He was one of the first of the clergy to join the third estate, and thus contributed notably to the union of the three orders. He presided in the session that lasted sixty-two hours while the Bastille was being attacked, and spoke vehemently against the supposed "enemies of the nation". He later took a leading role in the abolition of the privileges of the nobility and the Church.

== Career and contributions ==
=== Constitutional bishop ===
Under the new Civil Constitution of the Clergy, to which he was the first priest to take the oath (27 December 1790), Grégoire was elected bishop by two départements. He selected that of Loir-et-Cher, but assumed the old title of bishop of Blois, and for ten years (1791–1801) governed his diocese with exemplary zeal. An ardent republican, he strongly supported Collot d'Herbois' motion for the abolition of the monarchy in the first session of the National Convention (21 September 1792) with the memorable phrase "Kings are in morality what monsters are in the world of nature."

On 15 November 1792, he delivered a speech in which he demanded that King Louis XVI be brought to trial, and immediately afterwards was elected president of the Convention, over which he presided in his episcopal street dress. During the trial, being absent with other three colleagues on a mission for the union of Savoy to France, he along with them wrote a letter urging the condemnation of the king, but attempted to save the life of the monarch by proposing that the death penalty should be suspended.

When, on 7 November 1793, Jean-Baptiste-Joseph Gobel, bishop of Paris, was intimidated into resigning his episcopal office at the bar of the Convention, Grégoire, who was temporarily absent, hearing what had happened, faced the indignation of many deputies, refusing to give up either his religion or his office. This display of courage ultimately saved him from the guillotine.

Throughout the Reign of Terror, in spite of attacks in the Convention, in the press, and on placards posted at the street corners, Grégoire appeared in the streets in his episcopal dress and celebrated daily Mass in his house. He was then the first to advocate the reopening of the churches (speech of 21 December 1794).

Grégoire also coined the term vandalism in reference to the destruction of property that occurred during the Revolution, both that which was ordered by the National Convention and that which occurred at the hands of individuals. In a series of three reports issued to the National Convention in 1794, Grégoire advocated for additional protection of art works, architecture, inscriptions, books, and manuscripts. He is credited by scholars, such as Joseph Sax and Stanley Idzerda, as one of the founders of the idea of preservation of cultural objects.

=== Annihilating the dialects of France ===
The Abbé Grégoire is also known for advocating a unified French national language, and for writing the Rapport sur la Nécessité et les Moyens d'anéantir les Patois et d'universaliser l'Usage de la Langue française (Report on the necessity and means to annihilate the patois and to universalise the use of the French language), which he presented on 4 June 1794 to the National Convention.

According to his own research, the vast majority of people in France spoke one of 33 dialects or patois, and he argued that French had to be imposed on the population and all other dialects eradicated. Although he was natively raised with knowledge of the Lorrain "patois", his conclusion came from a common view at the time within Jacobin circles that the linguistic diversity of France had been purposely used by the nobility of France to keep the various linguistic groups of France separated from one another and from the political institutions in which French was primarily spoken. That made Grégoire see the various patois as limiting to the ability of French citizens to practice their individual rights.

However, his work was still influenced by the rising sense of French linguistic superiority that had been started by Bertrand Barère with Rapport du Comité de salut public sur les idiomes (1794). He thus classified Corsican and Alsatian as "highly degenerate" (très-dégénérés) forms of Italian and German, respectively. In his view, Occitan was decomposed into a variety of syntactically-loose local remnants of the language of troubadours that were mutually unintelligible and should be abandoned in favor of the language of Paris. Thus began a process that was expanded dramatically by the policies of Jules Ferry a century later and led to the declining use of the regional languages in France.

== Advocate of equality ==
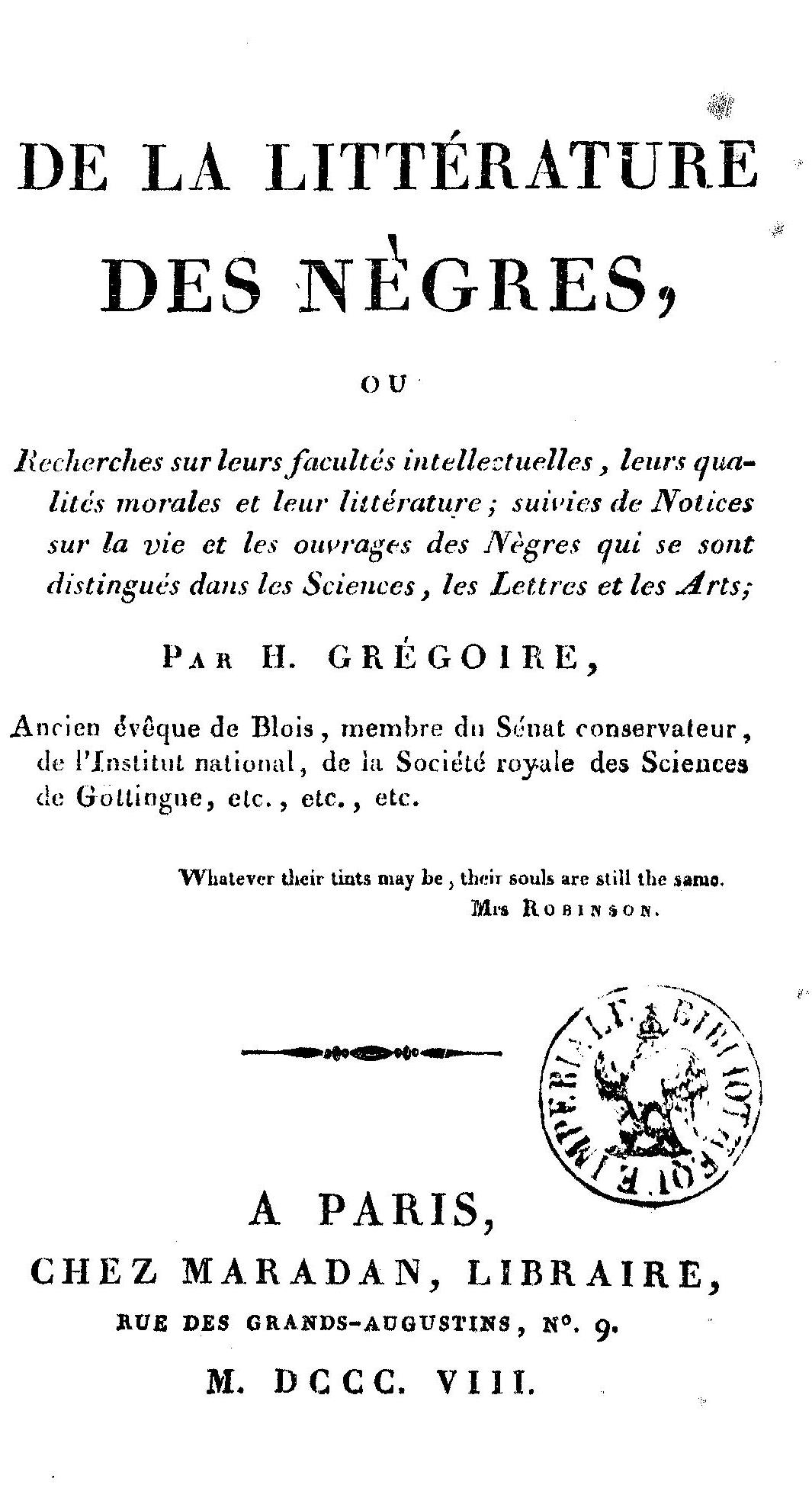
Title page of Grégoire's 1808 book on Negro literature

=== Racial equality ===
In October 1789, Grégoire took a great interest in abolitionism after he had met Julien Raimond, a free colored planter from Saint-Domingue who was trying to win admission to the Constituent Assembly as the representative of his group. Grégoire published numerous pamphlets and later books on the subject of racial equality.

Grégoire also became an influential member of the Society of the Friends of the Blacks although the group and many others like it were seen as radical at the time. As a member of the National Assembly, Grégoire supported seemingly opposing views, such as the eradication of slavery in France, but also maintained his position as a member of the clergy, which was known for mostly wanting to keep slavery within France and its colonies. It was on Grégoire's motion in May 1791 that the Constituent Assembly passed its first law admitting some wealthy free men of color in the French colonies to the same rights as whites.

Later, he was recognized for his work De la littérature des Nègres, which aimed to highlight the intellectual ability of black writers. In 1810, the encyclopedia was published in New York City in an English translation by the Irish republican exile in Paris, David Bailie Warden.

=== Jewish equality ===
Grégoire was considered a friend of the Jews. He argued that in the French society, the supposed degeneracy of Jews was not inherent, but rather a result of their circumstances. He blamed the condition of the Jews on the way they had been treated, their persecution by Christians, and the "ridiculous" teachings of their rabbis, and believed they could be brought into mainstream society and made citizens.

== Political career after 1795 ==
After the establishment of the Directory in 1795, Grégoire was elected to the Council of Five Hundred. He and his fellow council members opposed the coup d’état of 18 Brumaire in which Napoleon seized power. The day after the coup, the Council issued a proclamation warning the coup would cause France to revert to the times before the Revolution.

Under Napoleon Bonaparte's rule, Grégoire became a member of the Corps Législatif, then of the Senate (1801). He was a leading voice at the national church councils of 1797 and 1801; but he was strenuously opposed to Napoleon's policy of reconciliation with the Holy See, and after the signature of the Concordat he resigned his episcopal see on 8 October 1801. He was one of the minority of five in the Senate who voted against the proclamation of the French Empire, and he opposed the creation of a new French nobility and Napoleon's divorce from Joséphine de Beauharnais. Regardless, he was created a Count and officer of the Légion d'honneur.

During the later years of Napoleon's reign he traveled to England and Germany, but in 1814 he returned to France.

After the restoration of the Bourbons, Grégoire remained influential, though as a revolutionary and a schismatic bishop he was also the object of hatred by royalists. He was expelled from the Institut de France. From this time onward, he lived in semi-retirement, occupying himself in literary pursuits and in correspondence with other intellectual figures of Europe. He was compelled to sell his library to obtain means of support.

In 1814 he published De la constitution française de l'an 1814, in which he commented on the Charter from a Liberal point of view, and this work reached its fourth edition in 1819, in which year he was elected to the Lower Chamber by the département of Isère. This was considered a potentially harmful episode by the powers of the Quintuple Alliance, and the question was raised of a fresh armed intervention in France under the terms of the Treaty of Aix-la-Chapelle. To prevent this, Louis XVIII decided on a modification of the franchise; the Dessolles ministry resigned; and the first act of Count Decazes, the new premier, was to annul the election of Grégoire.

== Death, funeral, and transfer ==
Despite his revolutionary Gallican and liberal views, Grégoire considered himself a devout Catholic. During his 1831 final illness, he confessed to his parish curé, a priest of Jansenist sympathies, expressing his desire for the last Sacraments of the Church. Hyacinthe-Louis De Quelen, the uncompromising royalist Archbishop of Paris, would only concede on condition that he retract his oath to the Civil Constitution of the Clergy, which Grégoire refused to do.

In defiance of the archbishop, the Abbé Baradère gave Grégoire the viaticum, while the rite of extreme unction was administered by the Abbé Guillon, an opponent of the Civil Constitution, without consulting the archbishop or the parish curé. The attitude of the archbishop caused uproar in Paris, and the government deployed troops to avoid a repetition of the riots in February of that year which had led to the sacking of the church of Saint-Germain l'Auxerrois and the archbishop's palace. Grégoire's funeral was held at the church of the Abbaye-aux-Bois. Its clergy absented in obedience to the archbishop's orders, and Mass was sung by the Abbé Louis-Charles de Grieu (1755–1836), assisted by two clerics, the catafalque being decorated with the episcopal insignia. The horses were unyoked from the hearse after it set out from the church, and it was pulled by students to the cemetery of Montparnasse, the cortege being followed by a crowd of some 20,000 people.

On 12 December 1989, his ashes were transferred to the Panthéon, the resting place of French notables, in a ceremony at which President François Mitterrand presided. The apostolic nuncio to France, Archbishop Lorenzo Antonetti, and the outspoken Bishop Jacques Gaillot of Évreux attended. The Archbishop of Paris, Cardinal Jean-Marie Lustiger, offered a requiem Mass in Grégoire's memory the previous day.

== Bibliography ==
Besides several political pamphlets, Grégoire was the author of:

- De la littérature des nègres, ou Recherches sur leurs facultés intellectuelles, leurs qualités morales et leur littérature (1808)
- Les ruines de Port-Royal des Champs, en 1809, année séculaire de la destruction de ce monastère (1809)
- Observations critiques sur le poeme de M. Joel Barlow The Colombiad, in 4° Philadelphia 1807 (1809)
- Histoire des sectes religieuses, depuis le commencement du siècle dernier jusqu'à l'époque actuelle (a vols., 1810)
- Essai historique sur les libertés de l'église gallicane et des autres églisés de la catholicité, pendant les deux denrniers siècles (1818)
- Recherches historiques sur les congregations hospitalieres des Freres pontifes, ou constructeurs de ponts (1818)
- Manuel de piété a l'usage des hommes de couleur et des noirs (1818)
- Des gardemalades, et de la nécessité d'établir pour elles des cours d'instruction (1819)
- De l'influence du Christianisme sur la condition des femmes (1821)
- De la liberté de conscience et de culte à Haïti (1824)
- Histoire des confesseurs des empereurs, des rois, et d'autres princes (1824)
- Histoire du manage des primes en France (1826).
- Histoire des sectes religieuses qui sont nees, se sont modifiées, se sont éteintes dans les ... (1828)
- Grégoireana, ou résumé général de la conduite, des actions, et des écrits de M. le comte Henri Grégoire, preceded by a biographical notice by Cousin d'Avalon, was published in 1821; and the Mémoires ... de Grégoire, with a biographical notice by Hippolyte Carnot, appeared in 1837 (2 vols.).

== Sources ==
- ; This in turn gives the following references:
  - A. Debidour, L'Abbé Grégoire (1881).
  - A. Gazier, Etudes sur l'histoire religieuse de la Révolution Française (1883).
  - L. Maggiolo, La Vie et les œuvres de l'abbé Grégoire (Nancy, 1884).
  - Numerous articles in La Révolution Française; E. Meaume, Étude hist. et biog. sur les Lorrains révolutionnaires (Nancy, 1882).
  - Numerous articles in A. Gazier, Études sur l'histoire religieuse de la Révolution Française (1887).
