= Marie Nicolas Sylvestre Guillon =

French ecclesiastic and librarian

Marie Nicolas Sylvestre Guillon (January 1, 1760, Paris – October 16, 1847, Montfermeil), was a French ecclesiastic, and librarian.

He was a librarian and almoner in the household of the princesse de Lamballe. After she was killed in 1792, he fled to the provinces, where, under the name of Pastel, he practiced medicine.

A man of facile conscience, he afterward served in turn under Napoleon, the House of Bourbon and the House of Orléans and became canon of St Denis, bishop of Morocco and dean of the Sorbonne.

In May 1831, he administered Extreme Unction to the republican Abbé Grégoire despite the opposition of Hyacinthe-Louis de Quélen, Archbishop of Paris.

== Selected bibliography ==
Among his many literary works were a Collection, des brefs du pape Pie VI (1798), Bibliothèque choisie des Pères de l'Église grecque et latine (1822–28, 26 vols.; reprint 1828–29, 36 vols.) and a French translation of Cyprian with notes (1837, 2 vol.).

- Epître catholique sur le nouveau serment (1791)
- Collection ecclésiastique, ou Recueil complet des ouvrages faits depuis l'ouverture des États généraux, relativement au clergé, à sa constitution civile, dirigée par M. l'abbé Barruel, avec le concours de l'abbé M.-N.-S. Guillon (14 volumes, 1791–1793)
- Parallèle des révolutions (1792)
- Entretiens sur le suicide, ou Courage philosophique opposé au courage religieux, et réfutation des principes de Jean-Jacques Rousseau, de Montesquieu, de Madame de Staël, etc., en faveur du suicide (1802)
- Éloge de M. d'Orléans de Lamotte, évêque d'Amiens, suivi de notes historiques (1809)
- Promenade des Tuileries, ou Notice historique et critique des monuments du jardin des Tuileries, dans laquelle sont relevées les erreurs commises dans les précédentes descriptions, suivie d'une notice sur le Louvre et autres monuments. Nouvelle édition, avec estampes et spécimen des écritures de Henri IV et de S. A. R. monseigneur le duc de Berry (2nd edition, 1821)
- Bibliothèque choisie des Pères de l'Église grecque et latine, ou Cours d'éloquence sacrée (36 volumes, 1822–1829)
- Histoire générale de la philosophie ancienne et moderne jusqu'à nos jours, ou Supplément à la Bibliothèque choisie des pères grecs et latins (2 volumes, 1835)
- Histoire de la nouvelle hérésie du XIXe siècle, ou Réfutation complète des ouvrages de l'abbé de La Mennais (3 volumes, 1835)
- Modèles de l'éloquence chrétienne en France, après Louis XIV, ou Année apostolique, précédée d'un discours préliminaire, contenant l'histoire abrégée de la prédication en France, depuis saint-Bernard jusqu'à nos jours (2 volumes, 1837)
- Manuel chrétien des enfants (1839)
- Examen critique des doctrines de Gibbon, du Dr Strauss et de M. Salvador, sur Jésus-Christ, son Évangile et son Église (2 volumes, 1841)
- Pèlerinage de Dreux (1846)
