= Clotilde-Suzanne Courcelles de Labrousse =

French occultist (1747–1821)

Clotilde-Suzanne Courcelles de Labrousse, commonly Suzette Labrousse or Suzanne Labrousse (1747–1821) was a French medium, known for her prophecies during the French Revolution, of which she was said to have foretold the outbreak. She was used by the Jacobins and Maximilien de Robespierre as a tool for political propaganda.

== Life ==
Suzette Labrousse was born in a family from the wealthy nobility. She was educated by the Ursulines in Périgueux.

In 1766 she became a member of the Franciscan order. Early on, she viewed herself as having the calling of preaching for the sinners of the world, and was of the view that the church and Christianity must be purified in order for it to raise from its current decay and become powerful again. Her views were not considered to be heretic by the church, and she was given permission by the Bishop of Périgueux to preach in public. Some of her public statements as a preacher attracted attention and she was said to have predicted the French revolution before its outbreak in 1789.

In 1790 Suzette Labrousse arrived to Paris in the company of Pierre Pontard. The subject of her speeches in Paris were anti Papal, and she gave speeches critical of the Papal States and the organization of the clergy in the literary salon of Bathilde d'Orléans. She became acquainted with Maximilien Robespierre and Catherine Théot. In 1792–1793, Pierre Pontard published her writings, financed by Bathilde d'Orléans. In her writings, she interpreted the French revolution as the catastrophy she had predicted, and the Jacobins as the actors who were tasked to tear down the old decadent church in order for it to be rebuilt to a more pure church. She was supported by both Jacobins as well as radical religious reformers, and was encouraged in her ambition to present her ideas of the purification and reform of the decadent church to the Pope.

In 1792 Suzette Labrousse departed to Italy to present the Jacobine ideas of freedom to the Pope as a suggestion for the reformation of the church. She preached in several Italian cities on her way to Rome. Her activities were not welcome in Italy, where she was seen as a heretic. She was banished from Bologna and arrested in Viterbo. From Viterbo, she was taken to Rome. She was sentenced to life in prison.

When Rome was conquered by Revolutionary France in 1798, Suzette Labrousse was freed from prison. She returned to Paris, where she was welcome by her followers. She died in Paris.
