= Civil Constitution of the Clergy =

1790 French law

Constitutional Church
- Classification: Christian
- Orientation: State-controlled Independent Catholic church
- Scripture: Christian Bible
- Polity: Elective episcopal polity
- Origin: 12 July 1790
- Separated from: Catholic Church in France
- Merged into: Catholic Church in France
- Defunct: 15 July 1801

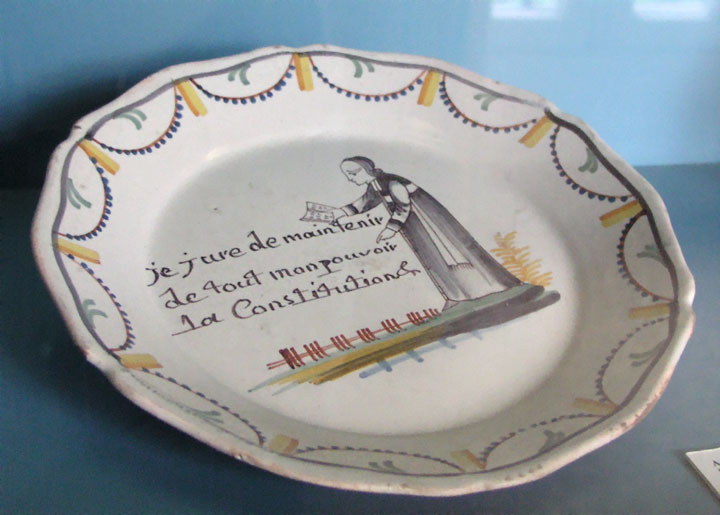
A commemorative plate from 1790 shows a curé swearing to the Constitution.

The Civil Constitution of the Clergy (French: Constitution civile du clergé) was a law passed on 12 July 1790 during the French Revolution, that sought the complete control over the Catholic Church in France by the French government. As a result, a schism was created, resulting in an illegal and underground French Catholic Church loyal to the Papacy, and a "constitutional church" that was subservient to the State. The schism was not fully resolved until 1801. King Louis XVI ultimately granted Royal Assent to the measure after originally opposing it, but later expressed regret for having done so.

Earlier legislation had already arranged the confiscation of the Catholic Church's land holdings and banned monastic vows. This new law completed the destruction of the monastic orders, outlawing "all regular and secular chapters for either sex, abbacies and priorships, both regular and in commendam, for either sex". It also sought to settle the chaos caused by the earlier confiscation of Church lands and the abolition of tithes. Additionally, the Civil Constitution of the Clergy regulated the current dioceses so that they could become more uniform and aligned with the administrative districts that had recently been created. It emphasised that officials of the Church could not give their loyalty to anyone outside the French First Republic, specifically meaning the Papacy. Lastly, the Civil Constitution of the Clergy made bishops and priests elected. By having members of the clergy elected, those clergy within who accepted the State's terms lost their independence and were now subject to the State, since their parishioners would vote on the priest and bishops as opposed to these individuals being appointed by the Church hierarchy.

The Civil Constitution of the Clergy was passed and some of the support for this came from figures that were within the Church, such as the priest and parliamentarian Pierre Claude François Daunou, and, above all, the revolutionary priest Henri Grégoire, who was the first French Catholic priest to take the Obligatory Oath. However, almost all bishops opposed the law and refused to take the loyalty oath it required. Over half of lower clergy also refused.

The law was extremely divisive and proved to be a turning point in the French Revolution. Historian Hilaire Belloc described it as a failure that "lit the civil war" that would occur in the following years.

== Document outline ==
The Civil Constitution of the Clergy has four titles with different articles.

- The document begins with an introduction on why the document was written.
- Title I focuses on the dioceses and how they were to be administered.
- Title II focuses on the administration of the dioceses and how elections were to take place.
- Title III focuses on payment because the Clergy was a salaried employee of the State.
- Title IV focuses on the living requirements for bishops, parish priests, and the curates.

== Status of the Church in France before the Civil Constitution ==
Even before the Revolution and the Civil Constitution of the Clergy, the Catholic Church in France (the Gallican Church) had a status that tended to subordinate the Church to the State. Under the Declaration of the Clergy of France (1682) privileges of the French monarch included the right to assemble church councils in their dominions and to make laws and regulations touching ecclesiastical matters of the Church or to have recourse to the "appeal as from an abuse" ("appel comme d'abus") against acts of the ecclesiastical power.

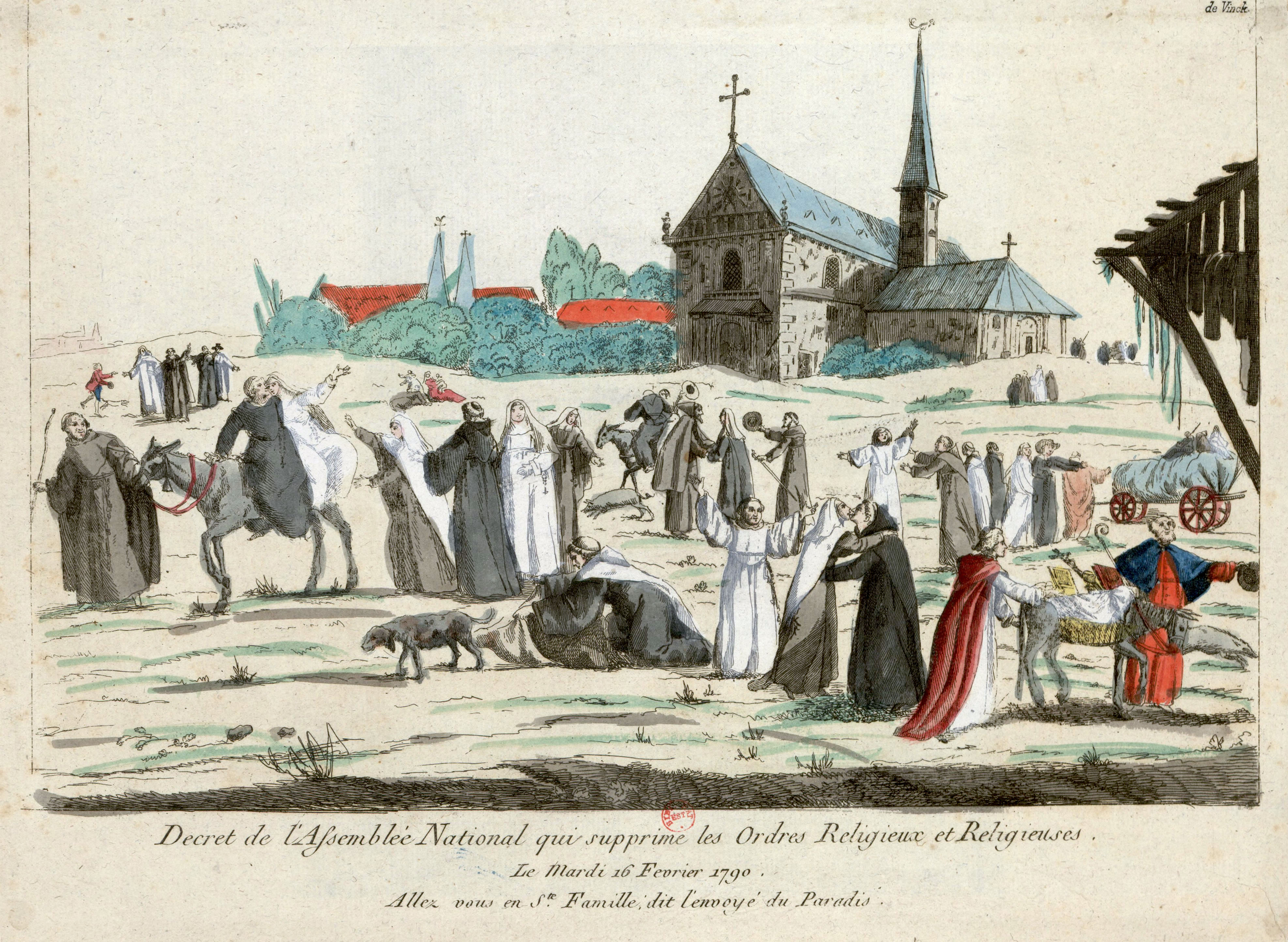
In this caricature, after the decree of 16 February 1790, monks and nuns enjoy their new freedom.

Even prior to the Civil Constitution of the Clergy:

- On 11 August 1789 tithes were abolished.
- On 2 November 1789, Catholic Church property that was held for purposes of church revenue was nationalized, and was used as the backing for the assignats.
- On 13 February 1790, monastic vows were forbidden and all ecclesiastical orders and congregations were dissolved, excepting those devoted to teaching children and nursing the sick.
- On 19 April 1790, administration of all remaining church property was transferred to the State.

== Motivation of the Civil Constitution ==
The following interlinked factors appear to have been the causes of agitation for the confiscation of church lands and for the adoption of the Civil Constitution of the Clergy:

1. The French government in 1790 was nearly bankrupt; this fiscal crisis had been the original reason for the king's calling the Estates General in 1789.
2. The Church owned about six percent of the land in France. In addition the Church collected tithes.
  - The Church used the six percent of the land they owned for a multitude of purposes which included churches, monasteries, convents, schools, hospitals, and other establishments which served the people of France.
3. Owing, in part, to abuses of this system (especially for patronage), there was enormous resentment of the Church, taking the various forms of atheism, anticlericalism, and anti-Catholicism.
4. Many of the revolutionaries viewed the Catholic Church as a retrograde force.
5. At the same time, there was enough support for a basically Catholic form of Christianity that some means had to be found to fund the Church in France.

== Debate over the Civil Constitution ==
On 6 February 1790, one week before banning monastic vows, the National Constituent Assembly asked its ecclesiastical committee to prepare the reorganization of the clergy. No doubt, those who hoped to reach a solution amenable to the papacy were discouraged by the consistorial address of 22 March in which Pius VI spoke out against measures already passed by the Assembly; also, the election of the Protestant Jean-Paul Rabaut Saint-Étienne to the presidency of the Assembly brought about "commotions" at Toulouse and Nîmes, suggesting that at least some Catholics would accept nothing less than a return to the ancien régime practice under which only Catholics could hold office.

The Civil Constitution of the Clergy came before the Assembly on 29 May 1790. François de Bonal, Bishop of Clermont, and some members of the Right requested that the project should be submitted to a national council or to the Pope, but did not carry the day. Joining them in their opposition to the legislation was Abbé Sieyès, one of the chief political theorists of the French Revolution and author of the 1789 pamphlet "What Is the Third Estate?"

Conversely, the Jansenist theologian Armand-Gaston Camus argued that the plan was in perfect harmony with the New Testament and the councils of the fourth century.

The Assembly passed the Civil Constitution on 12 July 1790, two days before the anniversary of the storming of the Bastille. On that anniversary, the Fête de la Fédération, Talleyrand and three hundred priests officiated at the "altar of the nation" erected on the Champ de Mars, wearing tricolor waistbands over their priestly vestments and calling down God's blessing upon the Revolution.

In 1793, the War in the Vendée was influenced by the Constitution passing due to the devout population toward the Church among other social factors.

== Legal status of the Church in France under the Civil Constitution ==
As noted above, even prior to the Civil Constitution of the Clergy, church property was nationalized and monastic vows were forbidden. Under the Civil Constitution of the Clergy:

- There were 83 bishops, one per department, rather than the previous 135 bishops.
- Bishops (known as constitutional bishops) and priests were elected locally; electors had to sign a loyalty oath to the constitution. There was no requirement that the electors be Catholics, creating the ironic situation that Protestants and even Jews could help elect the Catholic priests and bishops. Their proportion in the French population was however very small.
- The authority of the Pope over the appointment of clergy was reduced to the right to be informed of election results, "as to the visible head of the universal Church, as a testimony to the unity of faith and communion maintained with him."

The tone of the Civil Constitution can be gleaned from Title II, Article XXI:

Before the ceremony of consecration begins, the bishop elect shall take a solemn oath, in the presence of the municipal officers, of the people, and of the clergy, to guard with care the faithful of his diocese who are confided to him, to be loyal to the nation, the law, and the king, and to support with all his power the constitution decreed by the National Assembly and accepted by the king.

In short, new bishops were required to swear loyalty to the State in far stronger terms than to any religious doctrine. Even in this revolutionary legislation, there are strong remnants of Gallican royalism.

The law also included some reforms supported even by many within the Church. For example, Title IV, Article I states, "The law requiring the residence of ecclesiastics in the districts under their charge shall be strictly observed. All vested with an ecclesiastical office or function shall be subject to this, without distinction or exception." In effect, this banned the practice by which younger sons of noble families would be appointed to a bishopric or other high church position and live off its revenues without ever moving to the region in question and taking up the duties of the office. The abuse of bishoprics by the nobility was further reduced in Title II, Article XI: "Bishoprics and cures shall be looked upon as vacant until those elected to fill them shall have taken the oath above mentioned." This unified state control over both the nobility and the Church through the use of elected bishops and the oath of loyalty.

Additionally, the constitution did not deny the role of the Pope as the head of the universal Church:

No church or parish of France nor any French citizen may acknowledge upon any occasion, or upon any pretext whatsoever, the authority of an ordinary bishop or of an archbishop whose see shall be under the supremacy of a foreign power, nor that of his representatives residing in France or elsewhere; without prejudice, however, to the unity of the faith and the intercourse which shall be maintained with the visible head of the universal Church, as hereafter provided.

== Delay in implementation ==
For some time, Louis XVI delayed signing the Civil Constitution, saying that he needed "official word from Rome" before doing so. Pope Pius VI broke the logjam on 9 July 1790, writing a letter to Louis rejecting the arrangement. On 28 July, 6 September, and 16 December 1790, Louis XVI wrote letters to Pius VI, complaining that the National Assembly was forcing him to publicly accept the Civil Constitution, and suggesting that Pius VI compromise with them by accepting a few selected articles. On 10 July, Pius VI wrote to Louis XVI, indicating to the king that the Church could not accept any of the provisions of the Constitution; insofar as the church could not tolerate a national legislature, much less one of such secularist and revolutionary inclinations, dictating the internal organization of the church. On 17 August, Pius VI wrote to Louis XVI of his intent to consult with the cardinals about this, but on 10 October Cardinal Rochefoucauld, the Archbishop of Aix, and 30 of France's 131 bishops sent their negative evaluation of the main points of the Civil Constitution to the Pope. Only four sitting bishops actively supported the Constitution. On 30 October, the same 30 bishops restated their view to the public, signing a document known as the Exposition of Principles ("Exposition des principes sur la constitution civile du clergé"), written by Jean de Dieu-Raymond de Cucé de Boisgelin

On 27 November 1790, still lacking the king's signature on the law of the Civil Constitution, the National Assembly voted to require the clergy to sign an oath of loyalty to the Constitution. During the debate on that matter, on 25 November, Cardinal de Lomenie wrote a letter claiming that the clergy could be excused from taking the Oath if they lacked mental assent; that stance was to be rejected by the Pope on 23 February 1791. On 26 December 1790, Louis XVI finally granted his public assent to the Civil Constitution, allowing the process of administering the oaths to proceed in January and February 1791.

Pope Pius VI's 23 February rejection of Cardinal de Lomenie's position of withholding "mental assent" guaranteed that this would become a schism. The Pope's subsequent condemnation of the revolutionary regime and repudiation of all clergy who had complied with the oath completed the schism.

== Oath controversy ==
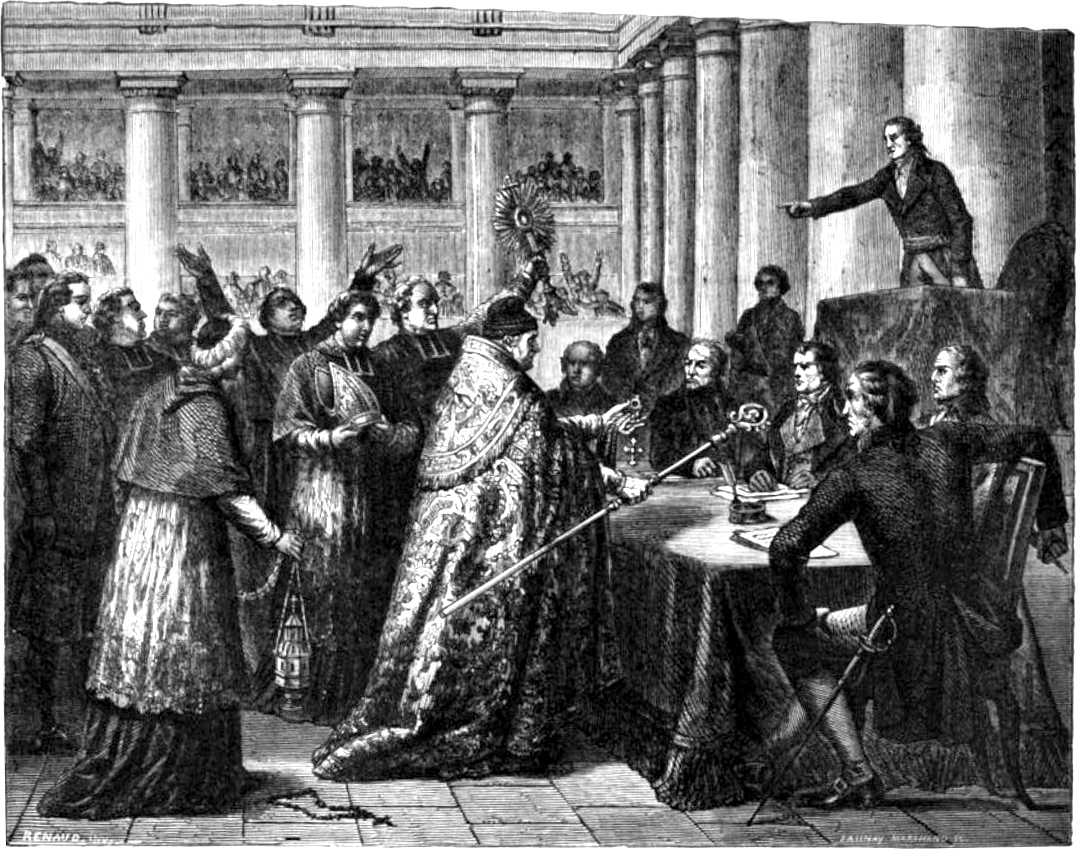
Members of the Catholic Church taking the oath that was required by the Civil Constitution of the Clergy.

Within the Civil Constitution of the Clergy there was a clause that required the Clergy to take an oath stating the individual's allegiance to France. The oath was basically an oath of fidelity and it required every priest in France to publicly declare whether or not they believed the French state or the Pope had supreme authority in ecclesiastical matters. This oath was very controversial because many priests believed that they could not put their loyalty towards France before their loyalty towards God. Conversely, refusal to make the oath signaled a rejection of the Constitution and, implicitly, the legitimacy of the French government (at the time, still including the King).

On 16 January 1791 approximately half of those the law required to take the oath did so, with the remainder awaiting the decision of Pope Pius VI on what exactly swearing it signified and the appropriate response. Among the higher ranks of the church the response was much more negative; only 7 of the 135 sitting bishops took the oath.

In March 1791 Pope Pius VI announced that the oath was against the beliefs of the Church. In doing so, he divided the church into "juring" and "nonjuring" clergy, with jurors being those who took the oath and nonjurors those who refused. The Pope condemned those who took the oath and went as far as saying that they were absolutely separated from the church. Additionally, the Pope expressed disapproval of the Constitution of the Clergy in general and chastised Louis XVI for assenting to it. The law's domestic opponents protested that the Revolution was destroying their "true" faith and this was also seen in the two groups of individuals that were formed because of the oath. Those who believed that the Revolution was causing their "true" faith to be destroyed sided with the "non-jurors" and those who believed that the French government should have a say in religion sided with the "jurors".

American researcher Timothy Tackett believes that the oath determined which individuals would let the revolution cause change and allow revolutionary reform; those who remained steadfast in their opposition would remain true to their beliefs for many years to come. The oath controversy marked a turning point in the revolutionary process since it was the first piece of the Assembly's agenda that provoked widespread opposition.

== Jurors and non-jurors ==
The rate of swearing priests in 1791. The department division is the current one.

As noted above, the government required all clergy to swear an oath of loyalty to the Civil Constitution of the Clergy. Only seven bishops and about half of the clergy agreed while the rest refused; the latter became known as "non-jurors" or "refractory priests". In areas where a majority had taken the oath, such as Paris, the refractory minority could be victimized by society at large: nuns from the Hôtel-Dieu de Paris, for example, were subjected to humiliating public spankings.

While there was a higher rate of rejection in urban areas, most of these refractory priests (like most of the population) lived in the countryside, and the Civil Constitution generated considerable resentment among religious peasants. Meanwhile, the Pope repudiated the "jurors" who had signed the oath, especially bishops who had ordained new, elected clergy, and above all Bishop Louis-Alexandre Expilly de la Poipe. In May 1791, France and the Vatican severed diplomatic relations. On 9 June, the Assembly forbade the publication of papal decrees without its prior assent.

The Constituent Assembly vacillated on the appropriate measures against non-juring clergy. On 5 February 1791, non-juring priests were banned from preaching in public in the hope that this would silence the opposition to the Constitution from religious quarters. Marriages, baptisms, and other ceremonies presided over by a non-juring priest were forbidden. However, non-juring clergy were permitted to celebrate the Mass and attract crowds because the Assembly feared that stripping them of all of their powers would create chaos and arouse sympathy for its clerical opponents. The Assembly permitted non-juring priests to carry on with ceremonies of a private nature until a cooperative (juring) priest could be found for the relevant parish. A large percentage of the refractory priests were not replaced until 10 August 1792, a year and a half after the first round of oath-taking; by the time they began to be replaced the Assembly had revised the legislation and it was not as significant that they were practicing Mass.

At the beginning of the process, when the Assembly was stripping the clergy of their titles, they ignored the violent conduct of the most radical anticlerical elements. However, the hostile reception that some juror priests received in their home parishes forced the Assembly to moderate its position. On 7 May 1791, the Assembly relaxed the law, providing that the non-juring priests, referred to as prêtres habitués ("habitual priests") could continue to perform ceremonies as long as they did not agitate against the Constitution. The Assembly was forced to moderate because the "Constitutional Clergy" (those who had taken the oath) were rejected by many of their parishioners; lifting some of the restrictions on non-jurors was seen as necessary to arrest the growing schism in the French church. The constitutional clergy often required the assistance of the National Guard to suppress incidents of disorder at their churches.

Even within households, differences emerged between Papal loyalists and Constitutionalists. In many cases, women preferred to hear Mass from a non-juror while men adhered to the Constitutional Church. On 29 November 1791, the Legislative Assembly, which had by then replaced the Constituent Assembly, decreed that refractory priests could only exacerbate factionalism and aggravate extremists. In November, new legislation deprived nonjuring priests of their ability to claim rights assigned to the clergy by the Civil Constitution; moreover, nonjuring priests were declared suspect and liable to arrest. Louis XVI vetoed this decree (as he also did with another text concerning the creation of an army of 20,000 men on the orders of the Assembly, precipitating the monarchy's fall), which was toughened and re-issued a year later.

The Holy September Martyrs, or Blessed Martyrs of Carmes (Bienheureux Martyrs des Carmes) were 191 Roman Catholics killed at the Carmes Prison in the September Massacres of 1792, consisting of three bishops, 127 secular priests, 56 monks and nuns, and five lay people, the vast majority non-jurors. They were beatified by Pope Pius XI in October 1926.

Persecution of Roman Catholics (that is, non-juring clergy and their followers) by the authorities intensified in the following year from schism within the church to full-throated de-Christianisation, paving the way for the introduction of two short-lived attempts to establish a new state religion, the Cult of Reason and the Cult of the Supreme Being in 1793–1794. During this time, numerous nonjuring priests were arrested and held on prison hulks where many died due to poor conditions aboard.

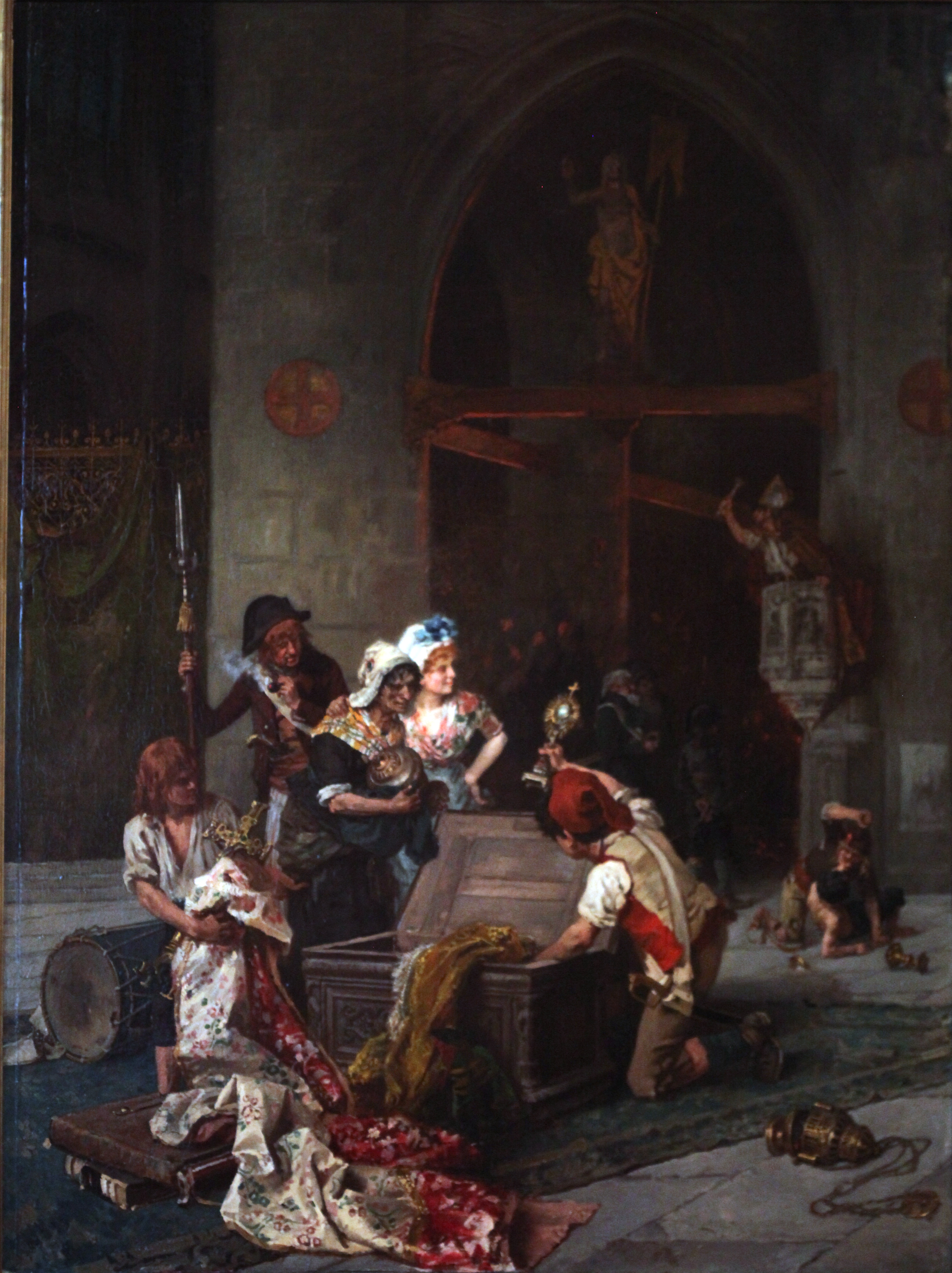
Victor Henri Juglar, Plundering of a church during the French Revolution of 1793, Vizille, Museum of the French Revolution

Although the Constitutional Church remained tolerated, it did not escape the most violent phase of the Revolution unscathed; the National Convention considered Catholicism in any form suspicious. Eight Constitutional bishops were executed on the guillotine, three had been important political figures in the first years of the Revolution: Fauchet, Lamourette, and Gobel. In 1793 Fauchet, disgusted by the Jacobin excesses, joined the moderate bloc in the legislature. He voted in the Convention with the Girondins, exerted himself against the King's condemnation, prohibited clerical marriage in his jurisdiction and expressed deep sorrow for the errors and scandals both of his political and ecclesiastical career. After the insurrection of 31 May – 2 June 1793, Fauchet was arrested and held at the Conciergerie. Along with his Girondin allies, he was brought before the Revolutionary Tribunal on 30 October, and was guillotined on the following day, after having administered the absolution to his friend Sillery.

Adrian Lamourette, Constitutional Bishop of Lyon, had likewise opposed the extremity of the Montagnards. He protested against the September Massacres, and supported the revolt of Lyon against the National Convention. After the Revolutionary government retook the city, Joseph Fouché arrested Lamourette, personally stripped him of his vestments and rode him through town on a donkey with a mitre on its head and a Bible and crucifix tied to its tail, so the mob could spit at and kick him. At the end of this procession the crucifix and Bible were publicly burned, and the donkey was allowed to drink out of the sacred chalice. Lamourette was then sent to Paris for trial before the Revolutionary Tribunal, which found him guilty and sentenced death. Thereafter, he humbly made the sign of the cross, renounced his oath, and declared that he had been the author of all the speeches upon ecclesiastical affairs which Mirabeau had delivered in his own name in the Constituent Assembly. He was guillotined on 10 January 1794.

On 7 November 1793, Jean-Baptiste-Joseph Gobel, Constitutional Bishop of Paris, was forced to abjure in front of a large audience at the National Convention. Three days later, on 10 November, the Cathedral of Notre-Dame was seized and rededicated to the Cult of Reason. Despite his revolutionary principles, Gobel was executed together with Chaumette, Grammont, and many others as a "conspirator against the Republic", on 13 April 1794.

A similar fate befell Louis-Alexandre Expilly, Constitutional Bishop of Finistère, who had distinguished himself in the early stages of the Revolution. Having joined the Federalist uprising, he was condemned to death by the Revolutionary Tribunal of Brest, and executed on 21 June 1794 only one month before the fall of Robespierre. He was the last person executed that day as he had been giving absolution to his fellows waiting at the scaffold. His diocese remained vacant until 1798.

Another prominent victim was the former Constitutional Bishop of Yonne, Étienne Charles de Loménie de Brienne. On 15 November 1793, he had resigned from the priesthood, but his past as a cardinal and bishop made the government suspicious of him. He was arrested at Sens on 18 February 1794, and that same night died in prison, whether from a stroke or by poison; some said by suicide.

== Repeal of the Civil Constitution ==
After the Thermidorian Reaction, the Convention repealed the Civil Constitution of the Clergy; however, the schism between the civilly constituted French Church and the Papacy was only resolved when the Concordat of 1801 was agreed on. The Concordat was reached on 15 July 1801, and it was made widely known the following Easter. The negotiators were Napoleon Bonaparte, then First Consul, and representatives of the Papacy and, such as it remained, the nonjuring clergy. The Concordat was the organic act of the Catholic Church in France for a century; moreover, it legitimised and terminated the confiscations and church reforms that had been implemented over the course of the revolution. The agreement also gave the French government the right to nominate bishops, reorganize parishes and bishoprics, and allowed for seminaries to be established or re-established. In an effort to please Pope Pius VII, Napoleon agreed to subsidize the salaries of clerics in exchange for the legitimization of the state seizure of church property.

== See also ==
- Jureur
- National Religious Affairs Administration

== Sources ==
- Jervis, William Henley (1882). The Gallican Church and the Revolution (PDF). London: K. Paul, Trench, & Company.
- Sciout, Ludovic (1872). Histoire de la constitution civile du clergé (1790-1801): L'église et l'Assemblée constituante. (in French and Latin). Vol. 1 (Paris: Firmin Didot 1872), pp. 182–189. (French text).
