= Catherine Théot =

French visionary (1716–1794)

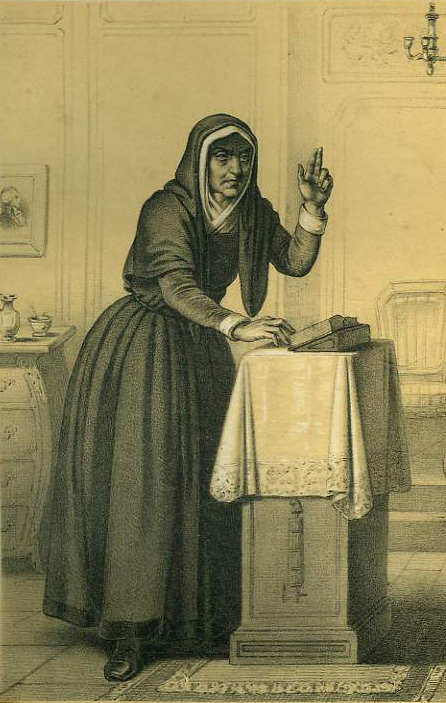
- Catherine Théot depicted in the 18th century
- Born: 5 May 1716; Barenton
- Died: 1 September 1794 (aged 78); Prison du Plessis, Paris
- Known for: Visionary

Catherine Théot (French: [katʁin teɔ]; born at Barenton (Normandy), France, 5 May 1716 ー 1 September 1794) was a French visionary. Catherine believed she was destined to work for God. She gained notoriety when she was accused of being involved in a plot to overthrow the Republic, and the downfall of Maximilien Robespierre was attributed in part to her prophecies.

== Life ==
Théot was born into a peasant family and had many spiritual visions from a young age. In the 1760s she sought official recognition and guidance from the Catholic Church for her visions and was put in touch with Joseph Grisel, a fierce critic of Jansenism, who became her spiritual guide. Under Grisel's guidance she undertook a long course of religious asceticism in the lay convent of the Miramiones (fr) in Paris. However, after many years she had come no closer to having the Church recognize her visions as authentic, and abandoned Grisel, drifting towards more Jansenist views herself before rejecting Catholic orthodoxy entirely.

In 1779 she announced herself to be the Virgin Mary, the new Eve, and the mother of God. After being held for a number of years in the Salpetrière hospital, she was set free in 1782. She made a home in the rue Contrescarpe and began to gather a small group of people who believed her prophecies. She believed that she was destined to be the mother of the new Messiah and was hailed as the "Mother of God". The records of her followers were preserved by the Revolutionary Tribunal and show that she was praying for women on the street whose husbands had been conscripted into the French Revolutionary Army, winning their affection and their loyalty.

== Theotist sect ==
Theot taught her followers that "God had permitted 1789" and that revolutionary laws had been made through God's inspiration. Disobedience to the convention, she taught, was disobedience to God. These and similar beliefs were expounded in small gatherings of around fifteen women followers, in a room in a friend's house. Most of the women who followed her were of humble condition, but among them were also associates of the former Duchess of Bourbon, who consulted Catherine Theot for her prophecies and had sponsored the publication of a "Journal prophetique".

The Theotists saw the redeemer of mankind in Maximilien Robespierre, and preparations for his initiation were put in motion. The enemies of Robespierre, resenting his theocratic aims, used his relations with the Theotists as a way to get revenge. What became known as the "Catherine Théot affair" brought her notoriety in 1794. On 15 June Marc-Guillaume Alexis Vadier announced at the National Convention the plot to overthrow the Republic, accusing Théot and the people who met with her.

On 9 Thermidor Vadier claimed that a letter was found under Théot's mattress that proclaimed Robespierre to be John the Baptist of the new cult. Although the letter was likely fabricated, it was a way to condemn Robespierre for his connection with Théot and his Cult of the Supreme Being. The accusations led to the arrest of Théot and some of her disciples.

The case was tried in the Revolutionary Tribunal, and figured in the proceedings of 9th of Thermidor. The accused were ultimately acquitted and set free. Catherine died in prison one month after Robespierre's execution.
