= Exhumation and reburial of Francisco Franco =

2019 relocation in Spain

In 2011, the Spanish government under Prime Minister José Luis Rodríguez Zapatero recommended that the remains of Spanish dictator Francisco Franco be removed from the Valley of the Fallen, where they had been for 36 years, and be reburied at a location chosen by his family. After a lengthy legal process, his remains were ultimately reinterred at Mingorrubio Cemetery, El Pardo, in 2019.

== Timeline ==
=== 2011 ===
On 29 November 2011, the Expert Commission for the Future of the Valley of the Fallen, formed by the Spanish Socialist Workers' Party (PSOE) government of José Luis Rodríguez Zapatero under the Historical Memory Law and in charge of giving advice for converting the Valley to a "memory centre that dignifies and rehabilitates the victims of the Civil War and the subsequent Franco regime", released a report recommending as its principal proposal the removal of the remains of Franco from the Valley for reburial at a location to be chosen by his family, but only after first obtaining a broad parliamentary consensus for such action. The Commission based its decision on Franco not having died in the Spanish Civil War and the goal that the Valley be used exclusively for those on both sides who had died in the Civil War. Regarding Primo de Rivera, the Commission requested that his remains stay in the Valley but be relocated to within the Basilica mausoleum on equal footing with the remains of others who died in the conflict. The Commission further conditioned its recommendation upon the consent of the Catholic Church, since "any action inside of the Basilica requires the permission of the Church". Three members of the twelve-person commission gave a joint dissenting opinion opposing the recommendations, claiming such action would only further "divide and stress Spanish society". The total cost of the proposed changes to the Valley was estimated by the Commission at €13 million. On 20 November, nine days before the issuance of the report and on the 36th anniversary of Franco's death, the conservative Popular Party (PP) won the 2011 general election with absolute majorities in both the Congress of Deputies and the Senate.

=== 2012 ===
On 17 July 2012, Soraya Sáenz de Santamaría, deputy prime minister and spokesperson of the government, stated during parliamentary questioning that the PP government of Prime Minister Mariano Rajoy had no intention of following the recommendations of the Expert Commission with respect to the removal of Franco's remains, the relocation of the remains of Primo de Rivera within the Basilica, or otherwise since the government considers the report to lack validity in that the commission was "monocolor", for which the PP was not invited or involved, and that in light of Spain's present economic crisis, discussion and opinion as to the Valley would not be considered at this time.

On 10 October 2012, a motion of Basque Nationalist Party (PNV) Senator Iñaki Anasagasti placed before the full Senate calling for the removal of Franco's remains from the Valley, as recommended by the Expert Commission, was rejected by the PP majority. Together with the motion to remove the remains of Franco, the PP majority also voted down an amendment by the PSOE to create a parliamentary committee to seek consensus for the implementation of the recommendations of the Expert Commission. In a speech at the time before the Senate in defence of his party's lack of votes, PP Senator Alejandro Muñoz-Alonso argued there was no consensus at present in Spain for implementing the recommendations of the Expert Commission, and even the Expert Commission, unilaterally formed by the Zapatero government, was not unanimous, and the matter was now totally exhausted after having been raised eight times before the Parliament. He then closed his remarks by quoting from the Bible, saying, "Let the dead bury the dead", and urging the Senate, in light of Spain's economic crisis, to return to addressing the "problems of the living."

=== 2013 ===
On 8 July 2013, a motion before the Senate of the Catalan Agreement of Progress (ECP) to implement all recommendations made unanimously by the Expert Commission – that is, all recommendations with the exception only for the removal of Franco's remains from the Valley – was voted down by the PP majority.

On 5 August 2013, the PP government, in a letter to PSOE deputy and former minister Ramón Jáuregui, reaffirmed its position that the Expert Commission's recommendations would not be carried out since doing so was absent. In the view of the PP government, a consensus in Spain for such action would "needlessly reopen old wounds". Regarding the expenditure of nearly €300,000 to restore the façade of the Basilica, also questioned by former minister Jáuregui, the Rajoy government further stated in its correspondence that such expenditures were justified since they aimed to ensure the monument was well preserved and to prevent deterioration and possible risks to visitors.

On 4 November 2013, Deputy Prime Minister Soraya Sáenz de Santamaría again stated that due to the lack of consensus among Spaniards concerning the future of the Valley, the PP government would reject any legislation or request that would seek to remove Franco's remains from the Valley for reburial at a location to be chosen by his family. She further questioned the urgency of the legislation then presently introduced before Parliament calling for the removal of the remains of Franco since, during the entire seven-year term of the Zapatero government, no attempt was made to change the Valley.

=== 2014 ===
On 23 November 2014, the PP government again reaffirmed its position that, since a social and political consensus was absent for doing so, there could be no changes or modifications to the Valley.

On 17 December 2014, PP and Asturias Forum (FAC) members of the Committee for Culture of the Congress of Deputies together voted down a proposed law put forward by the PSOE to "redefine" the Valley to reflect a "culture of co-existence" and an amendment of the United Left to exhume the remains of Franco and Primo de Rivera, identify the remains of all Civil War victims buried in the basilica mausoleum, and address the claims of descendants whose ancestors were buried there without family consent. During parliamentary debate for the proposal of the PSOE, PP deputy Rocío López argued "let the dead rest in peace" and the Valley was a church and cemetery conceived as a peaceful place "without political significance" for the meeting and reconciliation of both sides of the Civil War that should not be changed or modified; meanwhile, in support of the proposal, PSOE deputy Odón Elorza contended the monument was instead a "symbol of contempt and exclusion" to Spaniards.

=== 2017 ===
On 9 February 2017, the PSOE introduced in the Constitutional Commission Committee of the Congress of Deputies a non-binding motion calling for removing Franco's remains from the Valley and creating a "truth commission" to investigate the Franco years (1939–1975). On 8 March 2017, the PSOE motion was debated and voted on in committee, with only the PP voting no, the Navarrese People's Union (UPN) abstaining, and all other parties voting in favour. On 3 April 2017, the Constitutional Commission of the Senate rejected a motion presented by the PNV to re-designate the Valley as a centre for interpretation of the Civil War.

On 11 May 2017, a non-binding motion put forward by the PSOE calling for the removal of Franco's remains from the Valley and the relocation of those of Primo de Rivera to a less prominent place within the Basilica mausoleum was approved in plenary session by the Congress of Deputies with 198 votes in favour, 1 against, and 140 abstentions. Deputies of both the PP and the Republican Left of Catalonia (ERC) abstained, with the one no vote being made in error by a PP deputy. The motion further called for the creation of a truth commission, the declaration of 11 November as a day of remembrance for victims of fascism, the government undertaking necessary actions for the location and exhumation of graves and identification of the remains of victims of the Civil War and dictatorship, and the Valley being converted from a "Francoist and National-Catholic landmark" to instead a "space for reconciliation and collective and democratic memory, aimed at dignifying and recognizing the victims of the Spanish Civil War and the dictatorship". The PP government responded that it would not act on the PSOE motion as to the Valley because it considered the Valley to be a Francoist monument no longer since it is governed by rules generally applicable to places of worship and public cemeteries and, by law, acts are prohibited at the Valley of a political nature or exaltation of the Civil War, its protagonists, or Franco and the Historical Memory Law does not contemplate or call for the disinterment of anyone.

=== 2018 ===
On 18 June 2018, the PSOE government of Prime Minister Pedro Sánchez, which came to power on 2 June 2018, following a successful motion of no-confidence against the PP government of Mariano Rajoy, announced its intention to remove Franco's remains from the Valley. Since the PSOE had only 85 deputies in a parliament of 350, any legislation to remove the remains of Franco would require the support of other groups. On 29 June 2018, the Archdiocese of Madrid warned the Spanish government against any plans to exhume Franco without first obtaining agreement from interested parties. It formally stated it was against any move of Franco's remains without the consent of his family and before consultation with the Catholic Church. In addition to its statement, the Archdiocese of Madrid reaffirmed that although the Valley was officially a national monument, the Catholic Church must be consulted on burial-related matters under agreements between the Spanish state and the Vatican. The announcement by the Archdiocese of Madrid was made after Sánchez confirmed that he intended to remove Franco's remains by the end of July.

On 24 August 2018, the cabinet of the PSOE government approved a decree amending two aspects of the 2007 Historical Memory Law to permit the exhumation. For the decree to become law, it must be passed by a vote of the Congress of Deputies. The PP and the centre-right party Ciudadanos announced they would not support the decree. The PP further stated it would appeal the measure to the Constitutional Court, arguing that using a decree to change the Historical Memory Law was invalid because the proposed modifications did not respond to a situation of urgent need. At the time the cabinet approved the decree, Deputy Prime Minister Carmen Calvo stated the decree law required Franco's exhumation to take place between 30 days and 12 months of passage by the Congress of Deputies, and the Franco family would have two weeks to designate a place for re-interment of his remains, and that should they fail to do so, the Spanish government would then choose a "dignified and respectful" place for his remains to be re-interred.

On 13 September 2018, the Congress of Deputies – by a vote of 176 in favour, 165 abstentions, and 2 against – approved the proposed decree of the PSOE government to modify two aspects of the 2007 Historical Memory Law to permit the exhumation of Francisco Franco's remains from the Valley of the Fallen. All deputies of the Spanish Socialist Workers' Party, Podemos, ERC, PNV, Catalan European Democratic Party (PDeCAT), EH Bildu, Coalició Compromís, and the Canarian Coalition (CC) voted in favour of the decree. In contrast, all 165 abstention votes were cast by PP and Citizens Party (C's) deputies, with 2 no votes from PP deputies said to have been made "by mistake". After the vote, the PP reaffirmed that it would appeal the legality of the decree on the grounds of a lack of extraordinary and urgent need necessary for such a decree law to the Constitutional Court.

=== 2019 ===
On 15 February 2019, the Council of Ministers agreed to go forward with the exhumation and gave the Franco family 15 days to decide upon its desires for the remains of Franco to be re-interred but prohibited re-interment at the Cathedral of La Almudena in Madrid for what the Council of Ministers described as reasons of "public order and security", and further announced that in the event the Franco family failed to respond within the 15 days, the government would then proceed with the exhumation. The Council of Ministers would decide where to reinter Franco's remains. The Franco family had previously made clear its intention to appeal the government's decision to the Supreme Court.

On 8 March 2019, the Supreme Court admitted the appeal of the Franco family contesting the constitutionality of the agreement the government adopted on 15 February 2019. For its appeal, the family also challenged the constitutionality of the rejection by the government of any reinterment at the Cathedral of La Almudena. On 12 March 2019, the Benedictine Community of the Abbey of the Valley of the Fallen appealed to the Supreme Court about the constitutionality of the agreement of the government for the exhumation, contending the exhumation could not take place without "ecclesiastical authorization". In addition, the appeal of the Benedictine Community disputed the constitutionality of the Decree-Law of October 2018 on the grounds that it would also require the removal of the remains of 20 Benedictine monks buried at the Valley but who also did not die in the Civil War.

On 15 March 2019, the government of Pedro Sánchez announced that Franco would be exhumed and reburied at Mingorrubio Cemetery in El Pardo with his wife Carmen Polo and that the exhumation would take place on 10 June 2019, assuming the Supreme Court did not issue a precautionary order preventing the exhumation until a decision was rendered on the appeals of the Franco family and the Benedictine Community currently before it.

On 19 March 2019, the Francisco Franco National Foundation filed an appeal with the Supreme Court contending the February agreement of the Council of Ministers for the exhumation is "null and void" for violating "openly" not only the Constitution but also the royal decree that modifies the Historical Memory Law and "all the regulations that make up the legal regime" of the B, in addition to European laws and regulations. The Franco Foundation further requested that the Supreme Court stay any action to remove Franco's remains while its appeal remained unresolved.

On 4 June 2019, the five magistrates of the Fourth Administrative Contentious Division of the Supreme Court unanimously suspended the exhumation pending a final decision for those appeals in opposition to the exhumation filed by the Franco Family, the Benedictine Community, the Franco Foundation, and the Association for the Defence of the Valley of the Fallen.

On 24 September 2019, the Supreme Court unanimously ruled in favour of exhumation and rejected the arguments put forward by Franco's family. It was reported that the exhumation could take place before the 10 November 2019 general election and that Franco's remains would be interred in the El Pardo Cemetery.

On 21 October 2019, the government announced that Franco's remains would be exhumed from the Valley on 24 October and reburied at Mingorrubio Cemetery.

On 24 October 2019, in the presence of Franco's relatives and Minister of Justice Dolores Delgado, the coffin containing Franco's remains was exhumed from the basilica in the Valley of the Fallen. The coffin was carried out into the plaza by members of the dictator's family, who exclaimed, ′¡Viva España! ¡Viva Franco!′ (′Long live Spain! Long live Franco!′) as they lowered it into a hearse. It was then secured in a waiting helicopter, transporting it to the Mingorrubio-El Pardo municipal cemetery, where Franco was reburied alongside his wife, Carmen Polo. The Franco family chose Ramón Tejero, an Andalucían parish priest and son of Guardia Civil lieutenant colonel Antonio Tejero, who violently stormed the Spanish Parliament during the unsuccessful military coup on 23 February 1981, to say mass at the reinterment ceremony.
