= Lord of Meirás =

Former hereditary title in the Spanish nobility

Lordship of Meirás
- Creation date: 26 November 1975
- Created by: Juan Carlos I
- Peerage: Peerage of Spain
- First holder: Carmen Polo y Martínez-Valdés, 1st Lady of Meirás
- Last holder: Francisco de Asís Franco y Martínez-Bordiú, 11th Marquess of Villaverde
- Present holder: Abolished
- Extinction date: October 2022

Lord of Meirás (Spanish: Señor de Meirás) was a hereditary title in the Peerage of Spain accompanied by the dignity of Grandee, granted in 1975 by Juan Carlos I to Carmen Polo y Martínez-Valdés, First Lady of Spain between 1939 and 1975 and wife of Francisco Franco. The title makes reference to the Pazo de Meirás, summer home of Franco in Galicia.

It was abolished in October 2022, under the purview of the Law of Democratic Memory.

== Lords of Meirás (1975–2022) ==
- Carmen Polo y Martínez-Valdés, 1st Lady of Meirás (1975–1988)
- Francisco Franco y Martínez-Bordiú, 2nd Lord of Meirás (1989–2022)

== See also ==
- Duke of Franco
- List of lords in the peerage of Spain
