= Angel of Victory (Valdepeñas) =

Monument in Granada

Angel of Victory and Peace
- Ángel de la Victoria y de la Paz
- Angel of Victory as in 2026
- Interactive map of Angel of Victory and Peace
- Location: Cerro de las Aguzaderas, Valdepeñas, Spain
- Coordinates: 38.792892°N 3.387692°W
- Designer: Juan de Ávalos
- Material: Stone, metal
- Height: 25 m (stone bundles); 15 m (statue)
- Opening date: 1964
- Dedicated to: Those who fell fighting for the Rebel faction in the Spanish Civil War
- Dismantled date: Largely destroyed on 18 July 1976

The Angel of Victory and Peace (Spanish: Ángel de la Victoria y de la Paz) or Angel of Victory, is a ruined monument in Valdepeñas, Spain. It was a Francoist memorial designed by Juan de Ávalos that consisted of a colossal statue of an angel holding a sword. The monument was made of a reinforced stone sided by two poles. It was partially destroyed in 1976.

== History and description ==
The Provincial Deputation of Ciudad Real commissioned the project to build the monument and awarded it to Juan de Ávalos. The site chosen for the erection of the monument is located two kilometres away from the city of Valdepeñas in the province of Ciudad Real. It stands at the top of a hill, the Cerro de las Aguzaderas, visible from the Manchegan plain and the Madrid–Cádiz national road (currently superseded by the A-4 highway).

Unveiled in 1964, the sculpture consisted of a 15-metre high angel holding a blade-like cross sided by two 25-metre high stone stakes. The plaque reads "la provincia de ciudad real, como homenaje de gratitud en recuerdo de sus mártires. 1936-1964" ("the province of Ciudad Real, as a tribute of gratitude in memory of its martyrs. 1936–1964"). It served as memorial to the Rebel (Francoist) faction in the Spanish Civil War.

In the early morning of 18 July 1976, during a series of attacks carried out by GRAPO around Spain, an explosive device was detonated in the monument. The responsibility for the attack was claimed by the aforementioned group. The stone pieces of the angel were destroyed with only the inner metal framework remaining. Pieces of the monument were recovered about 300 metres away from the site. Following the attack, far-right Fuerza Nueva organized an event of "redress" in Valdepeñas, in which Blas Piñar intervened and the Cara al Sol was sung. The monument resulted in a semi ruinous and somewhat "ghostly" condition, with the angel being turned into metal clutter, although the two stone bundles remain. The original plaque was also removed.
