= Juan de Ávalos =

Spanish sculptor

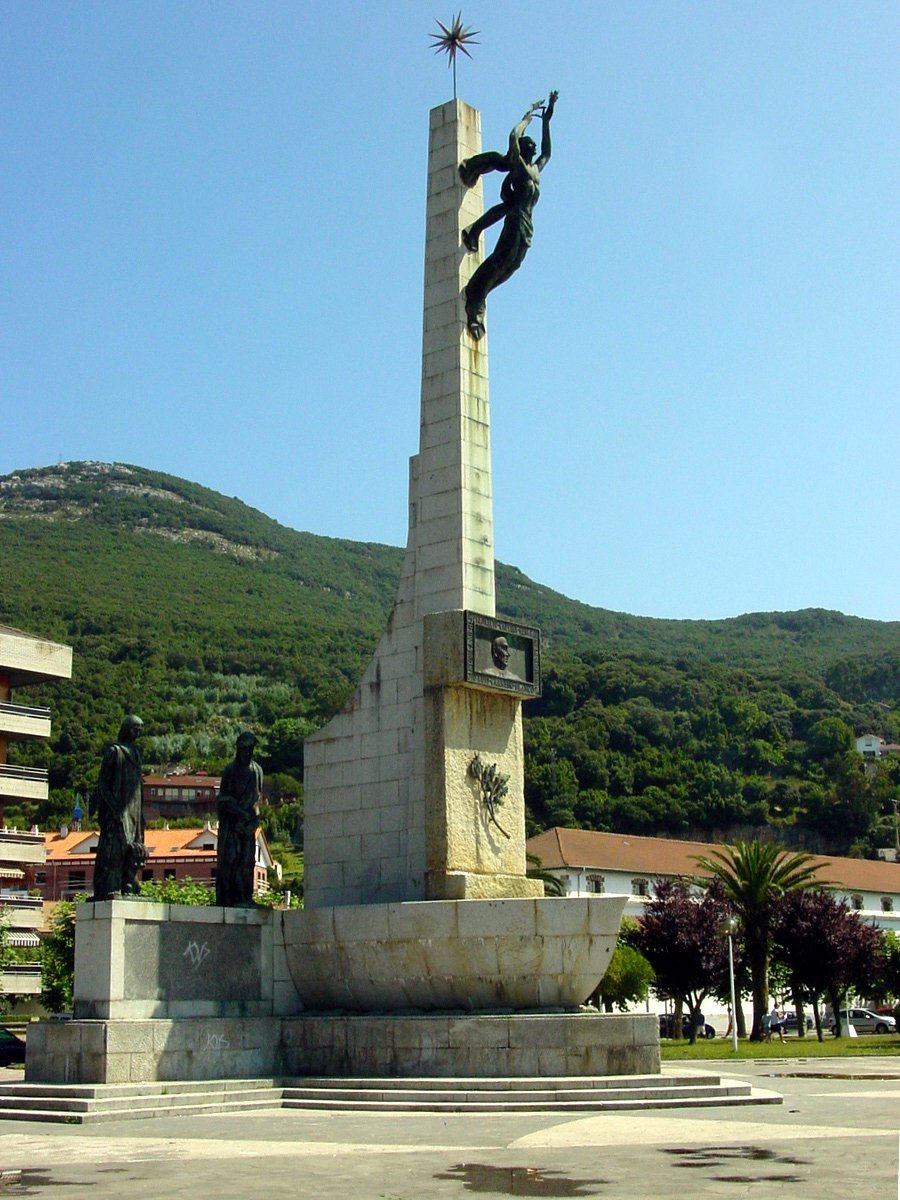
Monument to Luis Carrero Blanco in Santoña, Spain

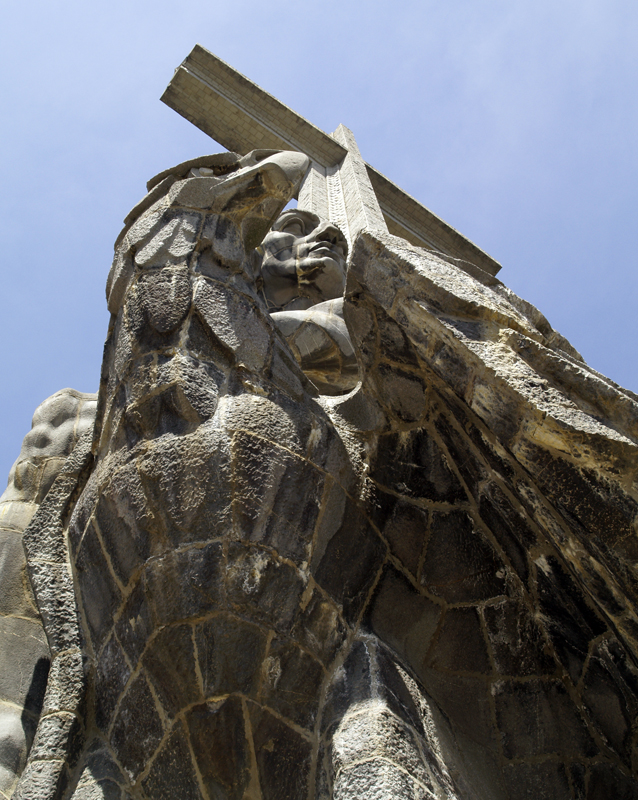
Saint John in the Valle de los Caídos (Valley of the fallen)

Juan de Ávalos y García-Taborda (October 21, 1911 in Mérida – July 7, 2006 in Madrid) was a Spanish sculptor.

Juan de Ávalos began his training very early. As a six-year-old he was a student of D. Juan Carmona, pastor of the Church of Santa Eulalia, who taught him and three other children to draw. de Ávalos's family moved to Madrid shortly after that, as his father's eyesight deteriorated. In Madrid, de Ávalos's father showed his son's drawings to the painter Manuel Benedito. The famous artist was surprised to see the quality of work of a child. He didn't believe a child could draw so well until he went to de Ávalos at work. Convinced of the boy's talent, he advised de Ávalos's father to take his son to the Casón del Buen Retiro.

Author of Los amantes de Teruel (The Lovers of Teruel) in Teruel, Monumento a Luis Carrero Blanco (Monument to Luis Carrero Blanco) in Santoña, Cantabria, his most important works are those of the Valle de los Caídos ("The Valley of the Fallen"), a majestic monument in Madrid where Francisco Franco's body once lay.

He married in 1937 María de la Soledad Carballo y Núñez and had two sons, Juan and Luis de Ávalos y Carballo. Ávalos died in Clínica Virgen del Mar, in Madrid.

== Main works ==
- El Héroe Caído, Badajoz, 1950-1956
- Marinos caídos en el Mediterráneo, Benidorm, 1963
- Ángel de la Victoria y de la Paz, Valdepeñas, 1964
- Cristo de la Paz, Almendralejo, 1965
- Monument to Franco, Santa Cruz de Tenerife (1966).
- Arco del Triunfo a la Independencia in Dominican Republic
- Los Monteros (or Monument to Covarsí), Badajoz, 1968
- Genio de Extremadura
- La Ciudad y el Río
- Bernardo de Gálvez, Washington, D.C., 1976
- Extremeños Universales, Badajoz, 1983
- Monument to Count Diego Porcelos, Burgos, 1983
- Pope John Paul II, Madrid, 1998

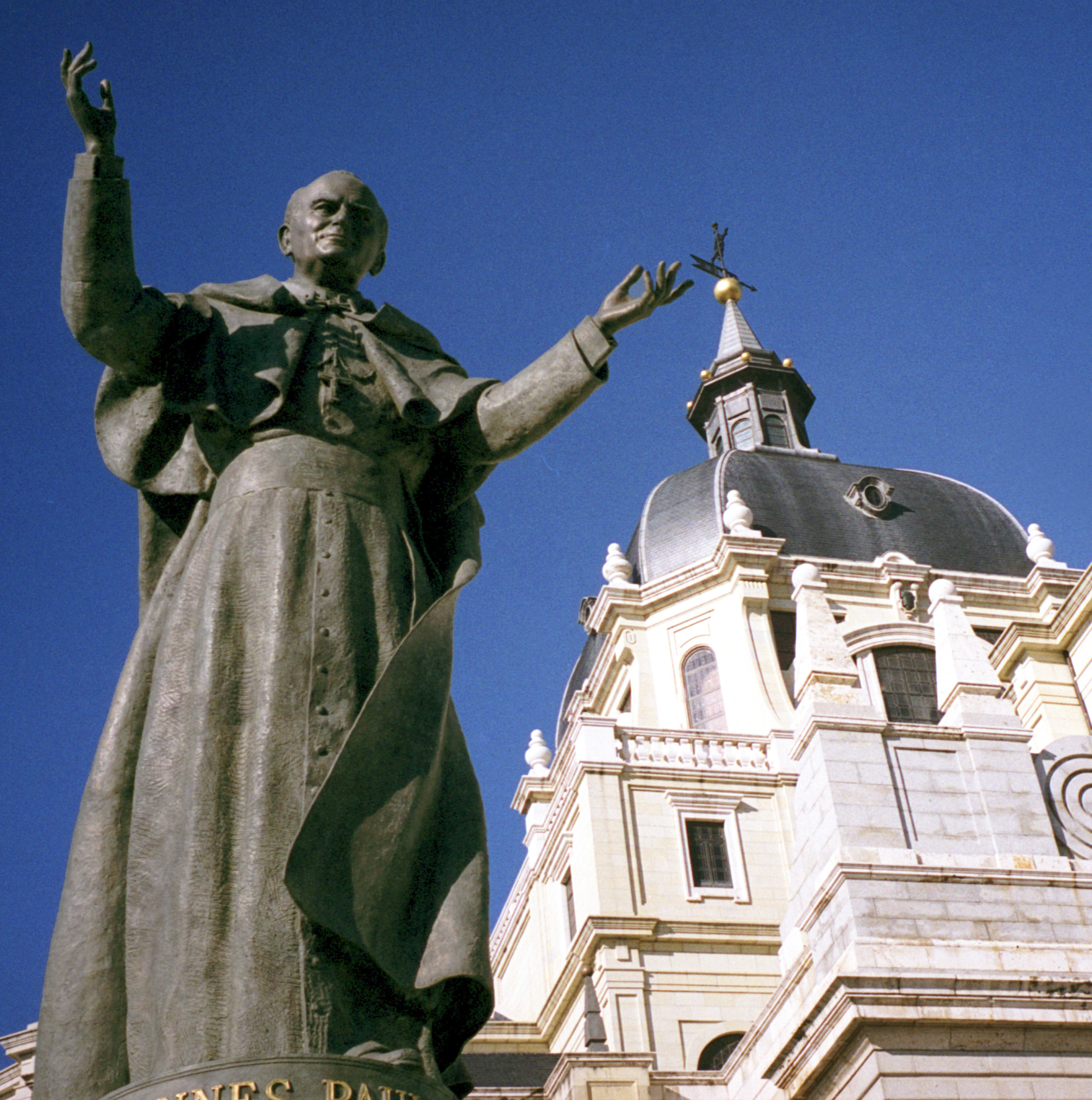
A statue of Pope John Paul II made by Juan de Ávalos.
