= Pazo de Meirás =

Pazo (manor house) in Sada, Galicia, Spain

Coordinates: 43°21′27″N 8°17′46″W

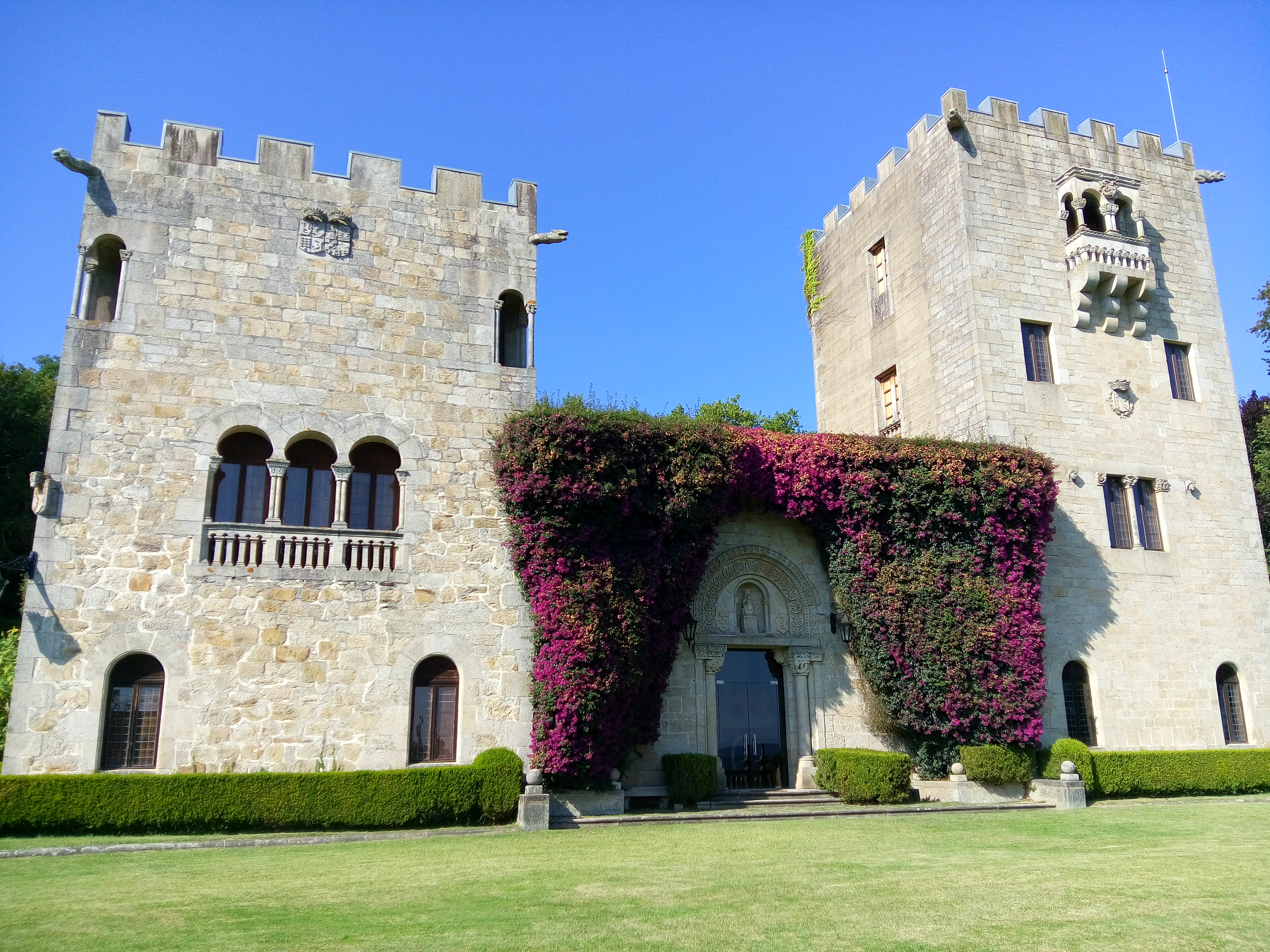
- Main facade.
- Interactive map of the Pazo de Meirás area

General information
- Architectural style: Revivalism
- Location: Sada, Galicia, Spain
- Construction started: 1893
- Completed: 1900
- Owner: Spanish State

The Pazo de Meirás is a pazo (manor house) in Sada (Galicia, Spain). It was built in the 19th century in a revivalist style. It is best known as the former summer residence of former dictator Francisco Franco.

== History ==
=== Construction and Emilia Pardo Bazán ===
The current building dates from the end of the 19th century, with the first stone placed in 1893. Known originally as the Torres de Meirás, it was built on the ruins of an old military fortification, built on land owned by the Patiño de Bergondo since the 16th century, that had been destroyed by Napoleonic French troops in 1809 during the Spanish War of Independence.

Through marriage, the property was transferred to the Pardo de Lama, and then through direct inheritance to the writer Emilia Pardo Bazán, who undertook major remodelling to create the current building layout. The writer married in the chapel - which she called "Granja de Meirás" - 5 on 10 July 1868 and, once the remodelling was complete, spent more than four months there every year. When in residence, she worked in the tower that she called "de la chimera", where her library was installed and remains in the present building.

After Bazán's death in 1921, the building passed to her son Jaime Quiroga y Pardo Bazán. In August 1936, after the Federación Anarquista Ibérica (Iberian Anarchist Federation) murdered Jaime and his son also called Jaime in Madrid, the building came into control of his widow Manuela Esteban-Collantes and Emilia's daughter Blanca Quiroga de Pardo Bazán. They agree to sell the property to the Pazo branch of the Society of Jesus, but after they failed to meet certain conditions the property remained within the family.

=== Franco's summer retreat ===
With the Spanish Civil War now raging, in 1938 the pazo was taken over by the Nationalist faction, for it to be used as a summer residence by General Francisco Franco. After the end of the Spanish civil war, in honour to their new Caudillo, the local Nationalist faction in agreement with the Nationalist government agreed to obtain the property. An agreement of sale was drawn up between Emilia's family and the Spanish state, to acquire the building for the use of the Spanish head of state; although by default this meant that it became the personal property of Franco. To raise the funds required to purchase the property, the local Nationalist faction created a forced subscription, which received donations from local workers, business and government authorities and councils.

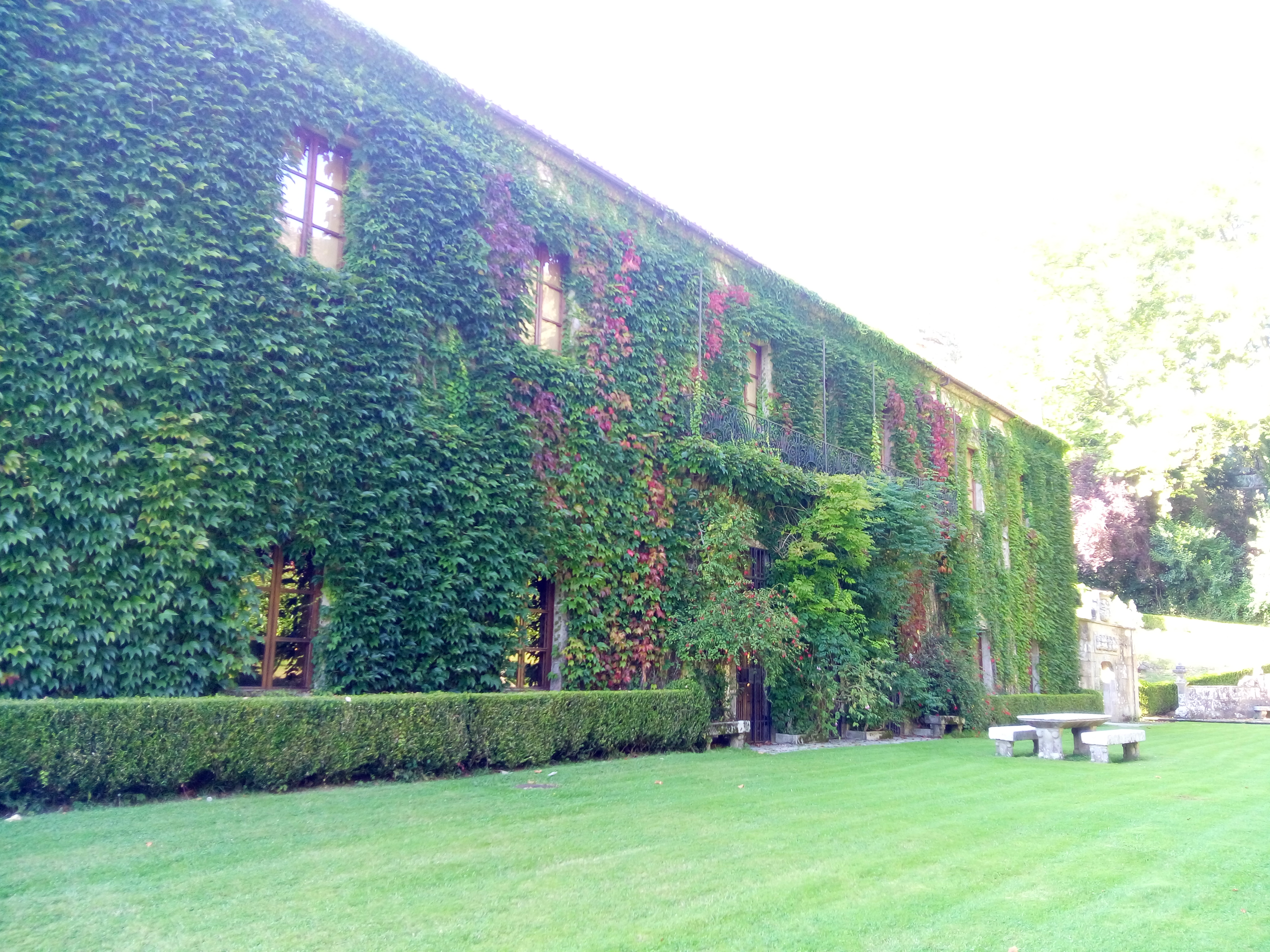
Side view

== Issues regarding ownership ==
After the death of Franco, King Juan Carlos I gave Franco's widow, Carmen Polo, the hereditary title Lady of Meirás. The title passed to Carmen Polo's grandson Francisco Franco, 2nd Lord of Meirás, although her daughter, Carmen Franco, 1st Duchess of Franco, was associated with the house; after Polo's death at the end of 2017, the family put the property on the market in 2018.

The legal status of Pazo de Meirás has been contested in Spain. It has also been raised at a European level by MEP Ana Miranda. She arranged a visit to the property with other MEPs including Jill Evans (of the Welsh nationalist party Plaid Cymru). Efforts by Spain's Socialist leader Pedro Sánchez to seize the property were rebuffed in 2018 by a legal ruling by Ministry of Justice's lawyers that said the donation of the property to Franco was entirely legal and a 1982 law could not be applied retroactively.

In September 2020, a judge ordered the family to return the Pazo de Meirás, ruling that it had been given to Franco in 1938 in his role as head of state and not in a personal capacity. The Spanish State finally took over the pazo on 10 December 2020, after 82 years in private hands.

== Access ==
Pazo de Meirás was given the heritage designation Bien de Interés Cultural in 2008 despite the opposition of its owners. Arrangements were subsequently made for the public to visit the building on a limited basis. In 2017 it was proposed that the tours should be given by the Francisco Franco National Foundation. This generated controversy, given that the Foundation has the role of promoting respect for the achievements of the former Spanish caudillo. However, the Foundation continued to give the tours.

On the occasion of the eviction of the Franco family on December 10, 2020, Deputy Prime Minister Carmen Calvo said the Palace would in the future be used to educate people about the harm done during Franco's reign. In January 2021, the Government announced that the building's exteriors might be opened to the public starting from January 30, although in the context of the municipality's response to the pandemic, it would be open only for the citizens of Sada.
