= Francisco Franco National Foundation =

Spanish foundation dedicated to Francisco Franco

- Fundación Nacional Francisco Franco
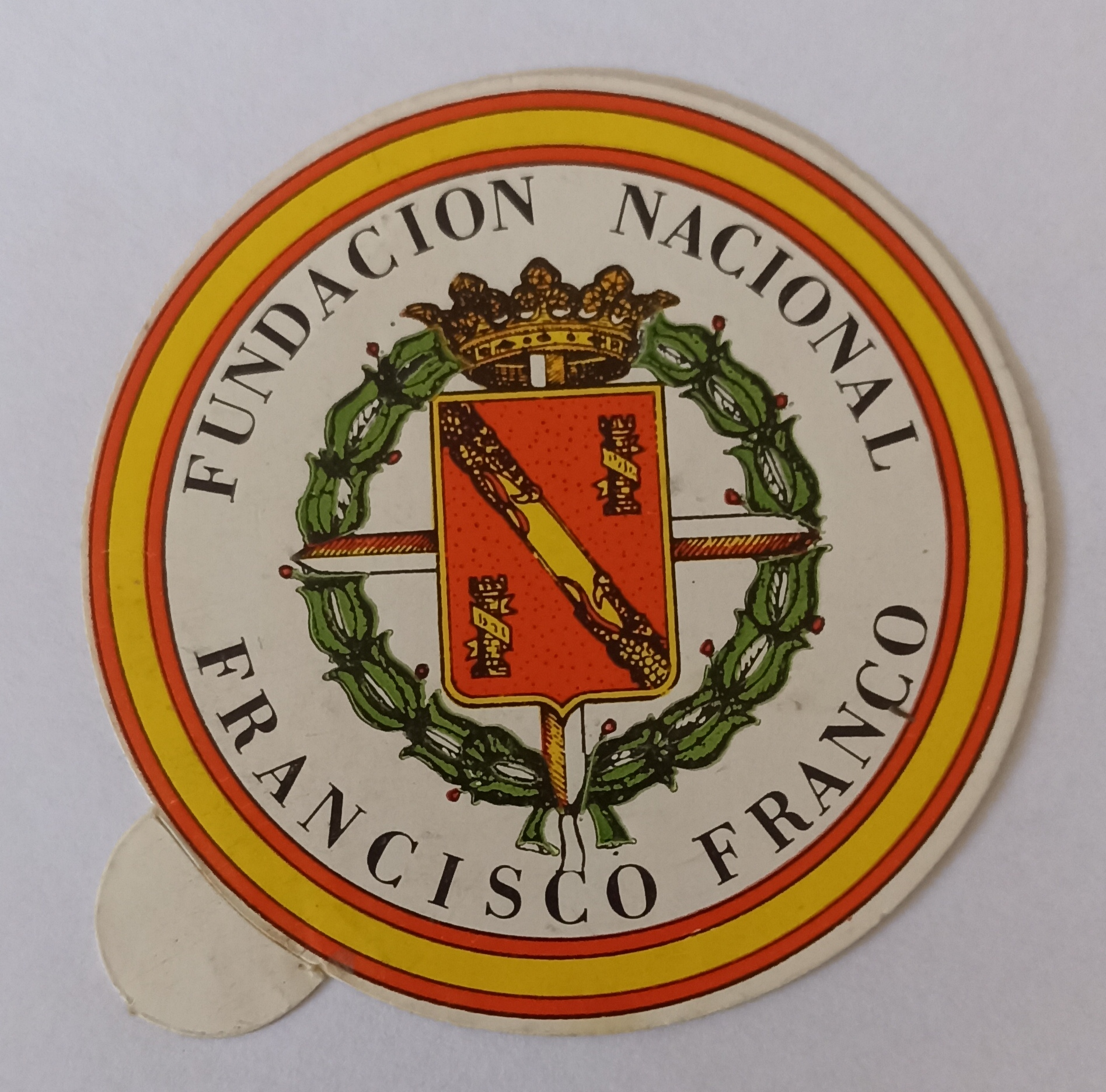
- Sticker with the logo of the Francisco Franco National Foundation
- Abbreviation: FNFF
- Named after: Francisco Franco
- Formation: 1976; 50 years ago
- Headquarters: Madrid, Spain
- Region served: Spain
- Leader: Juan Chicharro Ortega
- Honorary President: Prince Louis, Duke of Anjou
- Website: www.fnff.es

The Francisco Franco National Foundation (Spanish: Fundación Nacional Francisco Franco; FNFF) is a foundation created in 1976 devoted to promoting the legacy of the Spanish dictator Francisco Franco. The only child of Franco, Carmen Franco (1926–2017) led the organisation and later became its honorary president.

In 2017, 200,000 people signed a petition calling on the Spanish government to ban the organisation.

In 2018, after new Prime Minister Pedro Sánchez promised that Franco's remains would be removed from the Valley of the Fallen, the Foundation collected a petition with 24,000 signatures to oppose the proposal. While relatively marginal in Spanish political culture, the FNFF (and members of the Franco family) gained enormous public visibility in connection with the dictator's exhumation.

In 2024, the Spanish Ministry of Culture started proceedings to outlaw the foundation under the 2022 Democratic Memory Law.

== See also ==
- Monument to Calvo Sotelo
- Monument to Franco (Santa Cruz de Tenerife)
- Monument to Onésimo Redondo
- Monument to the Fallen (Santa Cruz de Tenerife)
- Monumento del Llano Amarillo
- Pazo de Meirás
