= Francis Franco =

Francisco Franco y Martínez-Bordiú
- Marquess of Villaverde
- Coat of arms

Marquess of Villaverde
- Tenure: 4 February 1998 – present
- Predecessor: Cristóbal Martínez-Bordiú

Lord of Meirás
- Tenure: 6 February 1989 – 21 October 2022
- Predecessor: Carmen Polo
- Born: Francisco Martínez-Bordiu y Franco; 9 December 1954 (age 71); Royal Palace of El Pardo, Spain
- Spouse: María de Suelves y Figueroa (m. 1981; div. 1992) Miriam Guisasola Carrión (m. 2001; div. 2014)
- Issue: Francisco Franco de Suelves; Juan José Franco de Suelves; Álvaro Franco y Guisasola; Miriam Franco y Guisasola
- Father: Cristóbal Martínez-Bordiú
- Mother: Carmen Franco

Francisco de Asís "Francis" Franco y Martínez-Bordiú, 11th Marquess of Villaverde (born 9 December 1954), is a Spanish aristocrat and manager of several business associations. Besides his real estate businesses, he owns many parking spaces in Madrid. He is the grandson of Spanish dictator Francisco Franco.

== Biography ==
Born in 1954 in Madrid, Francisco is the third of seven children and the eldest son of surgeon Cristóbal Martínez-Bordiú and Carmen Franco, the only child of Spanish dictator Francisco Franco and Carmen Polo. He had two older sisters, María del Carmen and María de la O, and four younger siblings, María del Mar, José Cristóbal, María de Aránzazu and Jaime Felipe.

He earned a licentiate degree in Medicine and Surgery from the Autonomous University of Madrid (UAM), although he has never practised as physician.

Following a hunting trip to Tarragona in 1977, Franco was sentenced to one and a half months in prison and was subject to the removal of his hunting license in 1978. He was again detained in 1979 during a trip to the Montes Universales in possession of a Remington but not convicted of any offence.

He was engaged for a period to television presenter Ana García Obregón.

Francisco changed the order of his surnames under orders from his grandfather in order to perpetuate his Franco lineage.

== Marriage and children ==
Francisco Martínez-Bordiú y Franco first married at Altafulla, Tarragona, on 18 December 1981, to María de Suelves y Figueroa (b. Lima, 22 August 1957), daughter of Juan José de Suelves y de Ponsich, 11th Marquess of Tamarit (Barcelona, 3 November 1928 – Madrid, 26 July 2004) and Victoria de Figueroa y Borbón (m. San Sebastián, 11 December 1930), daughter of the 2nd Count of Romanones (paternal grandfather: Álvaro, 1st Conde de Romanones; maternal great-grandfather: Enrique de Borbón, 1st Duke of Seville), and had two sons:

- Francisco Franco y de Suelves (b. Madrid, 30 November 1982).
- Juan José Franco y de Suelves (b. Madrid, 29 September 1985).

Francisco Franco y Martínez-Bordiú and María de Suelves y Figueroa divorced in 1992. Upon his father's death in 1998, Francisco Franco y Martínez-Bordiú succeeded him as 11th Marquess of Villaverde. After the 1988 death of his maternal grandmother, Carmen Polo, 1st Lady of Meirás, he succeeded her as the 2nd Lord of Meirás (together with accompanying dignity Grandee of Spain).

He married again at Móstoles in March 2001, Miriam Guisasola y Carrión (b. 1967), and had two children:

- Alvaro Franco y Guisasola (b. Madrid, 15 August 1994).
- Miriam Franco y Guisasola (b. Madrid, 5 February 1996).

The couple divorced in 2014.

Spanish nobility
Preceded by Cristóbal Martínez-Bordiú	Marquess of Villaverde; 4 February 1998 – present	Incumbent
Preceded by Carmen Polo	Lord of Meirás; 1988–2022	
