= Mingorrubio Cemetery =

Cemetery in Madrid, Spain

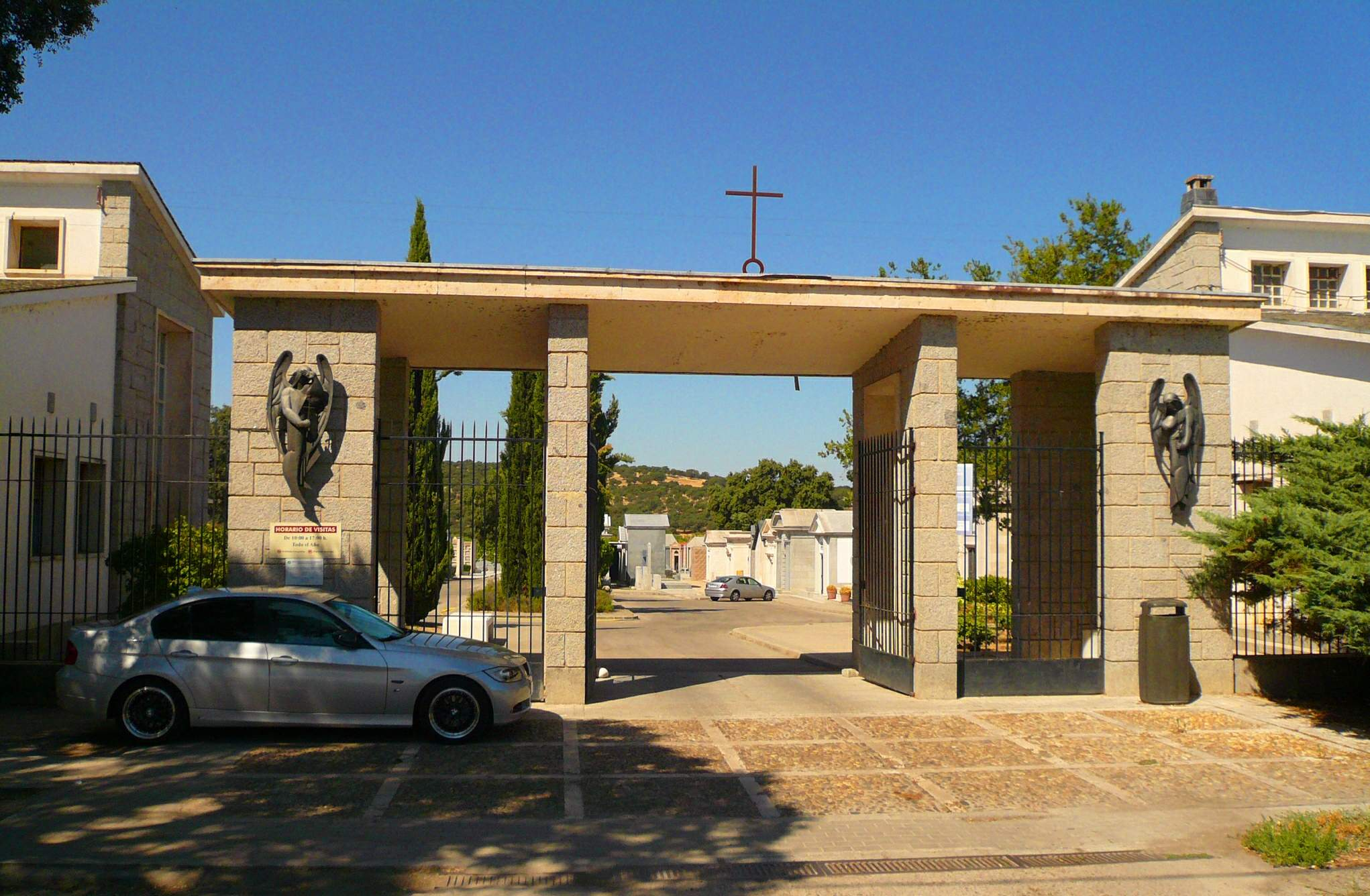
- Interactive map of Mingorrubio Cemetery

Details
- Location: Mingorrubio, Fuencarral-El Pardo, Madrid
- Country: Spain
- Coordinates: 40°32′12″N 3°47′11″W
- Type: Public

The Mingorrubio Cemetery (Spanish: Cementerio de Mingorrubio), also called the Cemetery of El Pardo (Spanish: Cementerio de El Pardo), is a municipal cemetery on the edge of Madrid, Spain. Mingorrubio is a neighborhood in the northern district of Fuencarral-El Pardo.

== Notable burials ==
- Francisco Franco (1892–1975), general and dictator, Caudillo of Spain (1936–1975), relocated from Valle de los Caídos on 24 October 2019
- Carmen Polo, 1st Lady of Meirás (1900–1988), Franco's wife, Grandee of Spain
- The 1st Marquess of Arias-Navarro (1908–1989), last Francoist Prime Minister of Spain (1973–1976)
- Luis Carrero Blanco (1904–1973), Spanish Navy admiral, Francoist Prime Minister of Spain (June–December 1973)
- Luis Gutiérrez Soto (1900–1977), architect during the Franco era
- Rafael Trujillo (1891–1961), military dictator of the Dominican Republic (1930–1961), two times President (1930–1938, 1942–1952)
- Ramfis Trujillo (1929–1969), Dominican general, son of Rafael Trujillo
