= Valley of the Fallen =

Spanish monumental memorial and Catholic basilica

Coordinates: 40°38′31″N 4°09′19″W

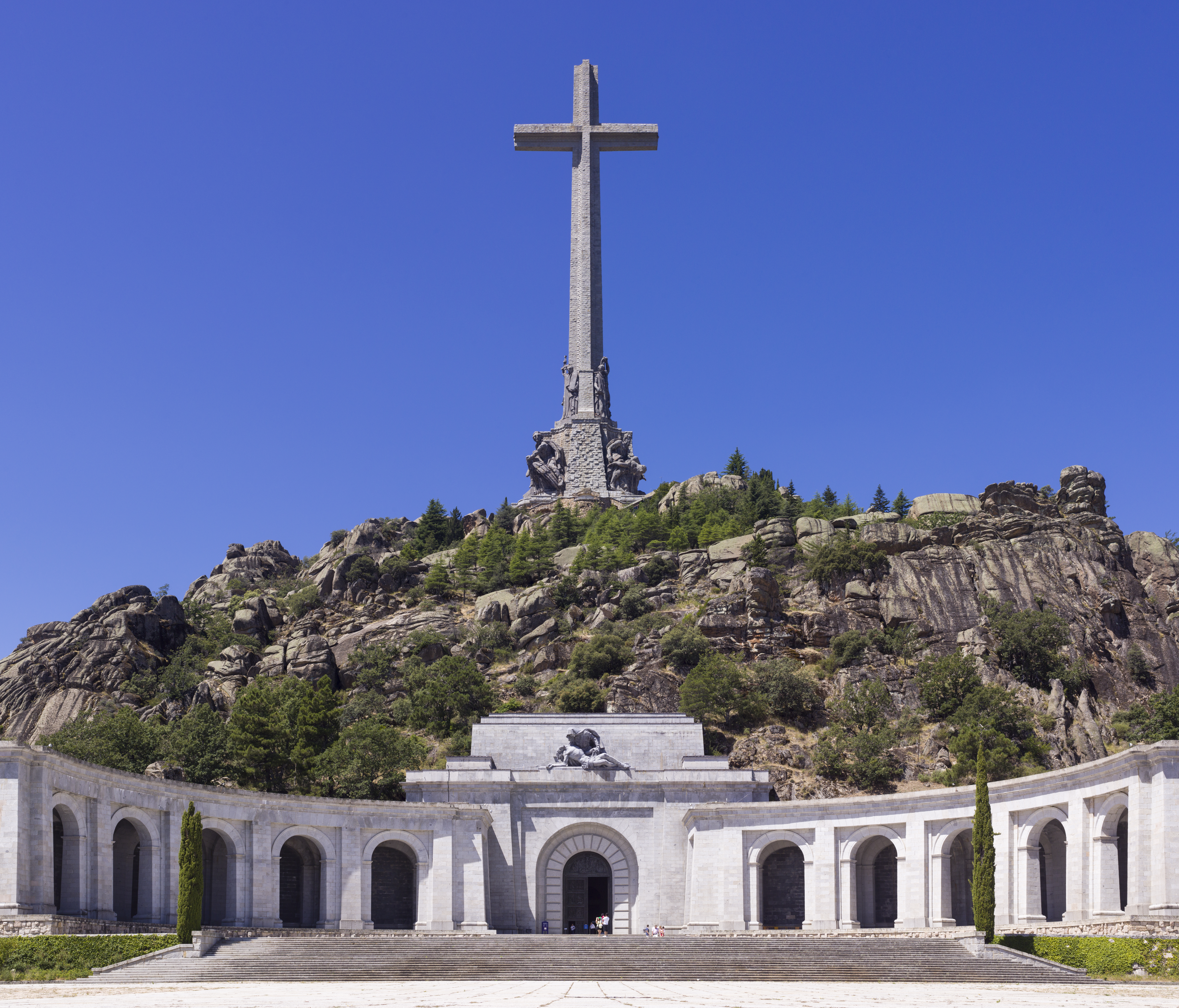
Valle de Cuelgamuros viewed from the esplanade

The Valley of the Fallen (Spanish: Valle de los Caídos) officially the Valley of Cuelgamuros (Spanish: Valle de Cuelgamuros) since 2022, is a Spanish memorial site in the Sierra de Guadarrama mountain range, dedicated to the memory of those who lost their lives during the Spanish Civil War. Overlooking the municipality of San Lorenzo de El Escorial near Madrid, the memorial was constructed by order of the Nationalist dictator Francisco Franco in 1940. Construction continued until 1958, with the site opening to the public the following year. Franco said that the monument was intended as a "national act of atonement" and reconciliation. The site served as Franco's burial place from his death in November 1975—despite it not being his intended burial site—until his exhumation on 24 October 2019, following a long and controversial legal process to remove all public glorification of his dictatorship.

The monument, considered a landmark of 20th-century Spanish architecture, was designed by Pedro Muguruza and Diego Méndez on a scale to equal, according to Franco, "the grandeur of the monuments of old, which defy time and memory". Together with the Universidad Laboral de Gijón, it is one of the most prominent examples of the Spanish Neo-Herrerian style, which was intended to form part of a revival of Juan de Herrera's architecture, exemplified by the nearby royal residence El Escorial. This uniquely Spanish architectural style was widely used for post-war public buildings and is rooted in international fascist classicism as exemplified by Albert Speer or Mussolini's Esposizione Universale Roma.

The monument precinct covers over 13.6 square kilometres (3,360 acres) of Mediterranean woodlands and granite boulders on the Sierra de Guadarrama hills, more than 900 metres (3,000 ft) above sea level and includes a basilica, a Benedictine abbey, a guest house, the Valley, and the Juanelos—four cylindrical monoliths dating from the 16th century. The most prominent feature of the monument is the towering 150-meter-high (490-foot) Christian cross, the tallest such cross in the world, erected over a granite outcrop 150 metres over the basilica esplanade and visible from over 30 kilometres (20 mi) away. Work started in 1940 and took over eighteen years to complete, with the monument being officially inaugurated on 1 April 1959. According to the official ledger, the cost of the construction totalled 1,159 million pesetas, funded through national lottery draws and donations. Some of the labourers were prisoners who traded their labour for a reduction in time served.

The complex is owned and operated by the Patrimonio Nacional, the Spanish governmental heritage agency, and has long been one of the agency's most visited attractions. Since the Spanish transition to democracy, the monument has been the subject of significant debate due to its connections to the Franco dictatorship. The monument was controversially closed to visitors in 2009 under the government of José Luis Rodríguez Zapatero. It was reopened under Mariano Rajoy's government in 2012. Since the election of Pedro Sánchez in 2018, the Spanish government has sought to redefine the monument as a "place of democratic memory". While the government failed to expel the Benedictine community resident at the complex, it announced major changes to the complex, including the addition of an interpretation center, in 2025.

== Site ==
=== Basilica, cross and abbey ===
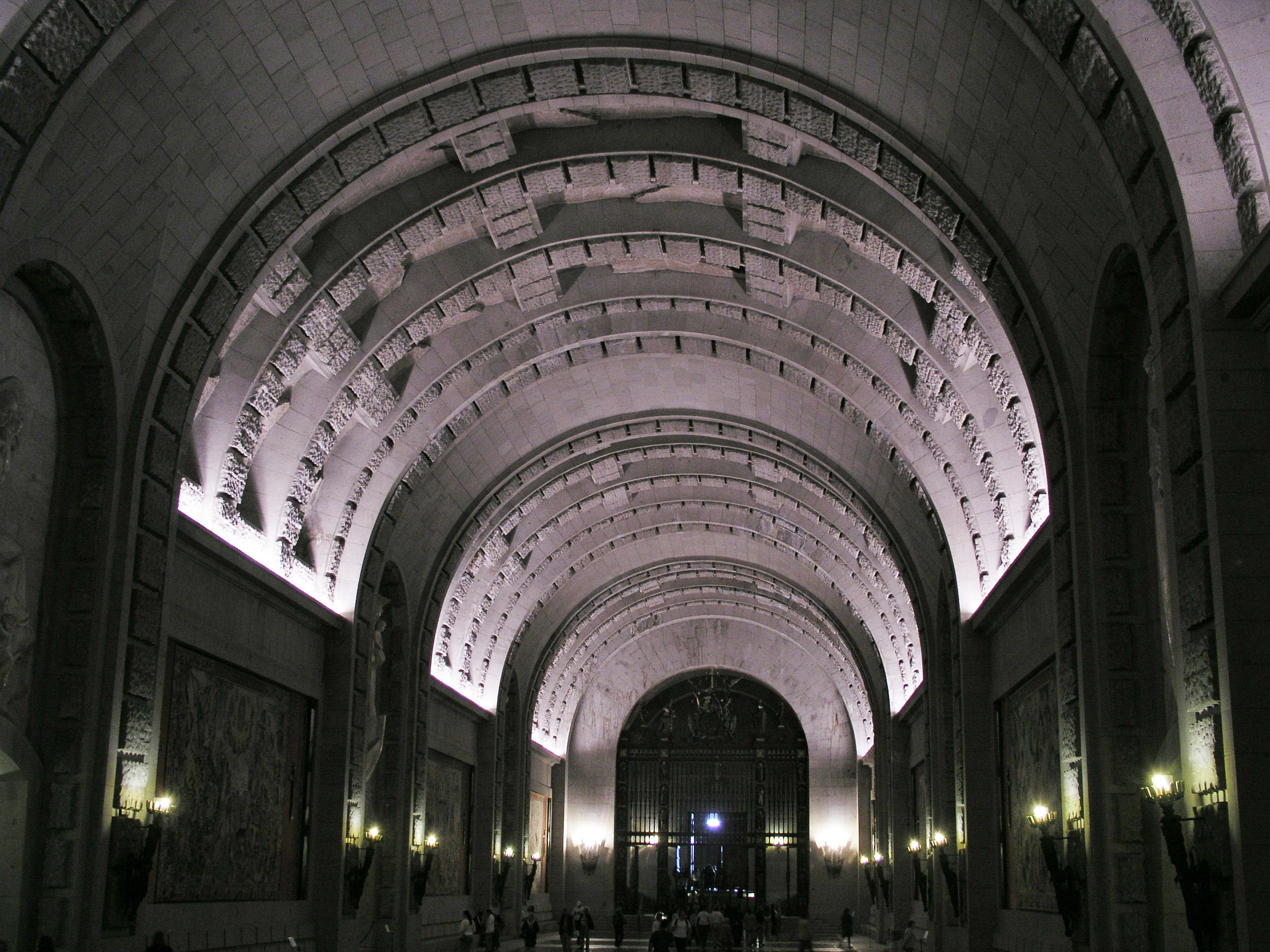
Central Nave of the Crypt

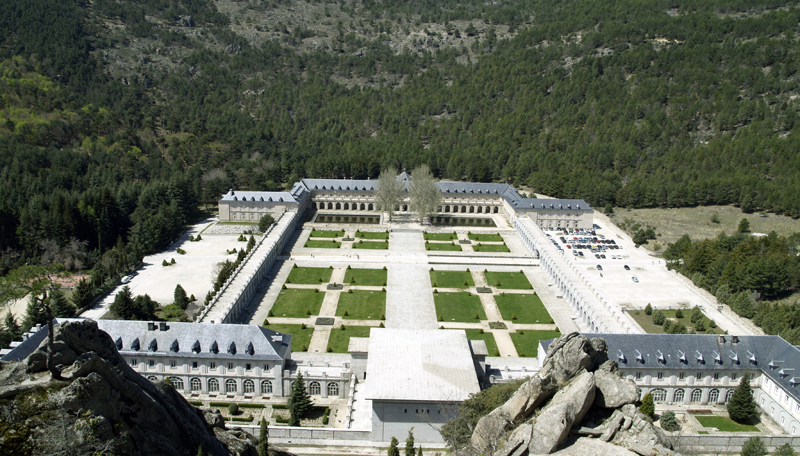
Benedictine Abbey

One of the world's largest basilicas rises above the valley along with the tallest memorial cross in the world. The Basílica de la Santa Cruz del Valle de los Caídos (Basilica of the Holy Cross of the Valley of the Fallen) is hewn out of a granite ridge. The 150-meter-high (490-foot) cross is constructed of stone. In 1960, Pope John XXIII declared the underground crypt a basilica. The dimensions of this underground basilica, as excavated, are larger than those of St. Peter's Basilica in Rome. To avoid competition with the apostle's grave church on the Vatican Hill, a partitioning wall was built near the inside of the entrance and a sizeable entryway was left unconsecrated. The memorial sculptures to the fallen at the basilica are works by Spanish sculptor Luis Sanguino.

The monumental sculptures over the main gate and the base of the cross culminated the career of Juan de Ávalos. The monument consists of a wide explanada (esplanade) with views of the valley and the outskirts of Madrid in the distance. A long vaulted crypt was tunnelled out of solid granite, piercing the mountain to the massive transept, which lies exactly below the cross.

Coat of arms of the Abbey

On the wrought-iron gates, Franco's neo-Habsburg double-headed eagle is prominently displayed. On entering the basilica, visitors are flanked by two large metal statues of art deco angels holding swords. There is a funicular that connects the basilica with the base of the cross. There is a spiral staircase and a lift inside the cross, connecting the top of the basilica dome to a trapdoor on top of the cross, but their use is restricted to maintenance staff. The Benedictine Abbey of the Holy Cross of the Valley of the Fallen (Spanish: Abadía Benedictina de la Santa Cruz del Valle de los Caídos), on the other side of the mountain, houses priests who say perpetual Masses for the repose of the fallen of the Spanish Civil War and later wars and peacekeeping missions fought by the Spanish Army. The abbey ranks as a Royal Monastery.

=== Valley of Cuelgamuros ===
The valley that contains the monument, preserved as a national park, is located 10 km northeast of the royal site of El Escorial, northwest of Madrid. Beneath the valley floor lie the remains of 40,000 people, whose names are accounted for in the monument's register. The valley contains both Nationalist and Republican graves, but the dedication written in stone reads Caídos por Dios y por España (Fallen for God and for Spain, which is criticized because it was the Francoist Spain motto) and numerous symbols of the Francoist regime. Moreover, Republicans were interred here mostly without the consent or even the knowledge of their families; some estimates claim that there are 33,800 victims of Francoism interred — and their families have legal problems in recovering the remains of their family members. Franco was exhumed and removed from the church in 2019 as an effort to discourage public veneration of the site.

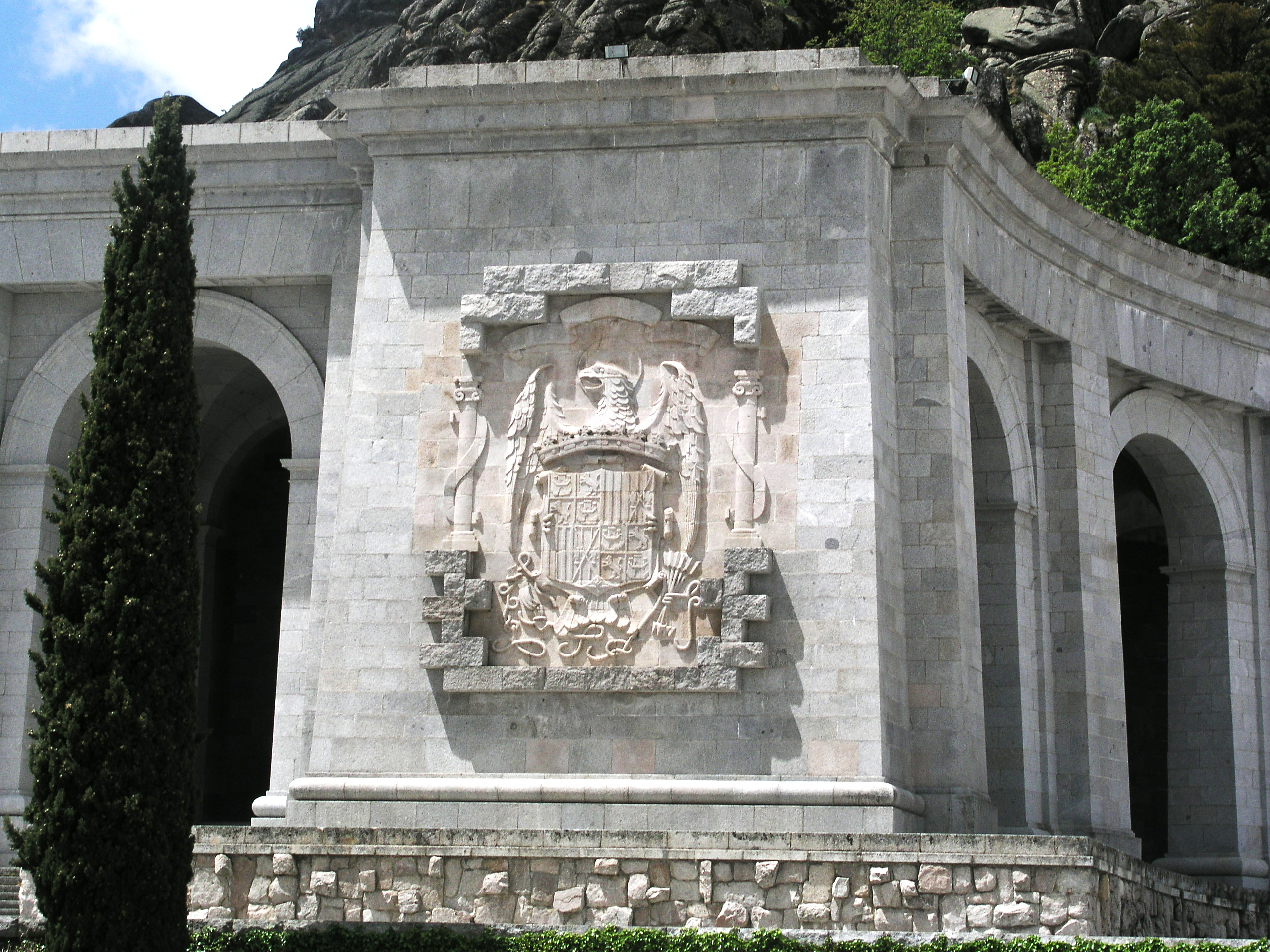
One of the two shields of the Catholic Monarchs, on the façade

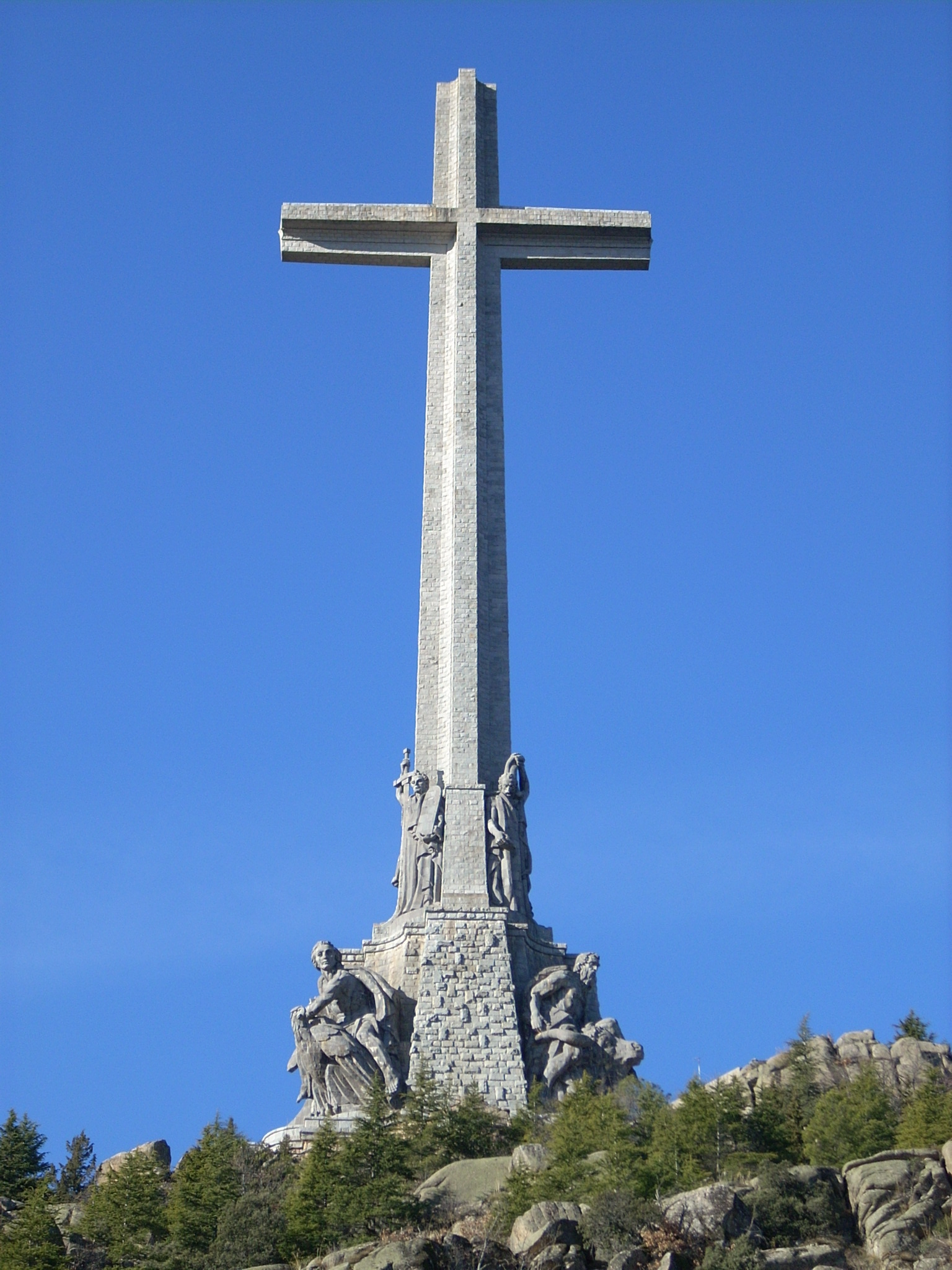
The cross

The evangelists
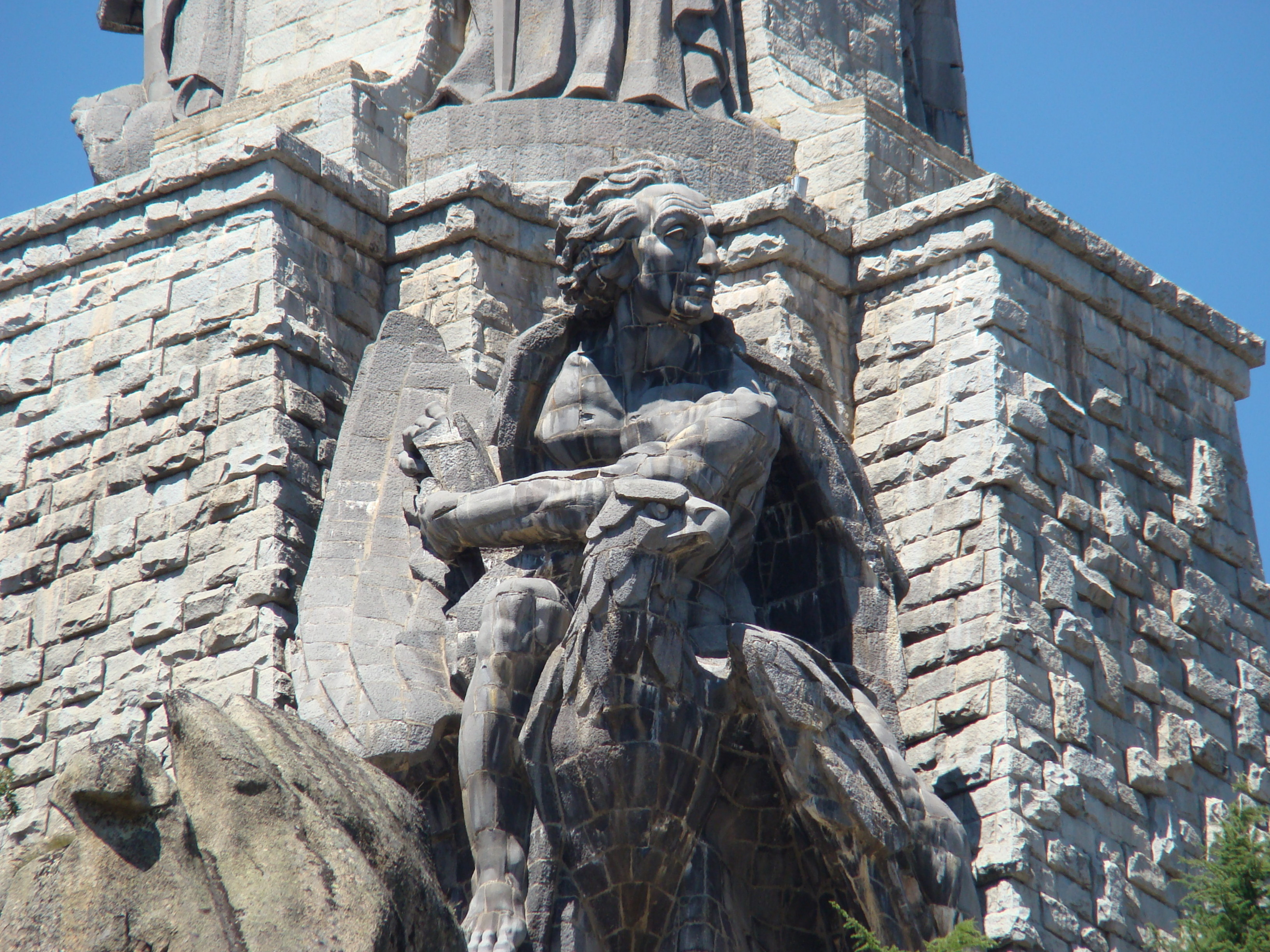
St John

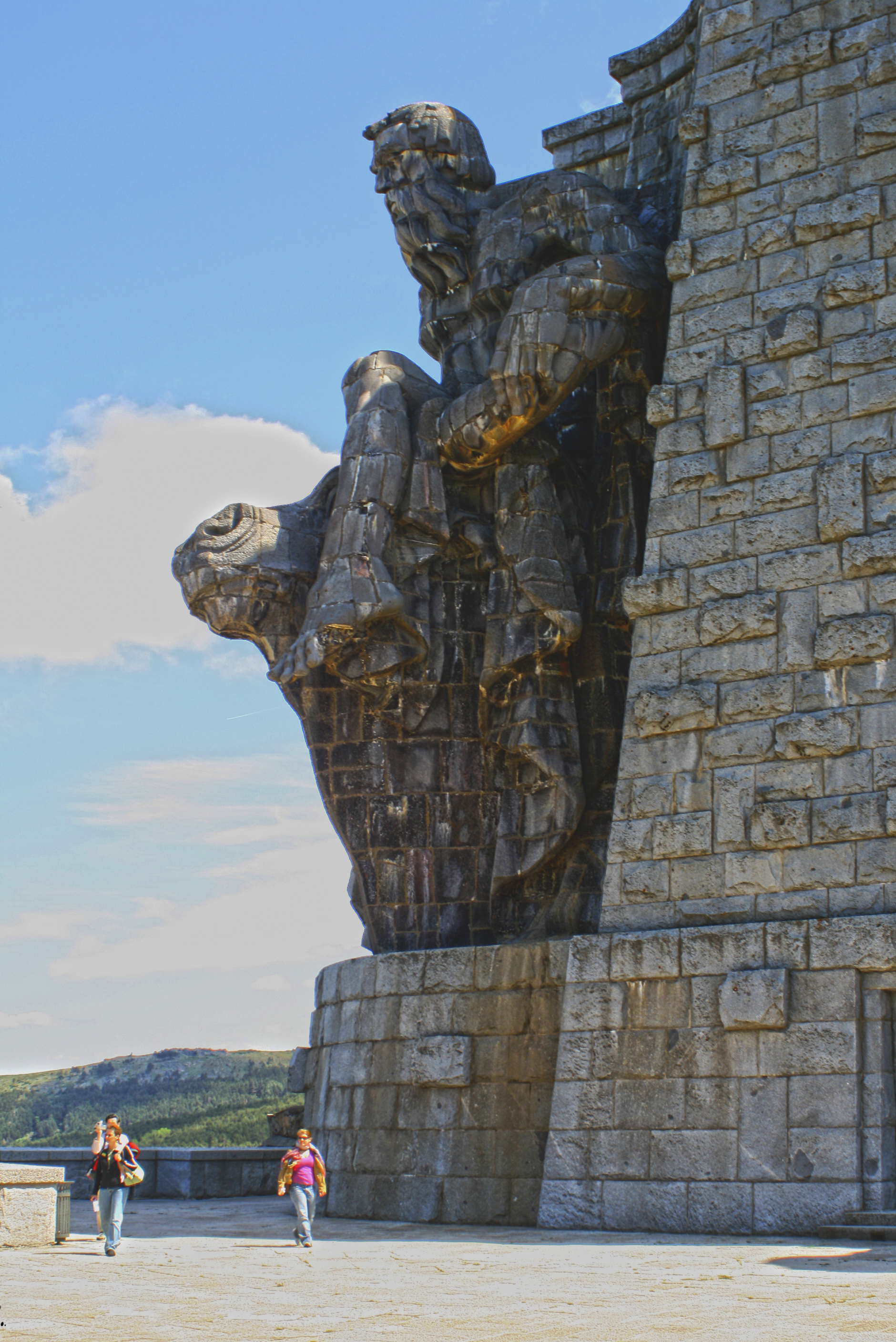
St Luke

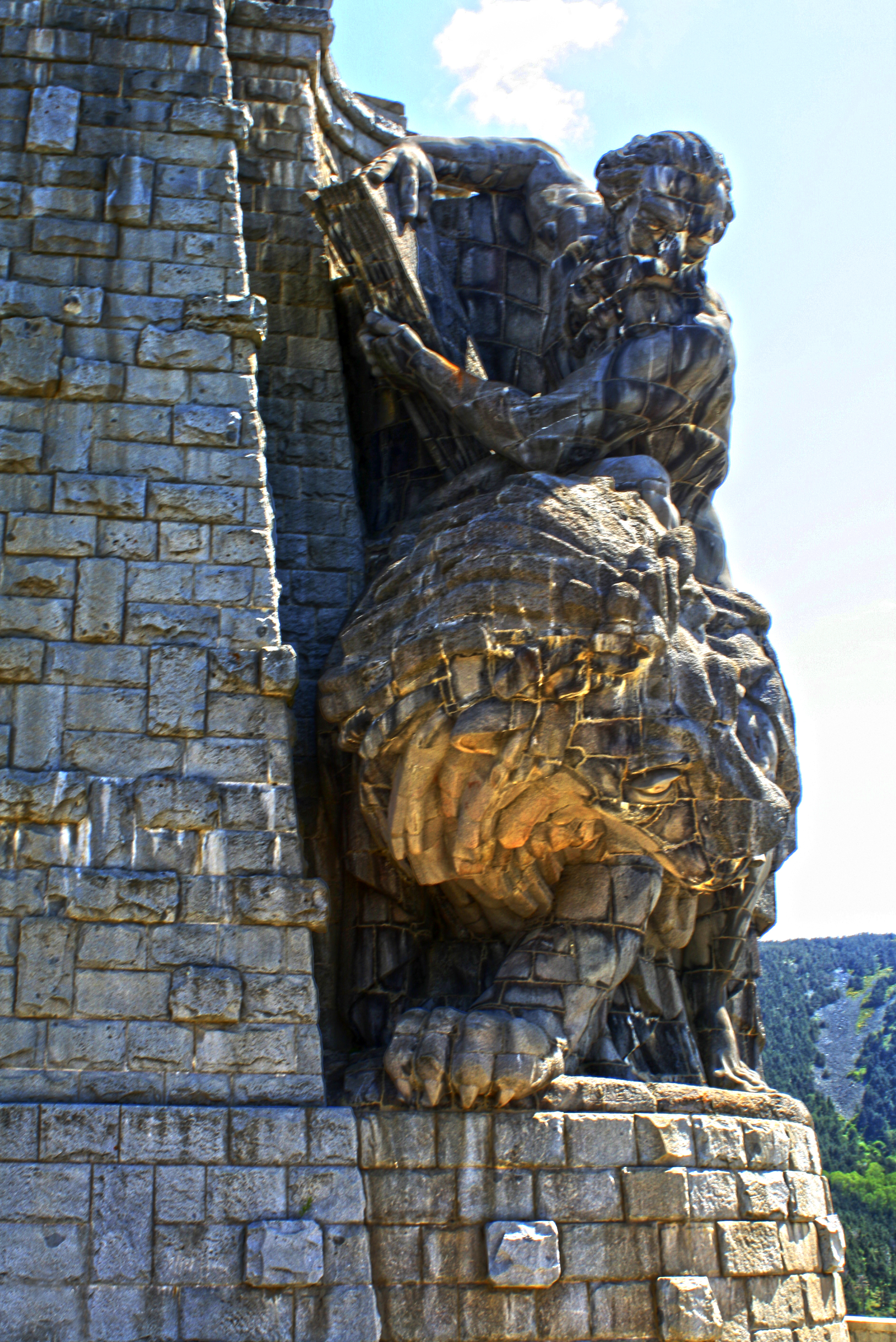
St Mark

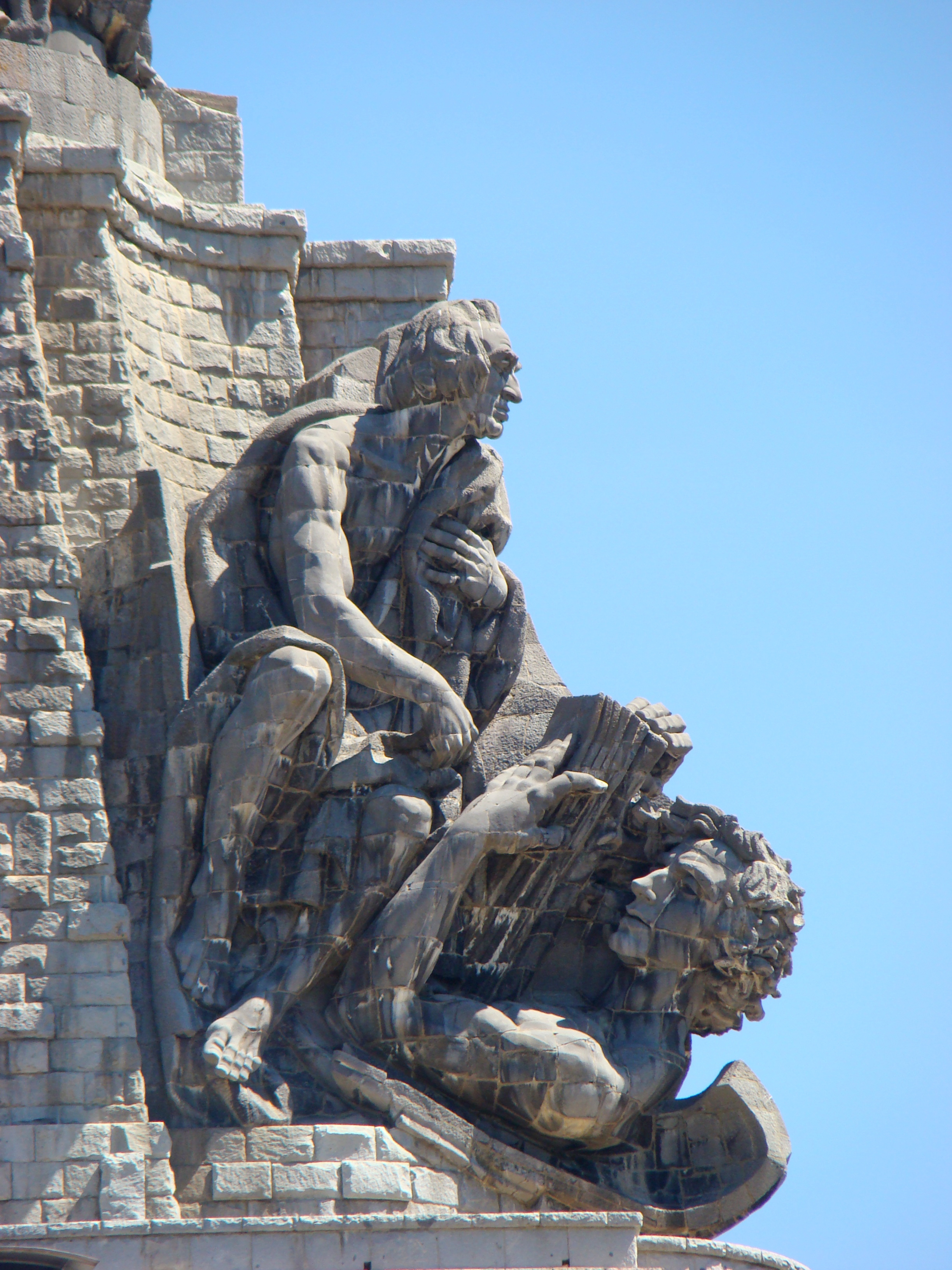
St Matthew
The Cardinal Virtues
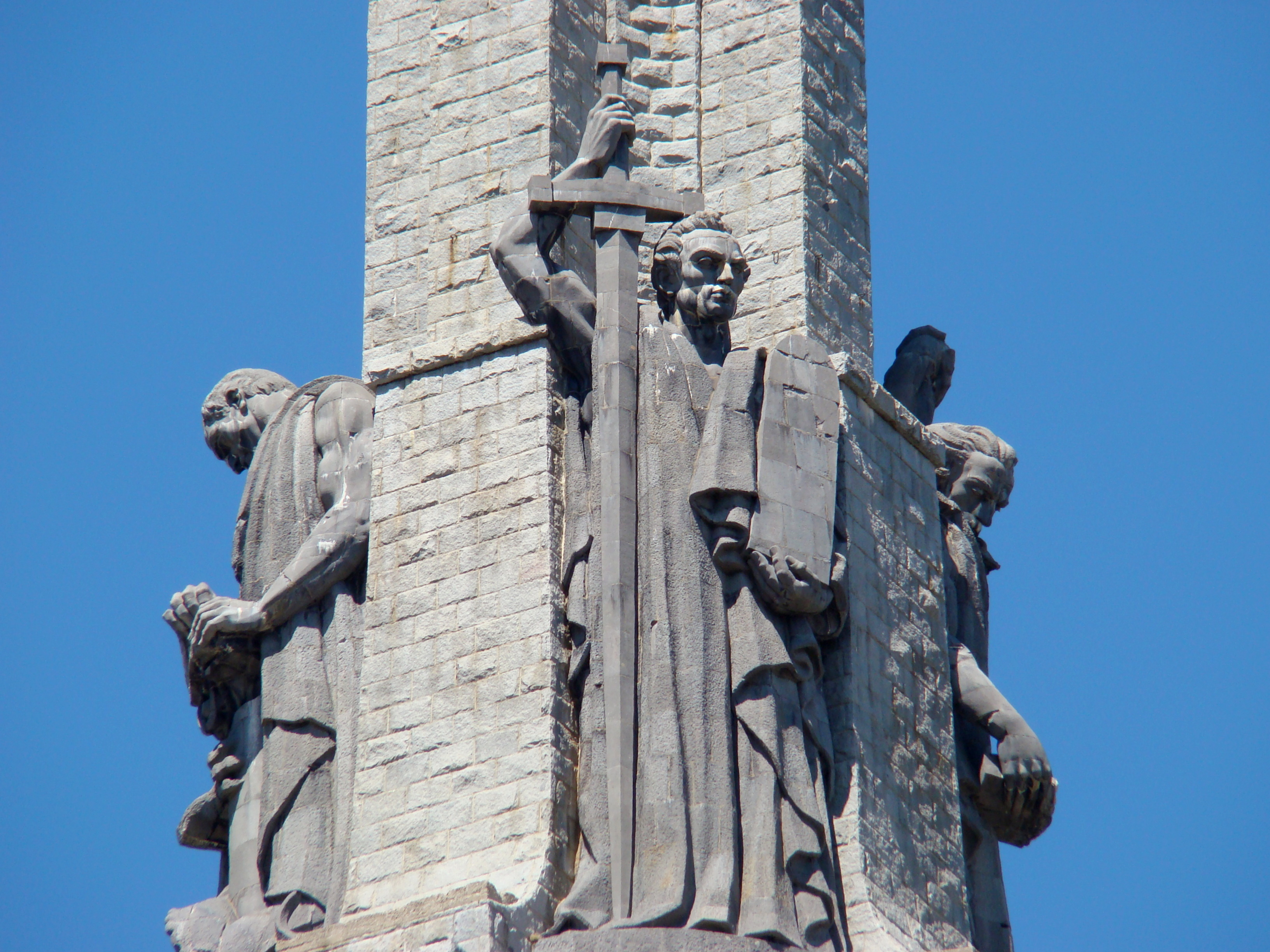
Courage and Justice

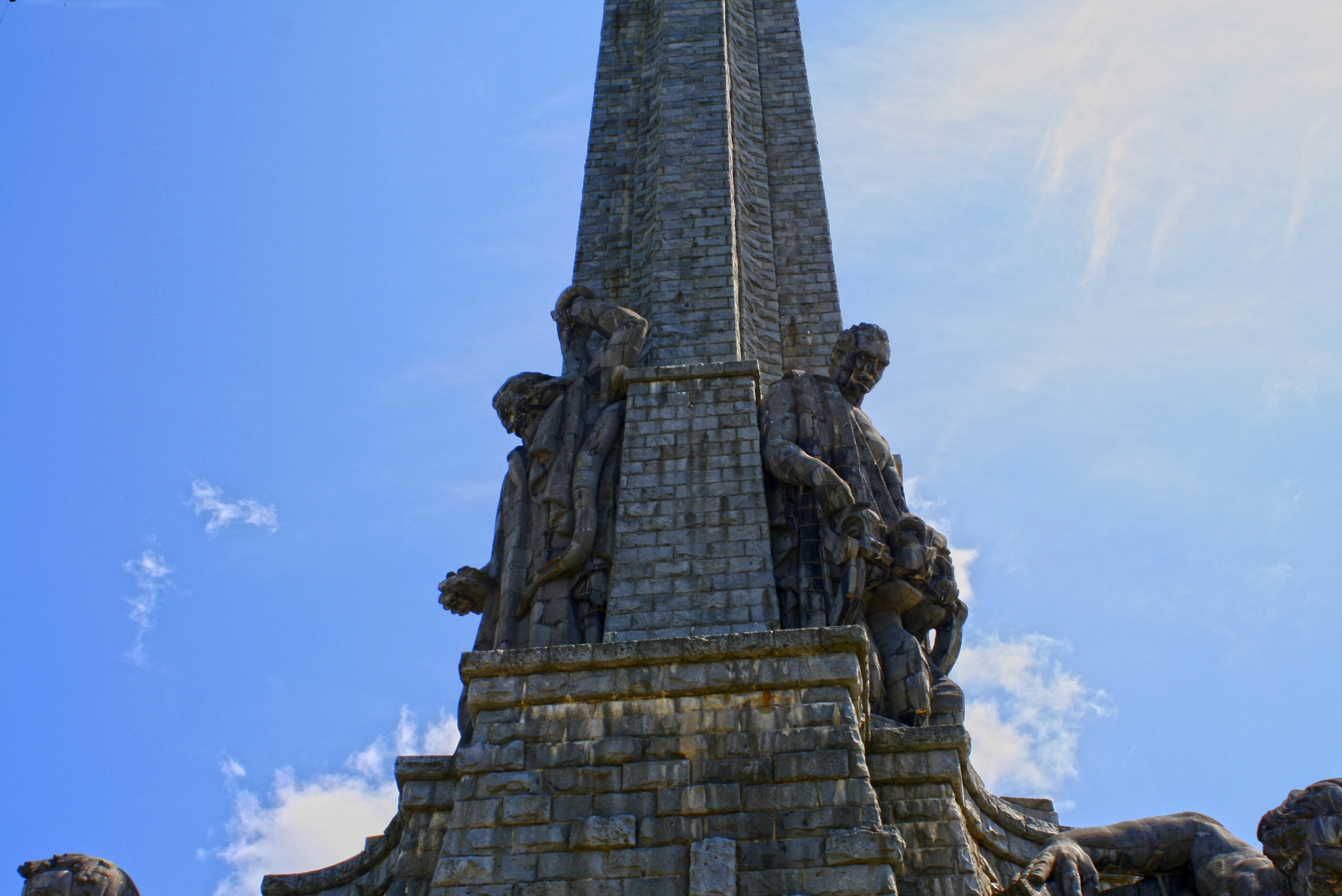
Prudence and Temperance

== History ==
=== Franco's tomb (1975–2019) ===
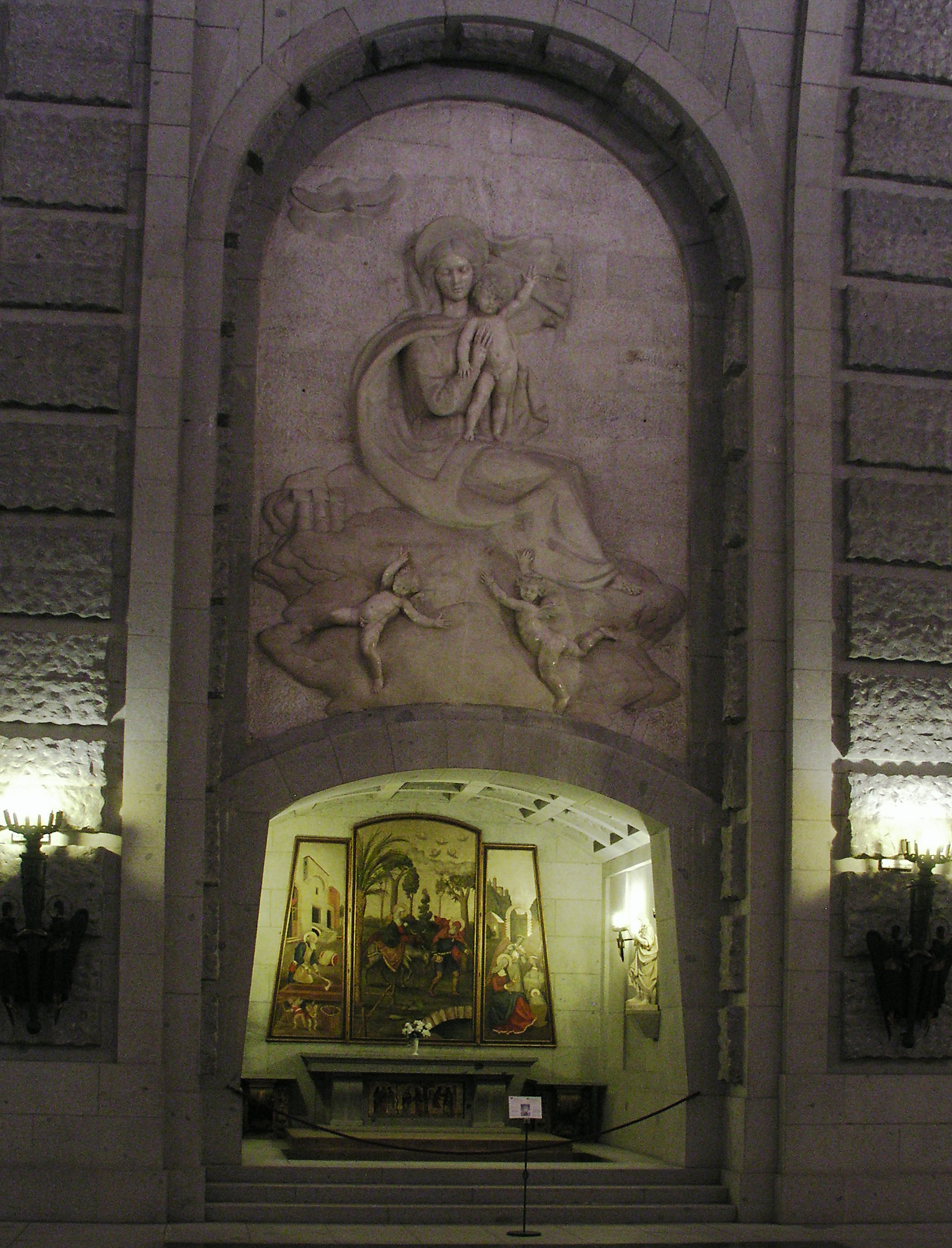
Virgen de Loreto

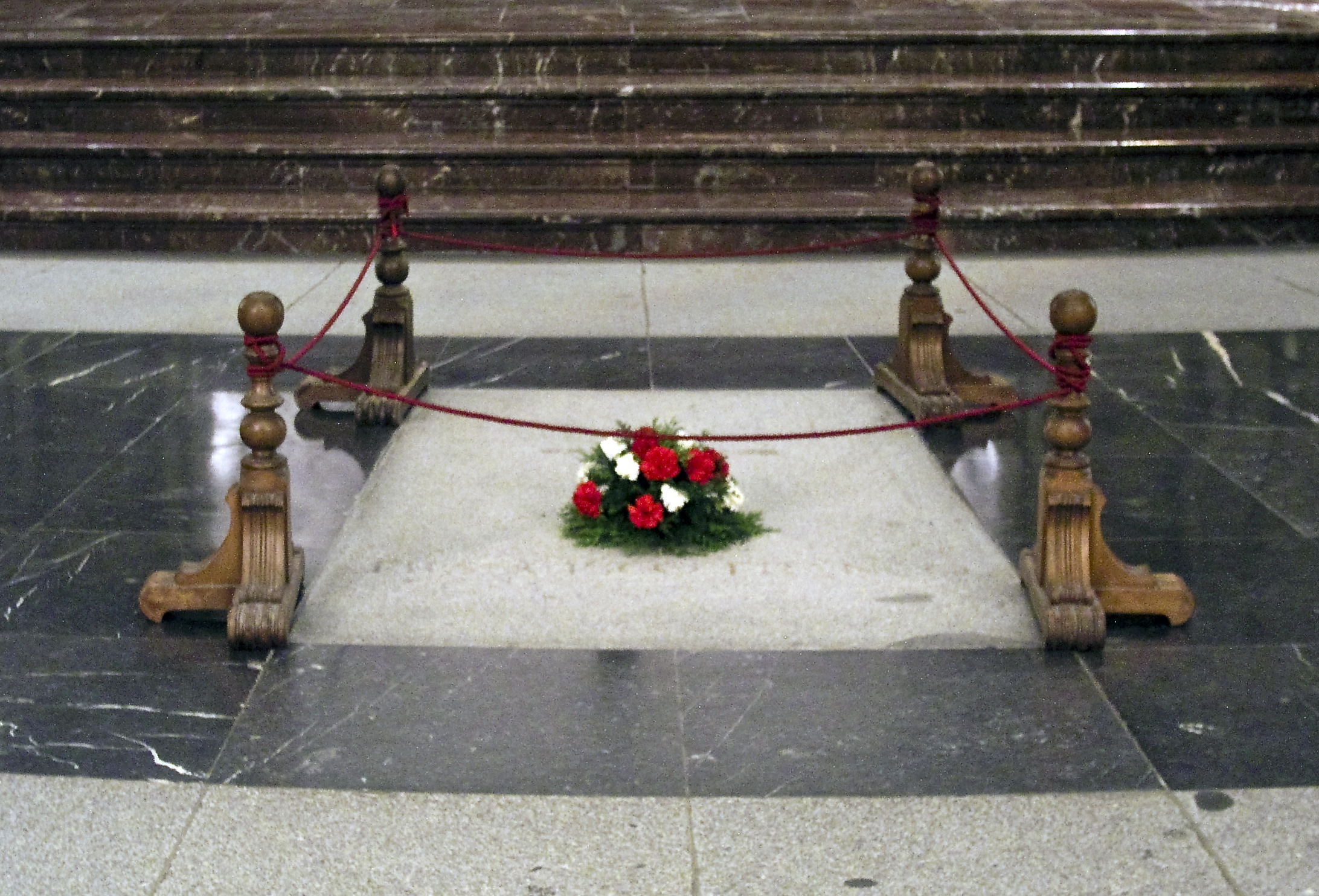
Franco's tomb (1975–2019)

After the dictator's death, the interim Government led by Prince Juan Carlos and Prime Minister Carlos Arias Navarro designated the site in 1975 as his burial place. Franco's family, when asked if they had any opinion on where he should be buried, said they had none. According to a friend and colleague of Arias, the decision to bury Franco in the Valley was not made by Franco or his family, but probably by the king. The family agreed to the interim Government's request to bury him in the Valley, and has stood by the decision. Before his death, nobody had expected that Franco would be buried in the Valley. Moreover, the grave had to be excavated and prepared within two days, forcing last minute changes in the plumbing system of the Basilica. Unlike the fallen of the Civil War who were laid to rest in tombs behind the chapels on the sides of the basilica, Franco was buried behind the main altar, in the central nave. His grave is marked by a tombstone engraved with just his given name and first surname, on the choir side of the main high altar (between the altar and the apse of the Church; behind the altar, from the perspective of a person standing at the main door). Franco is the only person interred in the Valley who did not die in the Civil War. The argument given by the defenders of his tomb is that in the Catholic Church the developer of a church can be buried in the church that he has promoted, therefore Franco would be in the Valley as the promoter of the basilica's construction.

Franco said about the monument "Mi verdadero monumento no es aquella Cruz del Valle [de los Caídos], sino la clase media española. Cuando asumí el Gobierno no existía. La lego a la España del mañana" "My true monument is not that Cross in the Valley [of the Fallen], but the Spanish middle class. When I took office, it didn't exist. I bequeath it to the Spain of tomorrow."

Franco was the second person interred in the Santa Cruz basilica. Franco had earlier interred José Antonio Primo de Rivera, the founder of the Falange movement, who was executed by the Republican government in 1936 and was buried by the Francoist government under a modest gravestone on the nave side of the altar. Primo de Rivera died on 20 November 1936, exactly 39 years before Franco. His grave is in the corresponding position on the other side of the altar. Accordingly, 20 November is annually commemorated by large crowds of Franco supporters and various Falange successor movements and individuals, flocking to the Requiem Masses held for the repose of the souls of their political leaders.

==== Exhumation and removal of Franco's remains ====
On 29 November 2011 the Expert Commission for the Future of the Valley of the Fallen, formed by the Spanish Socialist Workers' Party (PSOE) government of José Luis Rodríguez Zapatero on 27 May 2011 under the Historical Memory Law and charged to give advice for converting the Valley to a "memory centre that dignifies and rehabilitates the victims of the Civil War and the subsequent Franco regime," rendered a report recommending as its principal proposal for the commission's stated end the removal of the remains of Franco from the Valley for reburial at a location to be chosen by his family, but only after first obtaining a broad parliamentary consensus for such action. The Commission based its decision upon Franco having not died in the Civil War and the aim of the Commission that the Valley be exclusively for those on both sides who had died in the Civil War. In regard to Primo de Rivera, the Commission recommended that since he was a victim of the Civil War, his remains should stay at the Valley but relocated within the Basilica mausoleum on equal footing with those remains of others who died in the conflict. The Commission further conditioned its recommendation for the removal of the remains of Franco from the Valley and the relocation of the remains of Primo de Rivera within the Basilica mausoleum upon the consent of the Catholic Church since "any action inside of the Basilica requires the permission of the Church." Three members of the twelve person commission gave a joint dissenting opinion opposing the recommendation for the removal of the remains of Franco from the Valley claiming such action would only further "divide and stress Spanish society." The Commission additionally proposed for its report creating a "meditation centre" in the Valley for those not of the Catholic faith, the names shown on the esplanade that leads into the Basilica mausoleum of all Civil War victims buried at the Valley who can be identified and an "interpretive centre" be built to explain how and why the Valley exists. The total cost of the proposed changes to the Valley was estimated by the Commission at €13 million. On 20 November, nine days before the issuance of the report of the commission and ironically on the 36th anniversary of the death of Franco, the conservative Popular Party (PP) won for the 2011 general election absolute majorities in both Spain's lower house, the Congress of Deputies and Senate.

On 15 March 2019, the government of Pedro Sanchez announced that Franco would be exhumed and reburied at Mingorrubio Cemetery in El Pardo with his wife Carmen Polo, and that the exhumation would take place on 10 June 2019, assuming the Supreme Court did not issue a precautionary order preventing the exhumation until a decision for those appeals of the Franco family and Benedictine Community presently before it. On 19 March 2019, the Francisco Franco National Foundation filed an appeal with the Supreme Court contending the February agreement of the Council of Ministers for the exhumation is "null and void" for violating "openly" not only the Constitution, but as well the royal decree that modifies the law of Historical Memory and "all the regulations that make up the legal regime," in addition to European laws and regulations. The Franco Foundation further prayed the Supreme Court stay any action to remove the remains of Franco during the pendency of its appeal. On 4 June 2019 the five magistrates of the Fourth Administrative Contentious Division of the Supreme Court unanimously suspended the exhumation pending a final decision for those appeals in opposition to the exhumation filed by the Franco Family, the Benedictine Community, the Franco Foundation and the Association for the Defense of the Valley of the Fallen.

On 24 September 2019 the Supreme Court unanimously ruled in favour of exhumation and rejected the arguments put forward by Franco's family. It was reported that the exhumation could take place before 10 November 2019 Spanish election and would inter Franco's remains in the El Pardo Cemetery. On 24 October 2019, in the presence of Franco's relatives and Dolores Delgado, Spain's Minister of Justice, the coffin containing Franco's remains was exhumed from the basilica in the Valley of the Fallen. The coffin was carried out into the plaza by members of the dictator's family, who exclaimed: ′¡Viva España! ¡Viva Franco!′ (′Long live Spain! Long live Franco!′) as they lowered it into a hearse. It was then secured in a waiting helicopter, which transported it to the Mingorrubio-El Pardo municipal cemetery, where Franco was reburied alongside his wife, Carmen Polo. The Franco family chose Ramón Tejero, an Andalucían parish priest, and son of the Guardia Civil lieutenant colonel Antonio Tejero, who violently stormed the Spanish Parliament during the unsuccessful military coup on 23 February 1981, to say Holy Mass at the reinterment ceremony.

=== Closure (2009-2012) ===
In November 2009, Patrimonio Nacional controversially ordered the closure of the basilica for an indefinite period of time, alleging preservation issues also affecting the Cross and some sculptures. These allegations were contested by some experts and by the Benedictine Order religious community that lives at the complex, and were seen by some conservative opinion groups as a policy of harassment against the monument. In 2010, the Pietà sculpture group started to be "dismantled" with hammers and heavy machinery, which the Juan de Ávalos trust feared could cause irreparable damage to the sculpture. As a result, thereof, the trust filed several lawsuits against the Spanish government. At the time, several parallels were made by conservative and liberal groups between the dismantling of the Pietà under the PSOE government and the destruction of the Buddhas of Bamyan by the Taliban.

=== Reopening (2012-present) ===
Following the 2011 Spanish general election, on 1 June 2012 the conservative PP government of Mariano Rajoy reopened the monument to the public with the exception only of the base of the cross, in the past accessible by cable car or on foot, which will remain closed to ascent while the sculptures of the four apostles and the cardinal virtues forming part of the base of the cross are presently under engineering review and restoration for cracks and other deterioration. Before the official reopening on 1 June 2012, access for the public to the basilic was already possible in 2011. Beginning on 1 June 2012 the charge for entry to the monument has been €5. The €5 entry fee was anticipated to generate around €2 million per year if the Valley of the Fallen once again attracted 500,000 visitors annually, the approximate number of annual visitors before closure of the monument in 2009 by the PSOE government. Starting on 2 May 2013, and over the strong objection of the Association for the Defense of the Valley of the Fallen, the entry fee for the monument was increased from €5 to €9. Prior to its closure in 2009, the Valley of the Fallen was the third most visited site of the Patrimonio Nacional after only the Royal Palace of Madrid and El Escorial. For the accommodation of visitors a cafeteria restaurant located in the cable car building of the monument has been re-opened. The Valley of the Fallen attracted 254,059 visitors in 2015, 262,860 visitors in 2016 and 283,263 visitors in 2017. There were 378,875 visitors in 2018 to the Valley of the Fallen and 318,248 visitors in 2019.

== Reception ==
=== Support ===
The memorial's existence is generally supported by conservative and Catholic groups, including The European Conservative. Several attempts to alter the memorial have been strongly opposed by Louis Alphonse de Bourbon, current head of the House of Bourbon, in Spanish legal courts.

In 2003, Fr. Robert Prevost participated in an Augustinian event at the site, to pray for peace and reconciliation among Spaniards.

=== Criticism ===
Presenting the monument in a politically neutral way poses a number of problems, not least of which is the strength of opposing opinions on the issue. The Times quoted Jaume Bosch, a Catalan politician and former MP seeking to change the monument, as saying: "I want what was in reality something like a Nazi concentration camp to stop being a nostalgic place of pilgrimage for Francoists. Inevitably, whether we like it or not, it's part of our history. We don't want to pull it down, but the Government has agreed to study our plan."

The charge that the monument site was "like a Nazi concentration camp" refers to the use of convict labour, including Republican prisoners, who traded their labour for a reduction in time served. Although Spanish law prohibited the use of slave labour at the time, it did provide for convicts to choose voluntary work on the basis of redeeming two days of conviction for each day worked. This law remained in force until 1995. This benefit was increased to six days when labour was carried out at the basilica with a salary of 7 pesetas per day, a regular worker's salary at the time, with the possibility that the family of the convict would benefit from the housing and Catholic children's schools that were built in the valley for them by the other workers. Only convicts with a record of good behaviour would qualify for this redemption scheme, because the work site was considered to be a low security environment. The motto used by the Nationalist government was "el trabajo ennoblece" ("work ennobles").

It is claimed that by 1943 the number of prisoners who were working at the site reached close to six hundred. It is also claimed that up to 20,000 prisoners were used for the overall construction of the monument and that forced labour was used. According to the official programme records, 2,643 workers directly participated in the construction, and some of them were highly skilled, as was required by the complexity of the work. 243 of these were convicts. During the eighteen-year construction period, the official tally of workers who died as a result of accidents totalled fourteen.

The socialist Spanish government of 2004–2011 instituted a statewide policy of removal of Francoist symbols from public buildings and spaces, leading to an uneasy relationship with a monument that is the most conspicuous legacy of Franco's rule. Political rallies in celebration of Franco are now banned by the Historical Memory Law, voted on by the Congress of Deputies on 16 October 2007. This law dictated that "the management organisation of the Valley of the Fallen should aim to honour the memory of all of those who died during the civil war and who suffered repression". It has been suggested that the Valley of the Fallen be re-designated as a "monument to Democracy" or as a memorial to all Spaniards killed in conflict "for Democracy". Some organisations, among them centrist Catholic groups, question the purpose of these plans, on the basis that the monument is already dedicated to all of the dead, civilian and military of both Nationalist and Republican sides. The Democratic Memory Law of October 2022 envisaged the future of the Valley of the Fallen as a civil cemetery. As Primo de Rivera had required a Catholic burial, his family arranged for his body be exhumed from the Valley in April 2023 and reburied in Saint Isidore Cemetery in Madrid.

== In popular culture ==
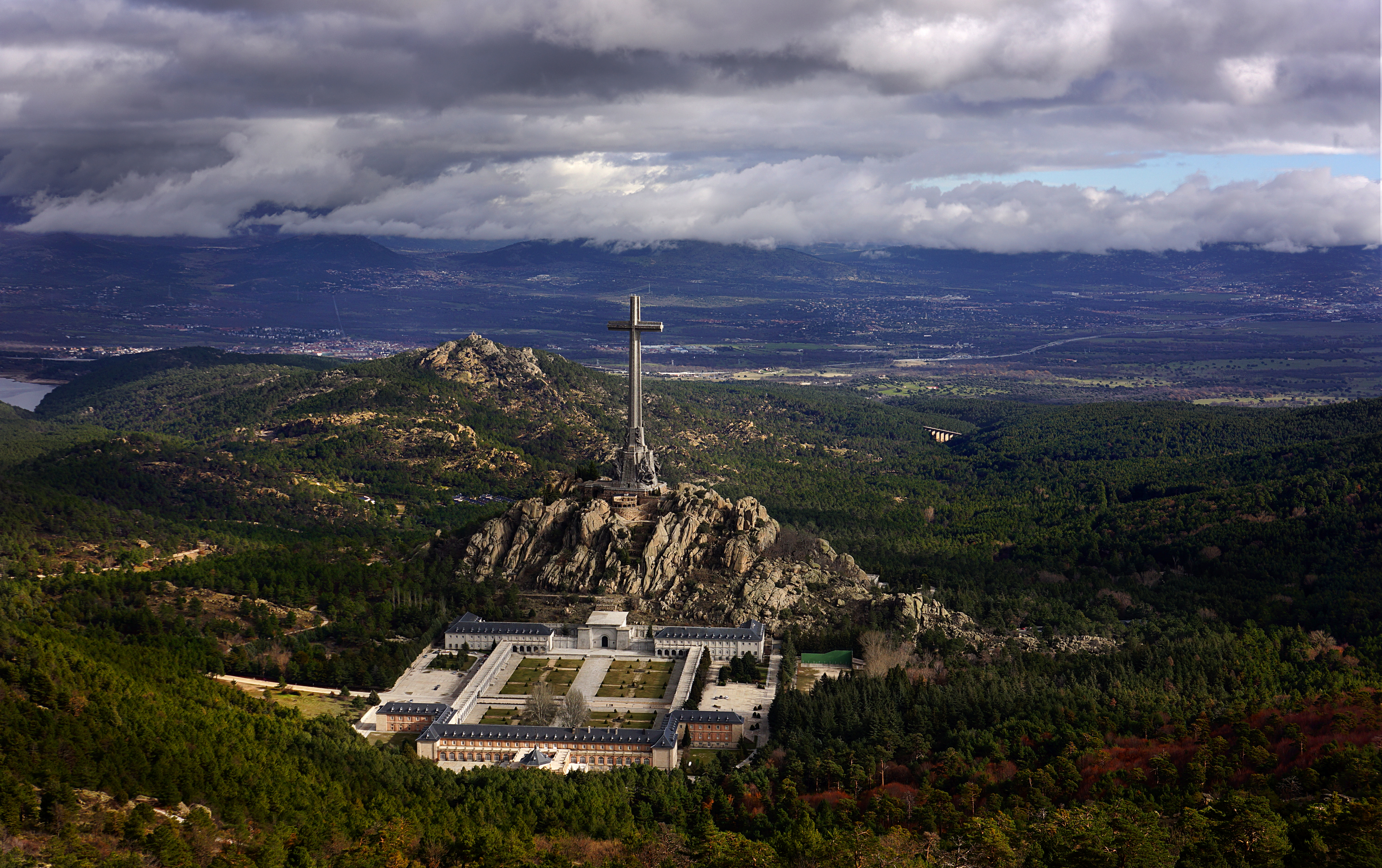
General view of the monument

The Valle de Cuelgamuros (with its former name Valle de los Caídos) appears in Richard Morgan's 2002 novel Altered Carbon, where it is being used as a base of operations for one of the major antagonists, Reileen Kawahara. It also appears in the 2010 Spanish dark comedy film The Last Circus (Spanish: Balada triste de trompeta), as a visual homage to the climactic Mount Rushmore scene in the Hitchcock classic North by Northwest.

Graham Greene's 1982 novel Monsignor Quixote uses a visit to the Valle to illustrate the competing political and social attitudes to Franco's reign and the status of his tomb in modern Spain. There is also a large reference to this monument and the labourers who built it in Victoria Hislop's book The Return. In 2013, Spain saw the release of the film All'Ombra Della Croce (Spanish: A la Sombra de la Cruz, "In the Shadow of the Cross") directed by the Italian filmmaker Alessandro Pugno. The film tells the secret story of the children of the chorus who sing every day in the mass. They live in a boarding school inside the monument and receive a traditional education. The film was awarded with the first prize for the best documentary at Festival de Málaga de Cine Español.

In the 2016 film The Queen of Spain, actor Antonio Resines plays Blas Fontiverosa, a film director who returns to Spain after fleeing following the Civil War and is captured and forced to work on the construction of the Valley. Also in 2016, Mayor of Madrid Manuela Carmena, proposed to change the site's name from "El Valle de los Caídos" to "El Valle de la Paz" (The Valley of Peace).

The monument's construction and significance is paralleled with that of El Escorial in Carlos Fuentes's 1975 novel Terra Nostra. The monument's name is the title of a 1978 novel by the Spanish author Carlos Rojas Vila. Part of the novel's plot is set in the late days of the Francoist Spain. The monument appears in Dan Brown's 2017 novel Origin. The monument is referenced in Ruta Sepetys's 2019 novel Fountains of Silence. The monument appears in Edwin Torres's 1975 novel Carlito's Way in a scene where the protagonist, Carlito Brigante, is setting up an informant for a hit.

== See also ==
- Fascism in Spain
- Burial of Ferdinand Marcos
- Imperial Route of the Community of Madrid
