= Carmen Polo =

Spouse of Francisco Franco (1900–1988)

The Most Excellent Carmen Polo Grandee
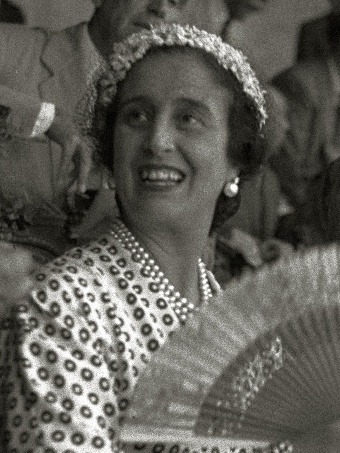
- Picture taken in 1950

Lady of Meirás 26 November 1975 – 6 February 1988

Personal details
- Born: María del Carmen Polo y Martínez-Valdés; 11 June 1900 Oviedo, Asturias, Kingdom of Spain
- Died: 6 February 1988 (aged 87) Madrid, Community of Madrid, Spain
- Resting place: Mingorrubio Cemetery, Madrid
- Spouse: Francisco Franco (m. 1923; died 1975)
- Children: Carmen Franco, 1st Duchess of Franco
- Known for: Spouse of the head of state of Spain (1936–1975)

María del Carmen Polo y Martínez-Valdés, 1st Lady of Meirás, Grandee of Spain (11 June 1900 – 6 February 1988), served as First Lady of Spain as the wife of the Spanish dictator Francisco Franco. She exerted a major influence in censoring the press. She was endowed the Lordship of Meirás by King Juan Carlos I on 26 November 1975.

== Family ==
She was the daughter of Felipe Polo y Flórez de Vereterra (1860–1926), a wealthy lawyer in Oviedo, and Ramona Martínez-Valdés y Martínez-Valdés (1870 – 8 February 1914), paternal granddaughter of Claudio Polo-Vereterra y Astudillo and wife Bonifacia Flórez and sister of María Isabel (married to José María Sanchíz y Sancho), Felipe and Ramona (Zita) (married in Oviedo on 6 February 1932 to Ramón Serrano Súñer). Her aunt Isabel Polo-Vereterra y Flórez married her relative Luis Vereterra y Estrada. Her great-grandparents were Telésforo Polo y Briz and Isabel Astudillo.

== Marriage ==
Carmen Polo first met the then Major Franco, her future husband, following his posting to Oviedo from Morocco in 1917. Despite opposition from her family, they eventually became engaged, but in 1920 Franco's military career interrupted their plans for marriage.

When he returned, ready to marry, the death (5 June 1923) of Rafael de Valenzuela, successor to José Millán Astray as commander of the Spanish Legion, intervened. Franco was offered Valenzuela's command, and promotion to the rank of lieutenant colonel. His ambition was too great to resist the opportunity, and he left for Morocco on 18 July 1923, promising his fiancée: "This year we will be married, above all else. If I do not die in combat, I will return to you." Having become Spain's most decorated soldier, Franco was eventually given a leave of forty days, and royal permission to marry. The wedding took place on 22 October 1923, in the church of San Juan el Real of Oviedo. Franco's best man was King Alfonso XIII, represented by General Antonio Losada, military governor of Asturias. Serving as maid of honour was Isabel Polo, Carmen's aunt. The witnesses were the Marquis de la Vega de Anzo and Franco's brothers, Nicolás and Ramón. Franco did not invite his father, Nicolás Franco, whom he had never forgiven for leaving his mother and living in Madrid with another woman.

== Only child ==
The honeymoon lasted only a few days. Franco was needed in North Africa, and he did not wish to be accompanied by his wife. This forced separation lasted fifteen months. At age 32, Franco was promoted to full colonel and made official commander of the Legion. He finally established a home in Melilla, and Polo joined him. Franco soon rose to the rank of general. This began a new and difficult life for Polo, who would have to accustom herself to her husband's constant and unpredictable reassignments. They moved from Madrid to Zaragoza, back to Oviedo, to the Canary Islands and after the Spanish Civil War, to Salamanca and Burgos. "I felt like an authentic nomad", she said on one occasion.

In the winter of 1926, Polo moved from Zaragoza to Oviedo, hoping to bear a son. The Francos had been married three years and had produced no children. This delay, abnormal at that time, gave rise to many rumours. Later, it was officially reported that Polo gave birth to a daughter, Carmen Franco y Polo, known by the nicknames Nenuca, Carmencita, and Morita. However, historian and hispanist Paul Preston claims that Carmen may have actually been the biological daughter of Franco's younger brother, Ramón Franco and a prostitute who died after giving birth to her. The theory stems from rumours that Francisco Franco was sterile following a serious abdominal injury he had suffered in 1916. Furthermore, there is a lack of photographs showing Carmen Polo pregnant, photos of María del Carmen as a baby, and discrepancies in birth records.

== Spanish Civil War ==
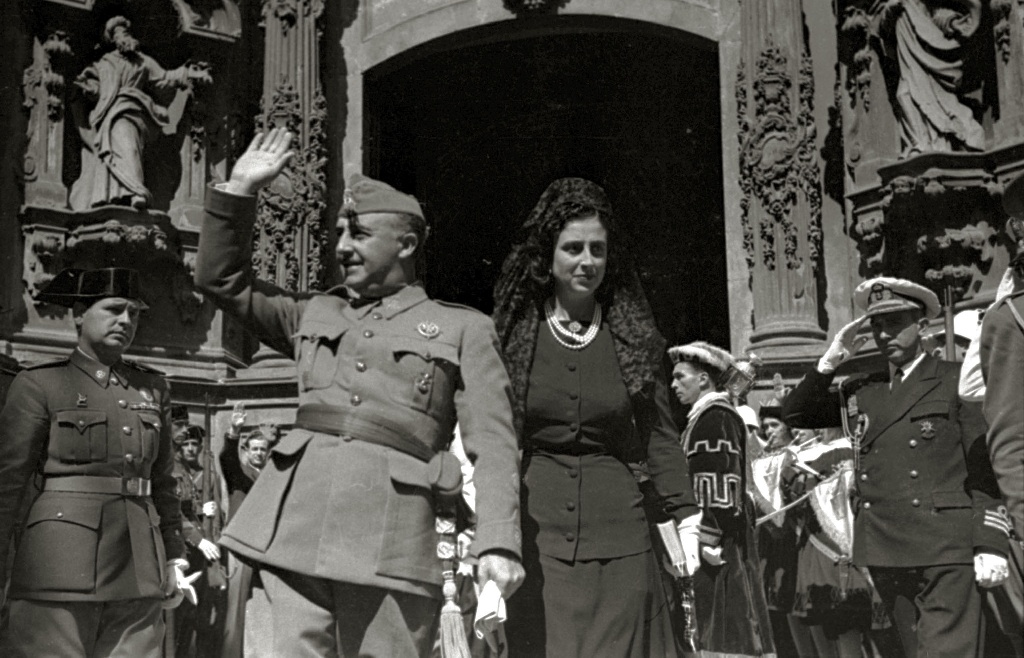
Polo and her husband in San Sebastián in 1941

In July 1936, Polo and her daughter fled to Le Havre, France, on the German steamboat Waldi. They travelled under assumed names for fear of Nenuca being kidnapped. They waited in Le Havre for Antonio Barroso, who transported them to Bayonne to the house of his former governess, Claverie. At the end of September, Franco sent his cousin and confidant, Salgado-Araujo, to find them.

In September 1936, Franco was chosen and appointed generalísimo and head of state by the National Defence Board (Junta de Defensa Nacional). Accordingly, Carmen Polo became known as the first lady of Spain. She was generally referred to simply as "La Señora", and her glamorous persona became part of Franco's image. It is rumoured that José Antonio de Sangróniz, Franco's chief diplomat, was forced to cancel a reception before the Junta de Burgos ("Military Junta of Burgos", named after the town where it was formed) because she did not have suitable clothes for the occasion.

She would never have this problem again since in 1936, she began to build up a large collection of hats, dresses and pearl necklaces, the last of which became her trademark.

== First Lady (1939–1975) ==
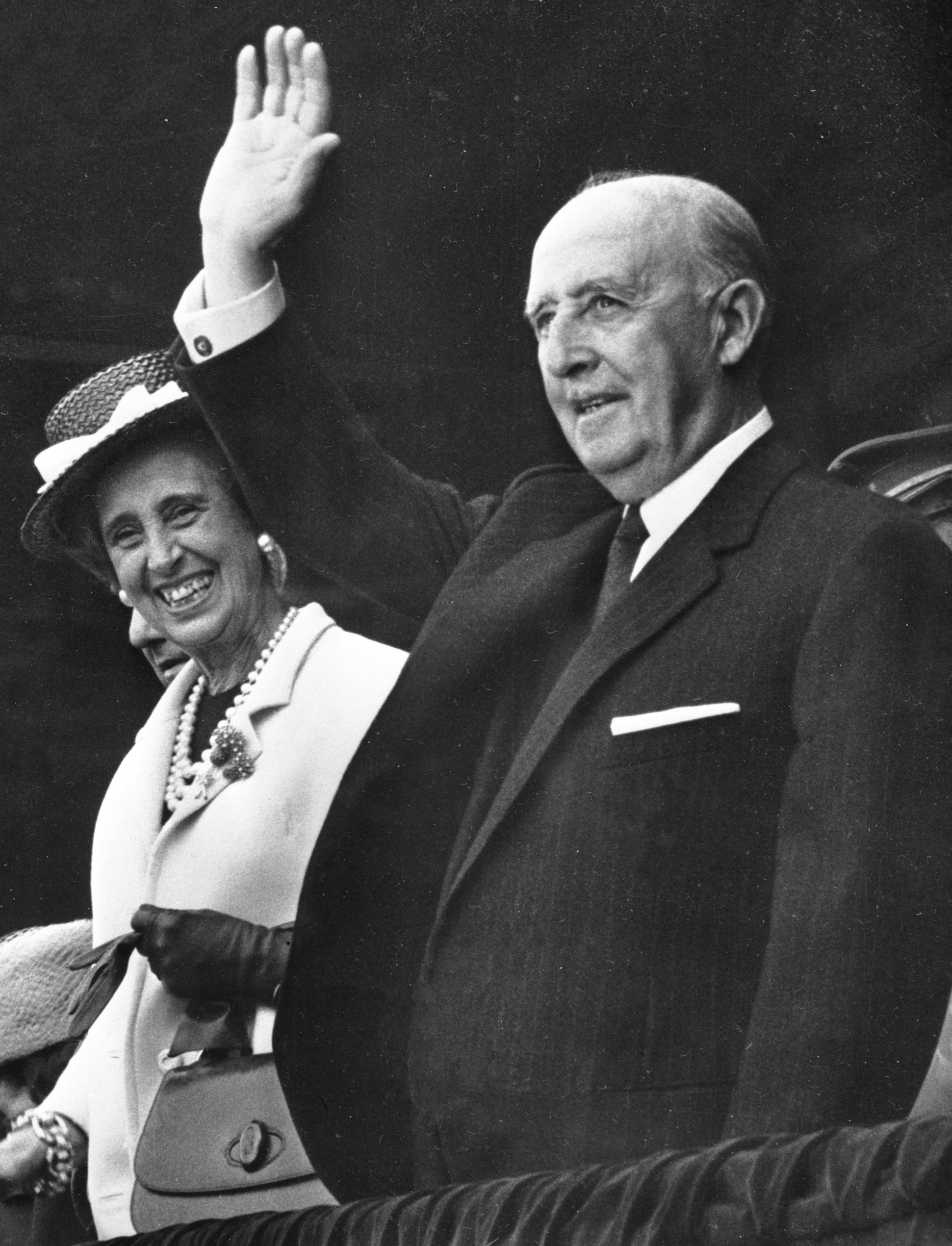
Polo with Francisco Franco, 1968

Polo almost always appeared with her husband. This caused some problems when travelling outside Madrid, since it required that Franco's ministers and advisers also be accompanied by their wives, creating problems with lodging. After the war's end, the question of the head of state's residence presented a problem. Franco was initially inclined to live in the Royal Palace of Madrid, but was disabused of this notion by Ramón Serrano Súñer. Franco instead chose the Palacio Real de El Pardo, where he settled in March 1940 following its restoration. The Francos passed their summers at the manor house Pazo de Meirás, and fishing on their yacht Azor. The home, which had formerly belonged to Emilia Pardo Bazán, was, according to the official story, bought by "popular subscription" for more than 400,000 pesetas.

Polo embarked on many foreign trips during her time as first lady. She first travelled to Portugal in 1950 and returned in 1958 and 1967. She travelled to Rome in May 1950 to witness the canonization of Antonio María Claret. During the visit, she was granted an audience with Pope Pius XII. Her husband never accompanied her on any of her trips abroad.

El Pardo was the centre of Spanish political life under Franco and also the venue for many of the Franco family's personal events. Protocol was rigorously enforced and largely dictated by la Señora, through the authority of the Casa Civil.

One of the most famous events of the Franco family was the marriage of the younger Carmen to Cristóbal Martínez-Bordiú, a son of the counts of Arguillo. In addition to his family's land holdings, he also carried the title of Marquis of Villaverde. This greatly pleased Polo, who had long held aspirations of nobility. The union produced several children, among others María del Carmen Martínez-Bordiú y Franco, the Francos' first grandchild.

Because of her fondness for wearing big pearl necklaces, she was often referred to as La Collares, roughly "Lady Necklaces".

== Later years and death ==
Coat of arms of Carmen Polo as Lady of Meirás (1975–1988)

Coat of arms of Francisco, 2nd Lord of Meirás and 11th Marquis of Villaverde

Polo devoted her later years to her grandchildren. On 8 March 1972, her granddaughter María del Carmen married Alfonso, Duke of Anjou and Cádiz, a member of the House of Bourbon. Polo hoped that this "operation" would lead to her granddaughter becoming queen. In fact, Juan Carlos ultimately succeeded to the throne. By that time, Franco was greatly diminished, both physically and mentally. With Franco's death, the family's fortunes changed dramatically.

On 26 November 1975, six days after her husband's death, King Juan Carlos gave Polo the hereditary title Señora de Meirás (English: Lady of Meirás), named after her and her husband's summer residence. She was also given the accompanying dignity Grande de España (English: Grandee of Spain). The title and dignity were inherited by her grandson Francisco Franco (who also became the 11th Marquis of Villaverde after the death of his father).

In the ensuing years, Polo witnessed the disintegration of her family. On 31 January 1976, she left El Pardo for the last time. In 1978, her daughter was arrested at Madrid Barajas International Airport for attempting to smuggle 300 million pesetas worth of gold, jewellery and medals that had belonged to her father. Her granddaughter separated from her husband and moved to Paris, where she lived with the antiquarian Jean-Marie Rossi. On 7 February 1984, Polo's great-grandson, Francisco, was killed, aged 11, in a car accident.

In her final years, Polo rarely left her house, hearing Mass at home. She isolated herself completely, ignoring (and being ignored by) the press and refusing to read anything about politics or about her husband. She explained, "It is necessary to have much Christian resignation, in light of the turmoils of my life".

Polo died in Madrid on 6 February 1988, aged 87. She was buried at Mingorrubio Cemetery in El Pardo. Her husband, who had previously been entombed at the Valle de los Caídos outside Madrid, was exhumed and reburied with her on 24 October 2019.

== Ancestors ==
Ancestors of Carmen Polo

8. Telesforo Polo y Briz
4. Claudio Polo Astudillo
9. Isabel Astudillo ...
2. Felipe Marcelino Polo Flórez
Ramón Flórez ...
5. Bonifacia Flórez Prado
Vicenta de Prado Tabia
1. María del Carmen Polo y Martínez-Valdés, 1st Lady of Meirás
Modesto Martínez-Valdés y Sánchez
6. Ramón Martínez-Valdés y Díaz
Bernarda Díaz Villar
3. Ramona Martínez-Valdés y Martínez-Valdés
Carlos Martínez-Valdés y Sánchez
7. Celestina Martínez-Valdés y Granda
María Granda Ania

Spanish nobility
New title	Lady of Meirás; 1975–1988	Succeeded by Francis Franco
