= Monument to Franco (Santa Cruz de Tenerife) =

Instance of public art

Ángel de la Victoria
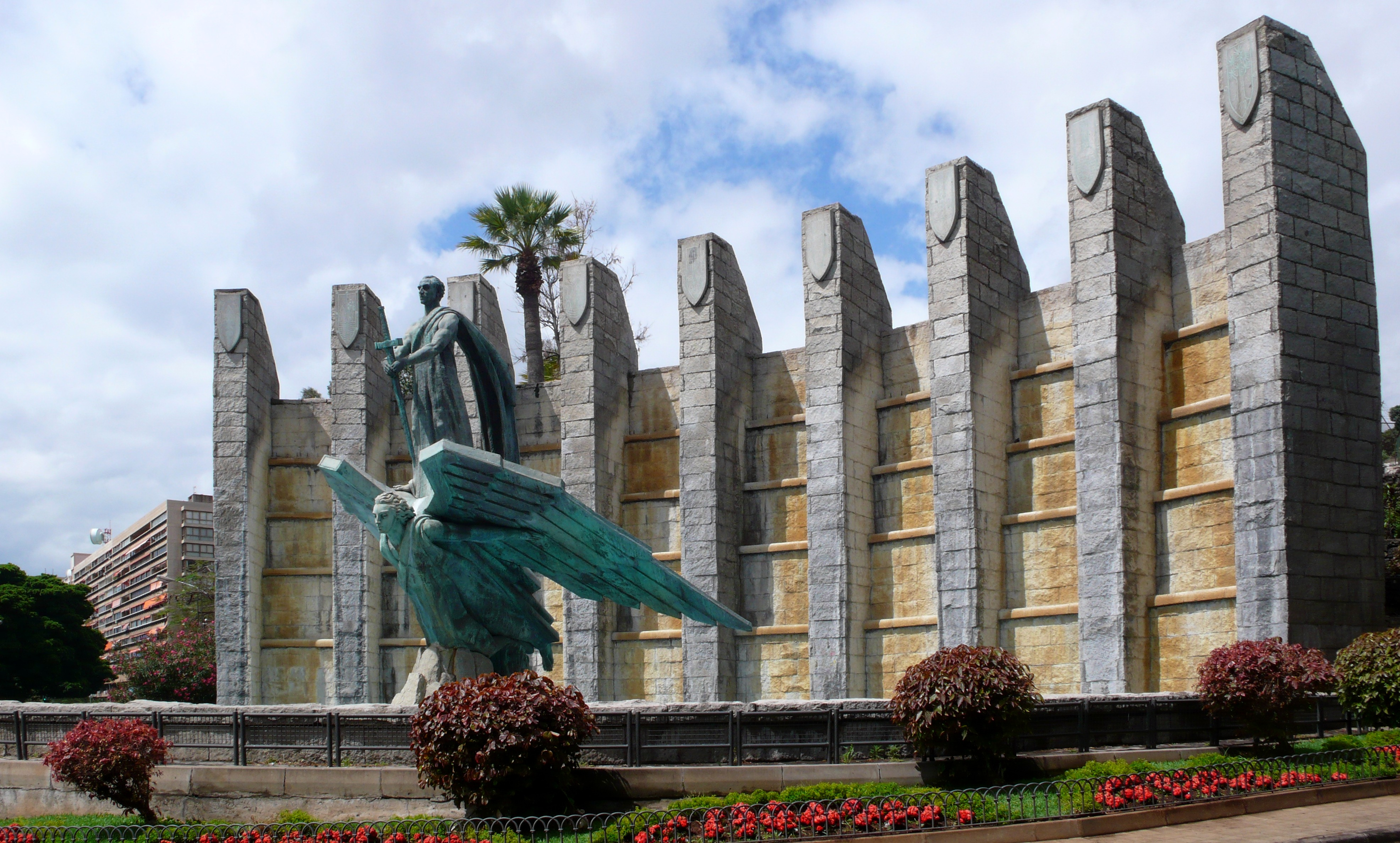
- Interactive map of Ángel de la Victoria
- Location: Santa Cruz de Tenerife, Spain
- Coordinates: 28.476406°N 16.246262°W
- Designer: Juan de Ávalos
- Material: Bronze, stone
- Height: 14 m
- Opening date: 17 March 1966
- Dedicated to: Francisco Franco

Ángel de la Victoria or the Monument to Victory (Spanish: Monumento a la Victoria), popularly known as el monumento a Franco ("the Monument to Franco"), is an instance of public art located in Santa Cruz de Tenerife, Spain. A work by Juan de Ávalos, the monument was conceived to pay homage to Francisco Franco.

== History and description ==
The monument is located at the crossroads of the Rambla de Santa Cruz and the avenida de Anaga.

The bronze sculptural group consists of a winged angel (an allegory of the Dragon Rapide, the airplane that transported Franco from the Canary Islands to the African mainland in order to kickstart the 1936 coup d'état that marked the beginning of the Spanish Civil War) and a "saviour" male figure (representing Franco) standing over the angel while wielding a sword shaped like a Christian cross that points down.

The composition lies on the centre of a near-circular pond with a 30 m maximum diameter. The backside wall partially enclosing both items reaches a maximum height of 14 m.

A work by Juan de Ávalos, it was started in 1964, unveiled on 17 March 1966, and cost around 8.1 million pesetas. It was funded by popular subscription, with 80,000 people donating to construct it, with most donating between 1 and 5 pesetas. It is currently valued at €45 million according to the Juan de Ávalos Foundation.

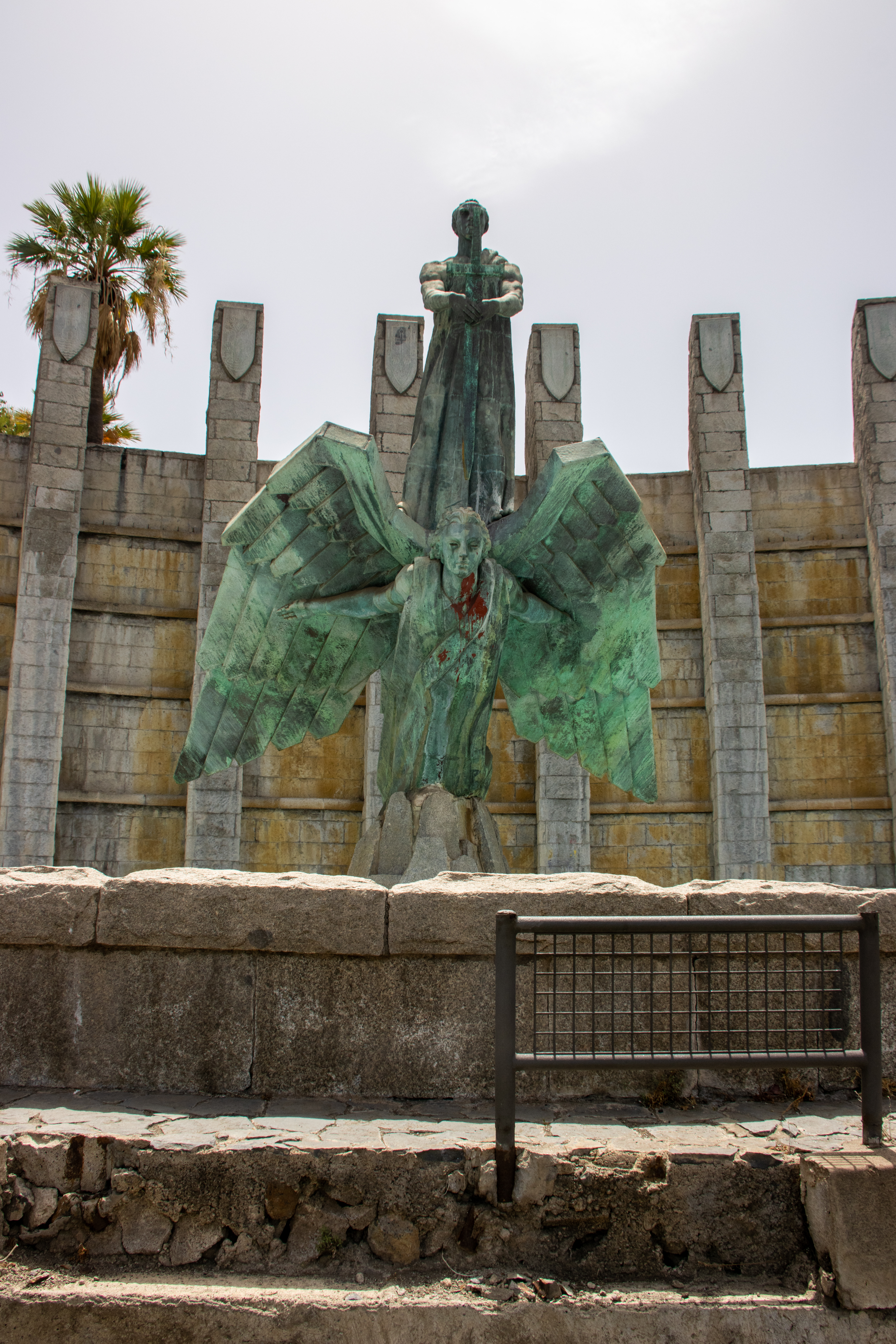
The vandalised monument in 2020

The monument was vandalised in November 2016, covered in red paint and tagged with a graffiti reading antifascismo ("anti-fascism"). There is an ongoing effort to remove the monument, based on the enforcing of the Law of Historical Memory. There is also a campaign to keep it in place on the basis of its artistic and cultural value.
