= Romanones =

- Municipality
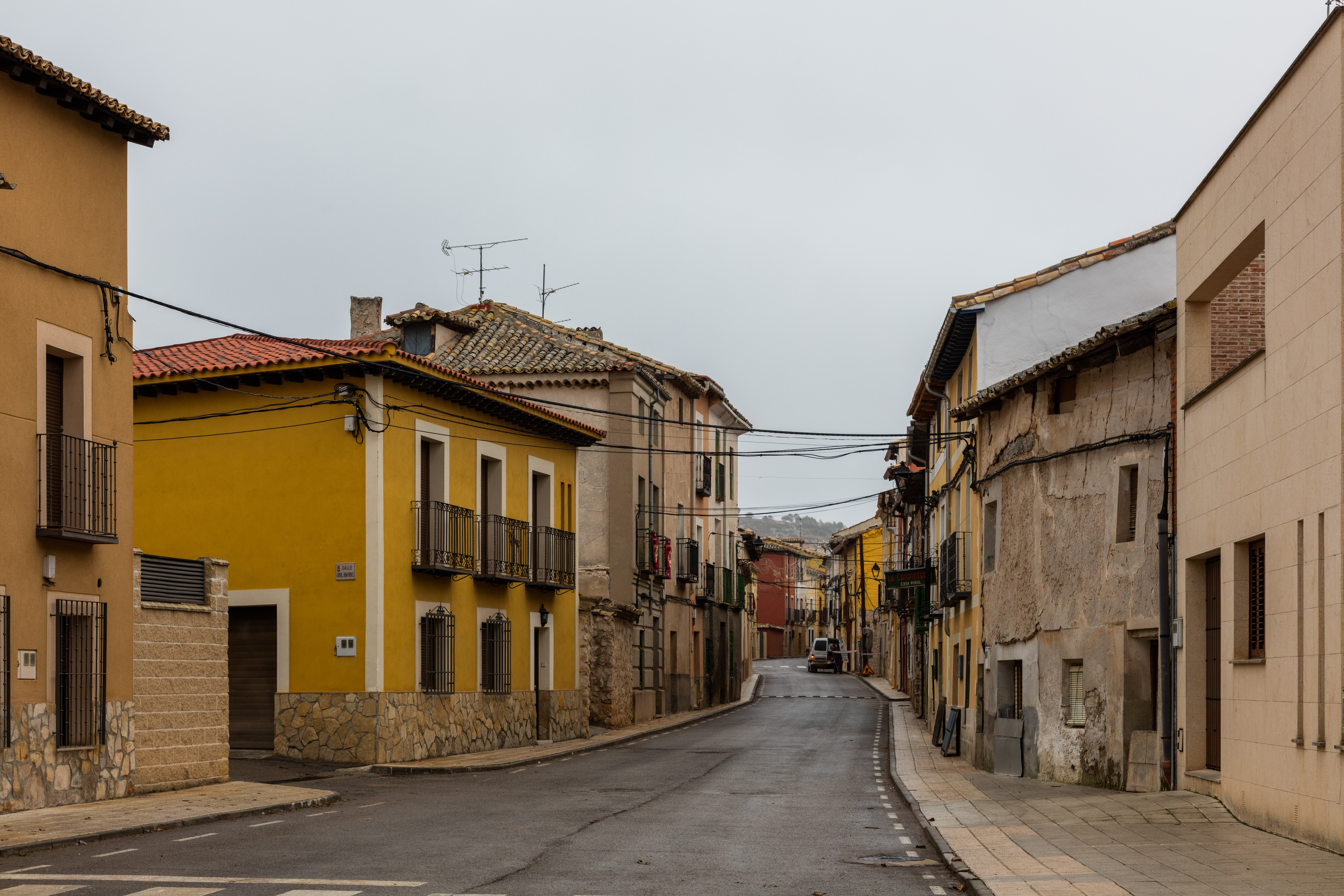

- Coat of arms

- Location within Spain Location within Castilla-La Mancha Location within Province of Guadalajara
- Country: Spain
- Autonomous community: Castilla–La Mancha
- Province: Guadalajara

Area
  - Total: 28.88 km^{2} (11.15 sq mi)
- Elevation: 755 m (2,477 ft)

Population (2025-01-01)
  - Total: 127
  - Density: 4.40/km^{2} (11.4/sq mi)
- Time zone: UTC+1 (CET)
  - Summer (DST): UTC+2 (CEST)

Romanones is a municipality of Spain located in the province of Guadalajara, Castilla–La Mancha. The municipality has a total area of 28.88 km^{2}. As of 1 January 2019, it has a registered population of 99 inhabitants.

== See also ==
- List of municipalities in Guadalajara
