= Family tree of Spanish monarchs =

The following is the family tree of the Spanish monarchs from the former kingdoms of Aragon (see family tree), Castile (see family tree) and Navarre (see family tree). They unified in 1469 as personal union, with the marriage of the Catholic Monarchs of Isabella I of Castile and Ferdinand II of Aragon to become the Kingdom of Spain. This was only de facto unification until Philip V's Nueva Planta decrees in 1715 unified them de jure.

== Kingdom of Spain and its antecedents ==
Legitimate children
- - - - - - Marriage
............... Liaison and illegitimate children

Asturias created, 718; Astur-Leonese dynasty
Pelagius c. 685–737; King of Asturias r. 718–737	Peter d. 730; Duke of Cantabria
Favila c. 710–739; King of Asturias r. 737–739	Ermesinda b. c. 720 or 730	Alfonso I the Catholic c. 693–757; King of Asturias r. 739–757	Fruela Pérez of Cantabria c. 708 – c. 756
Fruela I the Cruel c. 722–768; King of Asturias r. 757–768	Adosinda	Silo d. 783; King of Asturias r. 774–783	Mauregatus d. 789; King of Asturias r. 783–789	Aurelius c. 740–774; King of Asturias r. 768–774	Bermudo I the Deacon c. 750–797; King of Asturias r. 788/789–791
Kingdom of Pamplona proclaimed, 824; House of Íñiguez
Alfonso II the Chaste c. 760–842; King of Asturias r. 791–842	Ramiro I c. 790–850; King of Asturias r. 842–850	Íñigo Arista c. 771–790 – c. 852; King of Pamplona r. c. 816–824 – c. 852
Ordoño I c. 821–866; King of Asturias r. 850–866	García Íñiguez c. 810–870/882; King of Pamplona r. c. 852 – 870/882
House of Jiménez
Alfonso III the Great c. 848–910; King of Asturias r. 866–910	García Jiménez	Fortún Garcés the One-eyed d. 922; King of Pamplona r. 870/882–905
León divided, 910	Galicia divided, 910
García I c. 871–914; King of León r. 910–914	Ordoño II c. 873–924; King of Galicia r. 910–924; King of León r. 914–924	Fruela II c. 874–925; King of Asturias r. 910–924; King of León r. 924–925	Sancho I c. 860–925; King of Pamplona r. 905–925	Jimeno Garcés; Jimeno II d. 932/933; King of Pamlona r. 925–932/933	Aznar Sánchez of Larraun
Sancho Ordóñez c. 895–929; King of Galicia r. 926–929	Alfonso IV the Monk c. 890s–933 King of León r. 925/926–931; King of Galicia r. 929–931	Ramiro II c. 900–951; King of León r. 931–951	Alfonso Fróilaz the Hunchback ? King of León r. 925; King of Galicia r. 925; King of Asturias r. 925	García Sánchez I c. 919–970; King of Pamplona r. 925–970	Sancha Aznárez
Viguera created, 970
Ordoño III c. 926–956; King of León r. 951–956	Sancho II the Fat c. 932–966; King of León r. 956–958 r. 960–966	Sancho II bef. 935–994; King of Pamplona r. 970–994	Ramiro Garcés d. 981; King of Viguera r. 970–981
Asturias annexed by León, 924
Bermudo II the Gouty c. 953–999 (rival) King of Galicia r. 982–999; King of León r. 984–999	García Sánchez II d. 1000; King of Pamplona r. 994–1000	Sancho Ramírez d. 1002; King of Viguera r. 981–1002	García Ramírez d. aft. 1005; King of Viguera r. 1002–1005?
Viguera reabsorbed into Pamplona c. 1005–1030
Elvira Menéndez c. 996–1022	Alfonso V the Noble c. 994–1028; King of León r. 999–1028	Urraca Garcés fl. c. 1000–1035	Muniadona of Castile	Sancho III the Great c. 992–996–1035; King of Pamplona r. 1004–1035
The County of Aragon became the Kingdom of Aragon, 1035
Bermudo III c. 1015–1037; King of León r. 1028–1037	Sancha of León d. 1067	Ferdinand I the Great c. 1015–1065; King of León r. 1037–1065	García Sánchez III from Nájera c. 1012–1054; King of Pamplona r. 1034–1054	Ramiro I bef. 1007–1063; King of Aragon r. 1035–1063
The County of Castile became the Kingdom of Castile, 1065	Galicia became autonomous, 1065
Sancho II the Strong; 1036/1038–1072; King of Castile r. 1065–1072; King of Galicia r. 1071–1072; King of León r. 1072	Alfonso VI the Brave c. 1040/1041–1109; King of León r. 1065–1072 r. 1072–1109; King of Galicia r. 1071–1109; King of Castile r. 1072–1109	Garcia II; 1041/1043–1090; King of Galicia r. 1065–1071	Sancho IV of Peñalén c. 1039–1076; King of Pamplona r. 1054–1076	Sancho Ramírez c. 1042–1094; King of Aragon r. 1063–1094; King of Pamplona r. 1076–1094	Sancho Garcés c. 1038–1083; Lord of Uncastillo
Castilian House of Ivrea
Raymond of Burgundy c. 1070–1107; King of Galicia r. 1093–1096	Urraca; 1081–1126; Queen of León and Castile r. 1109–1126; Queen of Galicia r. 1109–1111	Alfonso I the Battler c. 1073/1074–1134; King of Aragon and Navarre r. 1104–1134	Peter I c. 1068–1104; King of Aragon and Pamploma r. 1094–1104	Ramiro II the Monk; 1086–1157; King of Aragon r. 1134–1137	Ramiro Sánchez c. 1070–1129/1130; Lord of Monzón
Navarre independent from Aragon, 1134
Alfonso VII; Raimúndez, the Emperor; 1105–1157; King of Galicia r. 1111–1157; King of León and Castile r. 1126–1157	García Ramírez (IV/V/VI/VII) the Restorer c. 1112–1150; King of Pamplona/Navarre r. 1134–1150
House of Barcelona
Sancho III the Desired c. 1134–1158; King of Castile r. 1157–1158	Ferdinand II c. 1137–1188; King of León and Galicia r. 1157–1188	Petronilla; 1136–1173; Queen of Aragon r. 1137–1164	Ramón Berenguer IV c. 1114–1162; Count of Barcelona	Sancho VI the Wise; 1132–1194; King of Navarre r. 1150–1194
Alfonso VIII the Noble; 1155–1214; King of Castile r. 1158–1214	Sancha of Castile of Castile; 1154/1155–1208	Alfonso II the Chaste; 1157–1196; King of Aragon r. 1164–1196	Sancho VII the Strong; 1154–1234; King of Navarre r. 1194–1234
Henry I 1204–1217; King of Castile r. 1214–1217	Berengaria the Great; 1179/1180–1246; Queen of Castile r. 1217	Alfonso IX; 1171–1230; King of León and Galicia r. 1188–1230	Peter II; 1178–1213; King of Aragon r. 1196–1213	Navarre ruled by French counts and French kings. See Family tree of Navarrese monarchs
León and Galicia joined in personal union with Castile, 1230	Valencia became a component realm of Aragon, 1238
Ferdinand III the Saint; 1199/1201–1252; King of Castile r. 1217–1252	James I the Conqueror; 1208–1276; King of Aragon r. 1213–1276; King of Majorca r. 1231–1276; King of Valencia r. 1238–1276
Majorca divided from Aragon, 1276.
Alfonso X the Wise; 1221–1284; King of Castile r. 1252–1284	Peter III c. 1239–1285; King of Aragon r. 1276–1285	James II; 1243–1311; King of Majorca r. 1276–1286, r. 1295–1311
Sancho IV the Brave; 1258–1295; King of Castile r. 1284–1295	Alfonso III the Liberal; 1265–1291; King of Aragon r. 1285–1291	James II the Just; 1267–1327; King of Aragon r. 1291–1327
Ferdinand IV the Summoned; 1285–1312; King of Castile r. 1295–1312	Sancho the Pacific c. 1277–1324; King of Majorca r. 1311–1324	Ferdinand of Majorca; 1278–1316
Eleanor of Castile; 1307–1359	Alfonso IV the Kind; 1299–1336; King of Aragon r. 1327–1336
Maria of Portugal; 1313–1357	Alfonso XI the Avenger; 1311–1350; King of Castile r. 1312–1350	Peter IV the Honest; 1319–1387; King of Aragon and Majorca r. 1336–1387	James II; 1315–1349; King of Majorca r. 1324–1344
Majorca conquered by Aragon, 1344
House of Trastámara
Peter the Cruel; 1334–1369; King of Castile r. 1350–1369	Henry II the Fratricidal; 1334–1379; King of Castile r. 1369–1379
John I 1358–1390; King of Castile r. 1379–1390	Eleanor of Aragon; 1358–1382	John I the Hunter; 1350–1396; King of Aragon r. 1387–1396	Martin the Humane; 1356–1410; King of Aragon r. 1396–1410
Henry III the Infirm; 1379–1406; King of Castile r. 1390–1406	Ferdinand I the Honest; 1380–1416; King of Aragon r. 1412–1416
Maria of Aragon; 1403–1445	John II; 1405–1454; King of Castile r. 1406–1454	Alfonso V the Magnanimous; 1396–1458; King of Aragon r. 1416–1458	John II the Great; 1398–1479; King of Aragon r. 1458–1479
House of Habsburg
Henry IV the Impotent; 1425–1474; King of Castile r. 1454–1474	Isabella I 1451–1504; Queen of Castile r. 1474–1504	Ferdinand II; 1452–1516; King of Aragon r. 1479–1516; King of Castile jure uxoris r. 1475–1504	Maximilian I Holy Roman Emperor; 1459–1519
Kingdoms of Castile and Aragon joined in personal union, 1469
John; Prince of Asturias; 1478–1497	Margaret; Duchess of Savoy; 1480–1530	Joanna the Mad; 1479–1555; Queen Castile r. 1504–1555; Queen of Aragon r. 1516–1555	Philip I the Handsome; 1478–1506; King of Castile Jure uxoris r. 1506	Catherine of Aragon; 1485–1536	Henry VIII of England; 1491–1547
m1. Isabella of Aragon; 1470–1498	Manuel I of Portugal; 1469–1521	m2. Maria of Aragon; 1482–1517	m3. Eleanor of Austria; 1498–1558	Francis I of France; 1494–1547	Isabella of Austria; 1501–1526	Christian II of Denmark; 1481–1559	Ferdinand I Holy Roman Emperor; 1503–1564	Anne of Bohemia and Hungary; 1503–1547
John III of Portugal; 1502–1557	Catherine of Austria; 1507–1578	Isabella of Portugal; 1503–1539	Charles I(V); Holy Roman Emperor; 1500–1558; King of Spain r. 1516–1556	Mary of Hungary; 1505–1558	Louis II of Hungary; 1506–1526	Anna of Austria; 1528–1590
João Manuel; Prince of Portugal; 1537–1554	Joanna of Austria; 1535–1573	Maria of Austria; 1528–1603	Maximilian II; Holy Roman Emperor; 1527–1576	Charles II of Austria; 1540–1590	Maria Anna of Bavaria; 1551–1608
m1. Maria Manuela of Portugal; 1527–1545	m3. Elisabeth of Valois; 1545–1568	Philip II(I) of England, Naples, Sicily, Sardinia, and Portugal; 1527–1598; King of Spain r. 1556–1598	m4. Anna of Austria; 1549–1580	m2. Mary I of England; 1516–1558
Henry IV of France; 1553–1610	Carlos; Prince of Asturias; 1545–1568	Catherine Michelle; 1567–1597	Charles Emmanuel I of Savoy; 1562–1630	Isabella Clara Eugenia; 1566–1633	Albert VII of Austria; 1559–1621	Philip III of Naples, Portugal, Sardinia, and Sicily; 1578–1621; King of Spain r. 1598–1621	Margaret of Austria; 1584–1611	Ferdinand II; Holy Roman Emperor; 1578–1637
Louis XIII of France; 1601–1643	Anne of Austria; 1601–1666	Charles of Austria; 1607–1632	Ferdinand of Austria; 1609/1610 –1641	Maria Anna of Spain; 1606–1646	Ferdinand III; Holy Roman Emperor; 1608–1657	Eleonora Gonzaga of Mantua and Nevers; 1630–1686
Elisabeth of France; 1602–1644	Philip IV of Naples, Portugal, Sardinia, and Sicily; 1605–1665; King of Spain r. 1621–1665	Mariana of Austria; 1634–1696	Philip; Elector Palatine; 1615–1690
Louis XIV of France; 1638–1715	Maria Theresa of Spain; 1638–1683	Philippe I of Orléans; 1640–1701	Balthasar Charles; Prince of Asturias; 1629–1646	John Joseph of Austria; 1629–1679	Margaret Theresa of Spain; 1651–1673	Leopold I Holy Roman Emperor; 1640–1705	Eleonore of Neuburg; 1655–1720	Eleonore of Austria; 1653–1657
Louis; Grand Dauphin of France; 1661–1711	Philippe II of Orléans; 1674–1723	Anne Marie d'Orléans; 1669–1728	Marie Louise of Orléans; 1662–1689	Charles II; 1661–1700; King of Spain r. 1665–1700	Maria Anna of Neuburg; 1667–1740	Dorothea Sophie of Neuburg; 1670–1748	Maria Antonia of Austria; 1669–1692	Charles VI; Holy Roman Emperor; 1685–1740	Leopold Duke of Lorraine; 1679–1729
House of Bourbon
Louis; Duke of Burgundy; 1682–1712	Maria Luisa of Savoy; 1688–1714	Philip V 1683–1746; King of Spain r. 1700–1724, r. 1724–1746	Isabel de Farnesio; 1692–1766	John V of Portugal; 1689–1750	Joseph Ferdinand of Bavaria; 1692–1699	Maria Theresa; 1717–1780	Francis I Holy Roman Emperor; 1708–1765
Louis XV of France; 1710–1774	Louise Elisabeth of Orleans; 1709–1742	Louis I 1707–1724; King of Spain r. 1724	Ferdinand VI; 1713–1759; King of Spain r. 1746–1759	Barbara de Braganza; 1711–1758	Mariana Victoria of Spain; 1718–1781	Joseph I of Portugal; 1714–1777	Maria Antonia of Spain; 1729–1785	Victor Amadeus III of Savoy; 1726–1796
Louis; Dauphin of France; 1729–1765	Maria Teresa of Spain; 1726–1746	Louise; Élisabeth of France; 1727–1759	Philip I of Parma; 1720–1765	Charles III of Naples, Sicily, and Spain; 1716–1788 r. 1759–1788	Maria Amalia of Saxony; 1724–1760	Luis; Count of Chinchón; 1727–1785	Peter III of Portugal; 1717–1786	Maria I of Portugal; 1734–1816
Maria Josefa of Spain; 1744–1801	Philip; Duke of Calabria; 1747–1777	Francisco Javier of Spain; 1757–1771	Gabriel of Spain; 1752–1788	Mariana Victoria of Braganza; 1768–1788
Antonio Pascual of Spain; 1755–1817	Charles IV; 1748–1819; King of Spain r. 1788–1808	Maria Luisa of Parma; 1751–1819	Lucia Migliaccio; Duchess of Floridia; 1770–1826	Ferdinand I of Naples, Sicily, and the Two Sicilies; 1751–1825	Maria Carolina of Austria; 1752–1814	Joseph II; Holy Roman Emperor; 1741–1790	Marie Antoinette; 1755–1793	Maria Luisa of Spain; 1745–1792	Leopold II; Holy Roman Emperor; 1747–1792
María Amalia of Spain; 1779–1798	Francis I of the Two Sicilies; 1777–1830	María Isabella of Spain; 1789–1848	Louis I of Etruria; 1773–1803	Maria Luisa; Duchess of Lucca; 1782–1824	Carlota Joaquina of Spain; 1775–1830	John VI of Portugal; 1767–1826	Francis II; Holy Roman Emperor; 1768–1835	Rainer Joseph of Austria; 1783–1853
Francisco de Paula; 1794–1865	Luisa Carlotta of Naples and Sicily; 1804–1844	m4. Maria Christina of the Two Sicilies; 1806–1878	Ferdinand VII; 1784–1833; King of Spain r. 1808, r. 1813–1833	m1. Maria Antonia of Naples and Sicily; 1784–1806	m3. Maria Josepha Amalia of Saxony; 1803–1829	m2. Maria Isabel of Portugal; 1797–1818	Maria Francisca of Bragança; 1800–1834	Carlos; Count of Molina; Carlist pretender 1788–1855	Maria Teresa; Princess of Beira; 1793–1874
Amelia of Spain; 1834–1905	Francis; Duke of Cádiz; 1822–1902	Isabella II; 1830–1904; Queen of Spain r. 1833–1868	Luisa; Duchess of Montpensier; 1832–1897	Antoine; Duke of Montpensier; 1824–1890	Maria Carolina of Bourbon-Two Sicilies; 1820–1861	Carlos; Count of Montemolin; 1818–1861	Juan; Count of Montizón; 1822–1887	Fernando of Spain; 1824–1861	Adelaide of Austria; 1822–1855
House of Savoy
Ludwig of Bavaria; 1859–1949	Maria de la Paz; 1862–1946	Mercedes of Orléans; 1860–1878	Alfonso XII; 1857–1885; King of Spain r. 1874–1885	Maria Christina of Austria; 1858–1929	Eulalia; Duchess of Galliera; 1864–1958	Antonio; Duke of Galliera; 1866–1930	Alfonso Carlos; Duke of San Jaime; 1849–1936	Carlos; Duke of Madrid; 1848–1909	Amadeo I 1845–1890; King of Spain r. 1870–1873
Isabella; Princess of Asturias; 1851–1931	Gaetan; Count of Girgenti; 1846–1871	Marie Isabelle of Orléans; 1848–1919	Philippe; Count of Paris; 1838–1894	Leopold Salvator of Austria; 1863–1931	Blanca; Archduchess of Austria; 1868–1949	Jaime; Duke of Madrid; 1870–1931
Ferdinand of Bavaria; 1884–1958	Maria Teresa of Spain; 1882–1912	Victoria of Battenberg; 1887–1969	Alfonso XIII; 1886–1941; King of Spain r. 1886–1931	Mercedes; Princess of Asturias; 1880–1904	Carlos of Bourbon Two Sicilies; 1870–1949	Louise d'Orléans; 1882–1958	Anton of Austria; 1901–1987	Franz Josef of Austria; 1905–1975	Karl Pius of Austria; 1909–1953
Edelmira; Countess of Covadonga; 1906–1994	Alfonso; Prince of Asturias; 1907–1938	Marta; Rocafort- Altuzarra; 1913–1993	Jaime; Duke of Segovia, Legitimist pretender 1908–1975	Beatriz of Spain; 1909–2002	Alessandro Torlonia of Civitella-Cesi; 1911–1986	María Mercedes of Bourbon y Orleans; 1910–2000	Juan; Count of Barcelona; 1913–1993	Maria Cristina; Countess Marone; 1911–1996	Gonzalo of Spain; 1914–1934
Alfonso; Duke of Anjou and Cádiz; 1936–1989	Gonzalo; Duke of Aquitaine; 1937–2000	Luis; Gómez-Acebo; 1934–1991	Pilar; Duchess of Badajoz; 1936–2020	Juan Carlos I b. 1938; King of Spain r. 1975–2014	Sofía of Greece b. 1938	Carlos Zurita; Duke of Soria b. 1943	Margarita; Duchess of Soria b. 1939	Alfonso of Spain; 1941–1956
Louis Alphonse de Bourbon; Duke of Anjou b. 1974	Simoneta Gómez-Acebo b. 1968	Juan Gómez-Acebo; Viscount de la Torre; 1969–2024	Bruno Gómez-Acebo b. 1971	Luis Gómez-Acebo b. 1973	Fernando Gómez-Acebo; 1974–2024	Alfonso Zurita y de Borbón b. 1973	María Zurita y de Borbón b. 1975
Jaime de Marichalar b. 1963	Elena; Duchess of Lugo b. 1963	Cristina of Spain b. 1965	Iñaki Urdangarin b. 1968	Felipe VI b. 1968; King of Spain r. 2014–present	Letizia Ortiz Rocasolano b. 1972
Felipe de Marichalar b. 1998	Victoria de Marichalar b. 2000	Juan Urdangarín y de Borbón b. 1999	Pablo Urdangarín y de Borbón b. 2000	Miguel Urdangarín y de Borbón b. 2002	Irene Urdangarín y de Borbón b. 2005	Leonor; Princess of Asturias b. 2005	Sofía of Spain b. 2007

== See also ==
- Descendants of Ferdinand II of Aragon and Isabella I of Castile
- Descendants of Philip V of Spain
- Descendants of Charles III of Spain
- Descendants of Alfonso XIII of Spain
- List of Spanish monarchs
- List of Spanish consorts
- Monarchy of Spain
