= Descendants of Alfonso XIII =

The descendants of Alfonso XIII, Bourbon monarch of the Kingdom of Spain, are numerous. With his wife, Victoria Eugenie of Battenberg, he had a total of six legitimate children, with an additional child Ferdinand having been stillborn. Outside of his marriage, Alfonso was known to have had some issue, but they are not in the line of succession for any throne. The modern day king and royal family of Spain is descended from Alfonso, as is the legitimist claimant to France.

== Legitimate issue by Victoria Eugenie of Battenberg ==
=== Alfonso, Prince of Asturias ===
Descendant	Portrait	Birth	Marriages	Death
Alfonso, Prince of Asturias		10 May 1907; Madrid son of Alfonso XIII of Spain and Victoria Eugenie of Battenberg	Edelmira Sampedro y Robato; 21 June 1933 no children Marta Esther Rocafort-Altuzarra; 3 July 1937 no children	6 September 1938; Miami aged 31

=== Infante Jaime, Duke of Segovia ===
Descendant	Portrait	Birth	Marriages	Death
Infante Jaime, Duke of Segovia		23 June 1908; Segovia son of Alfonso XIII of Spain and Victoria Eugenie of Battenberg	Emmanuelle de Dampierre; 4 March 1935; Rome; 2 sons	20 March 1975; St. Gallen aged 66
Alfonso, Duke of Anjou and Cádiz		20 April 1936; Rome son of Infante Jaime, Duke of Segovia and Emmanuelle de Dampierre	María del Carmen Martínez-Bordiú y Franco; 8 March 1972; Royal Palace of El Pardo; 2 sons	30 January 1989; Beaver Creek aged 53
Louis Alphonse, Duke of Anjou		25 April 1974; Madrid son of Alfonso, Duke of Anjou and Cádiz and María del Carmen Martínez-Bordiú y Franco	María Margarita Vargas Santaella; 5 November 2004; Caracas; 4 children	

=== Infanta Beatriz of Spain ===
Descendant	Portrait	Birth	Marriages	Death
Infanta Beatriz of Spain		22 June 1909; Segovia daughter of Alfonso XIII of Spain and Victoria Eugenie of Battenberg	Alessandro Torlonia, 5th Prince of Civitella-Cesi; 14 January 1935; 4 children	22 November 2002; Rome aged 93
Marco Torlonia, 6th Prince of Civitella-Cesi		2 July 1937; Rome son of Infanta Beatriz of Spain and Alessandro Torlonia, 5th Prince of Civitella-Cesi	Orsetta Caracciolo di Castagneto; 6 September 1960; 1 child Philippa McDonald; 9 November 1968; 1 child Blažena Svitáková; 11 November 1985; 1 child	5 December 2014 aged 77
Giovanni Torlonia, 7th Prince of Civitella-Cesi		18 April 1962 son of Marco Torlonia, 6th Prince of Civitella-Cesi and Donna Orsetta Caracciolo	Carla DeStefanis; 9 June 2001; 2 children	

=== Infanta Maria Cristina of Spain ===
Descendant	Portrait	Birth	Marriages	Death
Infanta Maria Cristina of Spain		12 December 1911; Madrid daughter of Alfonso XIII of Spain and Victoria Eugenie of Battenberg	Enrico Eugenio Marone-Cinzano, 1st Count Marone; 10 June 1940; 4 daughters	23 December 1996; Madrid aged 85
Vittoria Marone Cinzano		5 March 1940; Turin daughter of Infanta Maria Cristina of Spain and Enrico Marone Cinzano	José Carlos Álvarez de Toledo y Gross, Count of Villapaterna; 4 children	

=== Infante Juan, Count of Barcelona ===
Descendant	Portrait	Birth	Marriages	Death
Infante Juan, Count of Barcelona		20 June 1913; Royal Palace of La Granja de San Ildefonso son of Alfonso XIII of Spain and Victoria Eugenie of Battenberg	Princess Maria Mercedes of Bourbon-Two Sicilies; 12 October 1935; 4 children	1 April 1993; Pamplona aged 79
Juan Carlos I of Spain		5 January 1938; Rome son of Infante Juan, Count of Barcelona and Princess Maria Mercedes of Bourbon-Two Sicilies	Sofia of Greece and Denmark; 14 May 1962; 3 children	
Felipe VI of Spain		30 January 1968; Madrid son of Juan Carlos I of Spain and Queen Sofía of Spain	Letizia, Princess of Asturias; 22 May 2004; 2 daughters	

=== Infante Gonzalo of Spain ===
Descendant	Portrait	Birth	Marriages	Death
Infante Gonzalo of Spain		24 October 1914; Madrid son of Alfonso XIII of Spain and Victoria Eugenie of Battenberg	never married	13 August 1934; Pörtschach am Wörthersee aged 19

== Illegitimate issue ==
Alfonso also had five known illegitimate children:

by French aristocrat Mélanie de Gaufridy de Dortan (1876–1937), married to Joseph-Marie-Philippe Lévêque de Vilmorin, he had:

- Roger Marie Vincent Philippe Lévêque de Vilmorin (12 September 1905 – 20 July 1980), who was recognized by Philippe de Vilmorin

by Béatrice Noon, he had:

- Juana Alfonsa Milán y Quiñones de León (19 April 1916 – 16 May 2005)

by Spanish actress María del Carmen Ruiz y Moragas (1898 – 20 May 1936), he had:

- Ana María Teresa Ruiz y Moragas (9 October 1925 – 6 September 1965)
- Leandro Alfonso Luis Ruiz y Moragas (26 April 1929 – 18 June 2016), officially recognized by Spanish Courts on 21 May 2003 as Leandro Alfonso Luis de Borbón y Ruiz Moragas (or simply Leandro de Borbón)

by Carmen de Navascués, he had:

- Carmen Gravina (1926–2006)
