= Infanta María Cristina of Spain =

Spanish infanta

Infanta Maria Cristina
- Countess Marone
- Official portrait by Christian Franzen, ca. 1923
- Born: 12 December 1911; Palacio Real, Madrid, Spain
- Died: 23 December 1996 (aged 85); Villa Giralda, Madrid, Spain
- Burial: Marone-Cinzano Pantheon, Turin, Italy
- Spouse: Enrico Marone-Cinzano, 1st Count Marone (m. 1940; died 1968)
- Issue Detail: Donna Vittoria Álvarez de Toledo, Dowager Marchioness of Casa Loring; Donna Giovanna Sánchez-Merlo; Donna Maria Theresa Marone-Cinzano; Donna Anna Alessandra Schwartz
Names
- Spanish: María Cristina Teresa Alejandra María de Guadalupe María de la Concepción Ildefonsa Victoria Eugenia de Borbón y Battenberg
- House: Bourbon
- Father: Alfonso XIII of Spain
- Mother: Victoria Eugenie of Battenberg

Infanta Maria Cristina of Spain, Countess Marone-Cinzano (María Cristina Teresa Alejandra María de Guadalupe María de la Concepción Ildefonsa Victoria Eugenia de Borbón y Battenberg; 12 December 1911 – 23 December 1996) was the fourth surviving child and youngest daughter of Alfonso XIII of Spain and Victoria Eugenie of Battenberg and paternal aunt of King Juan Carlos I.

== Biography ==
=== Early life ===
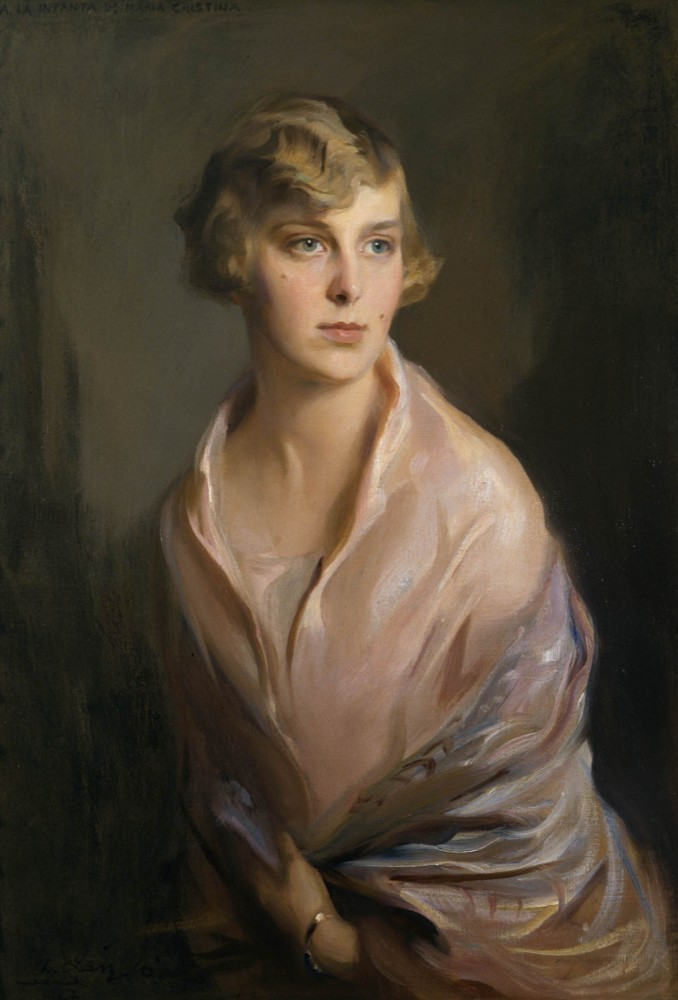
Portrait by Philip de László, 1927

Infanta Maria Cristina was born at the Palacio Real in Madrid, Spain. The Spanish royal family left the country in 1931, in the face of Republican demonstrations, settling in Paris, before moving to Fontainebleau.

By 1933 King Alfonso and his daughters, the Infantas Beatriz and Maria Cristina, had moved to Rome. Their father warned would-be suitors of the inherent dangers of hemophilia, from which two of the king's sons, Alfonso and Gonzalo, suffered.

=== Marriage and issue ===
Letterhead of Infanta Maria Cristina.

She renounced her succession rights to the throne of the defunct Spanish crown and, on 10 June 1940, morganatically married Conte Enrico Eugenio Marone-Cinzano (Turin, 15 March 1895 – Geneva, 23 October 1968) in Rome. He had been created 1st Count Marone-Cinzano on 13 May 1940 by Victor Emmanuel III of Italy. He was the son of Alberto Marone and his wife, Paola Cinzano. Maria Cristina had one step-son, from Enrico's previous marriage to Noemí Rosa de Alcorta y García-Mansilla (1907–1929):

- Don Alberto, 2nd Count Marone-Cinzano (1929–1989), married Donna Cristina, dei Conti Camerana (born 1935), great-granddaughter of Giovanni Agnelli. They had issue.

The marriage of Maria Cristina and Enrico Eugenio produced four daughters:

- Donna Vittoria Eugenia Alfonsa Alberta del Pilar Enrica Paola dei Conti Marone-Cinzano (born Turin, 5 March 1941), married José Carlos Álvarez de Toledo y Gross, 6th Marquess of Casa Loring (1929–2000) on 12 January 1961. They have four children and eight grandchildren.
  - Vittoria Eugenia Álvarez de Toledo y Marone-Cinzano, 7th Marchioness of Casa Loring (born 8 October 1961), married Alfonso Codorniu y Aguilar (born 24 April 1954) on 29 September 1982.
    - Jaime Codorniu y Alvarez de Toledo (born 15 February 1985)
    - Anna Codorniu y Alvarez de Toledo (born 24 January 1987)
    - Carla Codorniu y Alvarez de Toledo (born 5 July 1990)
  - Francisco de Borja Álvarez de Toledo y Marone-Cinzano, 9th Count of Villapaterna (born 26 March 1963), married Jill Schlanger (born 30 April 1957) on 25 July 1993.
    - Daniel Álvarez de Toledo y Schlanger (born 1995)
    - Jacobo Álvarez de Toledo y Schlanger (born 1997)
  - Marco Alfonso Álvarez de Toledo y Marone-Cinzano (born 23 January 1965), priest
  - Gonzalo Álvarez de Toledo y Marone-Cinzano (born 1 October 1973), married Aina Sainz y Vela. They have three sons.
- Donna Giovanna Paola Gabriella dei Conti Marone-Cinzano (born 31 January 1943), married Jaime Galobart y Satrústegui (born 4 February 1935) on 24 July 1967 and they were divorced in 1980. They have one son and three grandsons. She remarried Luis Ángel Sánchez-Merlo y Ruiz (born Valladolid, 10 October 1947) on 4 August 1989.
  - Alfonso Alberto Galobert y Marone-Cinzano (born 12 April 1969), married Alejandra Kindelán y Oteyza (born 12 September 1971) on 26 June 1998. They have three sons.
- Donna María Theresa Beatrice dei Conti Marone-Cinzano (born Lausanne, 4 January 1945), married in Geneva on 22 April 1967 and divorced in 1989 José María Ruiz de Arana y Montalvo (Madrid, 27 April 1933 – Madrid, 30 April 2004), 17th Duke of Baena, 17th Duke of Sanlúcar la Mayor, 15th Marquess of Villamanrique, 13th Marquess of Castromonte, 5th Marquess of Brenes, 11th Count of Sevilla La Nueva and 5th Viscount of Mamblas. They have three daughters and three grandchildren.
  - María Cristina Ruiz de Arana y Marone-Cinzano, 18th Duchess of Baena and 18th Duchess of Sanlúcar la Mayor (born 25 March 1968), married Ignacio Izuzquiza y Fernández (born 6 May 1970) in 2000. They have one daughter and one son.
  - Isabel Alfonsa Ruiz de Arana y Marone-Cinzano (born 17 May 1970)
  - Ines Ruiz de Arana y Marone-Cinzano (born 27 December 1973), 6th Marchioness of Brenes, married Carlos Magraner y Ubieta (born 1975) in 2008. They have one daughter.
- Donna Anna Alessandra (Anna Sandra) dei Conti Marone-Cinzano (born Turin, 21 December 1948), married Gian Carlo Stavro di Santarosa (born 25 May 1944) on 7 December 1968 and they were divorced in 1975. They have two daughters and one grandchild. She remarried Fernando Schwartz y Giron in 1985.
  - Astrid Christina Antonia Stavro di Santarosa (born 24 April 1972), married Pablo Martín y Badosa (born 1964). They have one son.
  - Yara Christiane Stavro di Santarosa (born 29 June 1974)

=== Death ===
Infanta Maria Cristina returned to Spain and spent periods of time there, but never lived there permanently. She died in Madrid of a heart attack on 23 December 1996 during a Christmas reunion of the royal family at the Villa Giralda, the residence of her cousin and sister-in-law, the Countess of Barcelona. A funeral service for the Infanta was held in the chapel of the Royal Palace of Madrid on 24 December and a burial service was held on 26 December in the Marone-Cinzano Pantheon in Turin.

== Honours ==
- Spain: 1,112th Dame Grand Cross of the Order of Queen Maria Luisa

== Arms ==
Heraldry of Infanta Maria Cristina of Spain

Coat of arms used before her marriage

Coat of arms used as Countess of Marone

Coat of arms used as Dowager in the exile

Coat of arms used during King Juan Carlos's reign

== Ancestry ==
Ancestors of Infanta María Cristina of Spain

8. Infante Francisco de Asís of Spain
4. Alfonso XII of Spain
9. Isabella II of Spain
2. Alfonso XIII of Spain
10. Archduke Karl Ferdinand of Austria
5. Archduchess Maria Christina of Austria
11. Archduchess Elisabeth Franziska of Austria
1. Infanta María Cristina of Spain
12. Prince Alexander of Hesse and by Rhine
6. Prince Henry of Battenberg
13. Countess Julia Hauke
3. Princess Victoria Eugenie of Battenberg
14. Prince Albert of Saxe-Coburg and Gotha
7. Princess Beatrice of the United Kingdom
15. Victoria of the United Kingdom
