= Christian Franzen (photographer) =

Danish photographer active in Spain

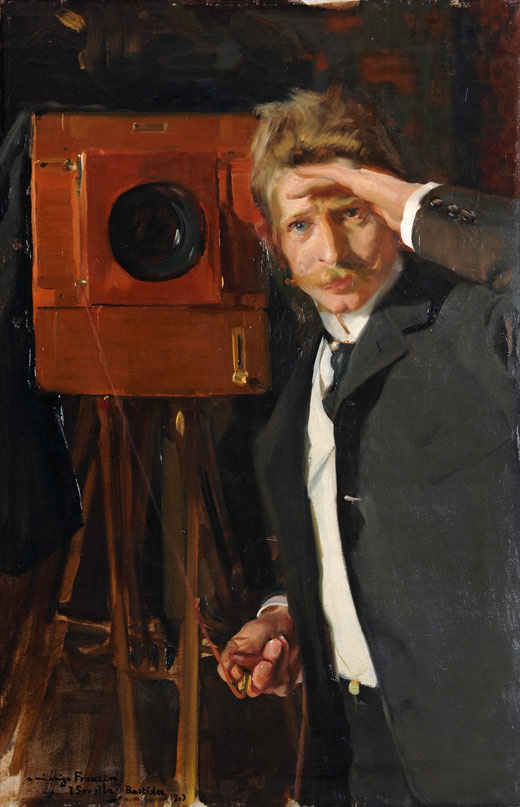
- Portait by Joaquín Sorolla, 1903
- Born: December 18, 1864; Viöl, Duchy of Schleswig
- Died: September 17, 1923 (aged 58); Madrid, Spain
- Burial place: Sacramental de San Lorenzo y San José
- Occupation: Photographer
- Years active: 1888–1923
- Era: Reign of Alfonso XIII
- Awards: Order of the Dannebrog (1912)

Christian Franzen Nissen (Note: In this Spanish name, the first or paternal surname is Franzen and the second or maternal family name is Nissen.) (18 December 1864 – 17 September 1923) was a Danish photographer and diplomat active in Spain. Franzen specialised in portrait photography and is credited for introducing magnesium flash powder photography to Spain.

At the turn of the 20th century, he had a photography studio on Calle del Príncipe in Madrid, where he photographed celebrities, politicians, and members of the Spanish aristocracy. Employed by the Spanish royal family, he reportedly self-styled as "Photographer of Kings and King of Photographers".

== Life in Denmark ==
Christian Franzen Nissen was born on 18 December 1863 in Viöl, which was then claimed by the Kingdom of Denmark. His parents, Andreas Martin Franzen and Elise Larsen, moved their family to Faxe in 1864 during the Second Schleswig War. Christian was one of five children. His father, Andreas, was a teacher.

By the age of 16, he had moved out of his family's home. As a young man, he worked as a telegraphist, before training in Copenhagen under Christian Neuhaus, a pioneer of photography in Denmark. At 18 years old, he left to study photography in Rome, Munich, and Paris.

He returned to Copenhagen and opened his studio, Atelier Français, in 1888. He closed his study and left for Italy in 1893, before moving to Spain.

== Career in Spain ==
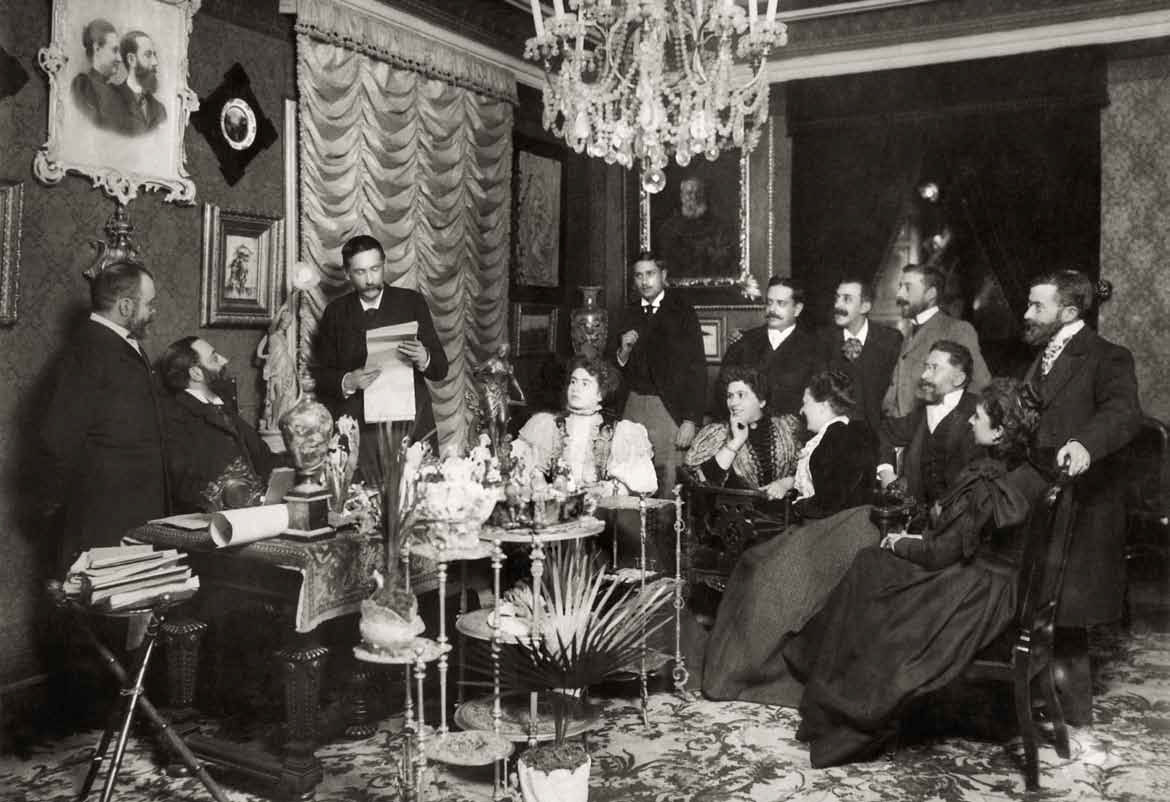
Benito Pérez Galdós reading a speech prepared for the Royal Spanish Academy, 1897

Franzen moved to Madrid in March 1893, where he promptly took a position with the Sociedad Artística Fotográfica (transl. Artistic Society of Photography). On 8 March 1897, he applied for a licence to open his studio on 11 Calle de Príncipe. The property was owned by the mother of José María de Garay y Rowart, a lawyer who would later become mayor of Madrid. With the future mayor's legal help, Franzen was able to formally open his business in 1897. His studio was just one of many that opened in Madrid at the turn of the 20th century, most of which could be found near Puerta del Sol, Calle de Alcalá, and Carrera de San Jerónimo.

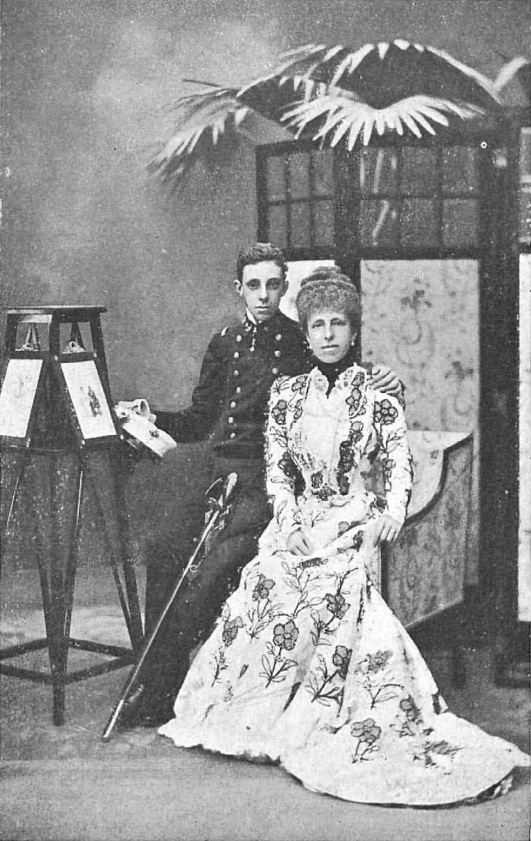
Portrait of Alfonso XIII and Maria Christina of Austria as published in Nuevo Mundo in 1901

Initially, he worked as a photojournalist, with his work published in illustrated magazines like Blanco y Negro, Nuevo Mundo, and La Ilustración Española y Americana. He also produced images for books, primarily those which related to court life and the cultural scene in Madrid, like the 1898 publication Los Salones de Madrid. Franzen had enmeshed himself within the Spanish aristocracy, through which he began a friendship with Queen Maria Christina of Austria. Through his connection to the queen, and his growing studio business, he began working for the Spanish royal family. On 7 July 1899, he was appointed as their official photographer, responsible for producing portraits and for documenting the royal family at official events. He and Kaulak were the only photographers permitted to sell official portraits of Maria Christina's son, King Alfonso XIII. Alongside Kaulak, Franzen became one of the most renowned portrait photographers in Spain at the turn of the 20th century.

His connection to the Royal family increased demand for his work from the aristocracy and caused his business to grow quickly. He opened his own printing house, Imprenta Artística Blass y Cía (transl. Blass & Co. Artistic Printing House), in 1903. His printing house published a number of illustrated periodicals, including Alma Española, Los Contemporáneos, and Cuento Semanal. Among the notable publications made by his business were the 1905 edition of Don Quixote and Elías Tormo's book on the Monastery of Saint Mary of Guadalupe, published in 1906.

On 26 October 1908, Franzen began serving as acting consul of Denmark in Spain. On 20 February 1910, he became an official diplomat and consul, a position which he held for the remainder of his life.

== Photographic technique ==
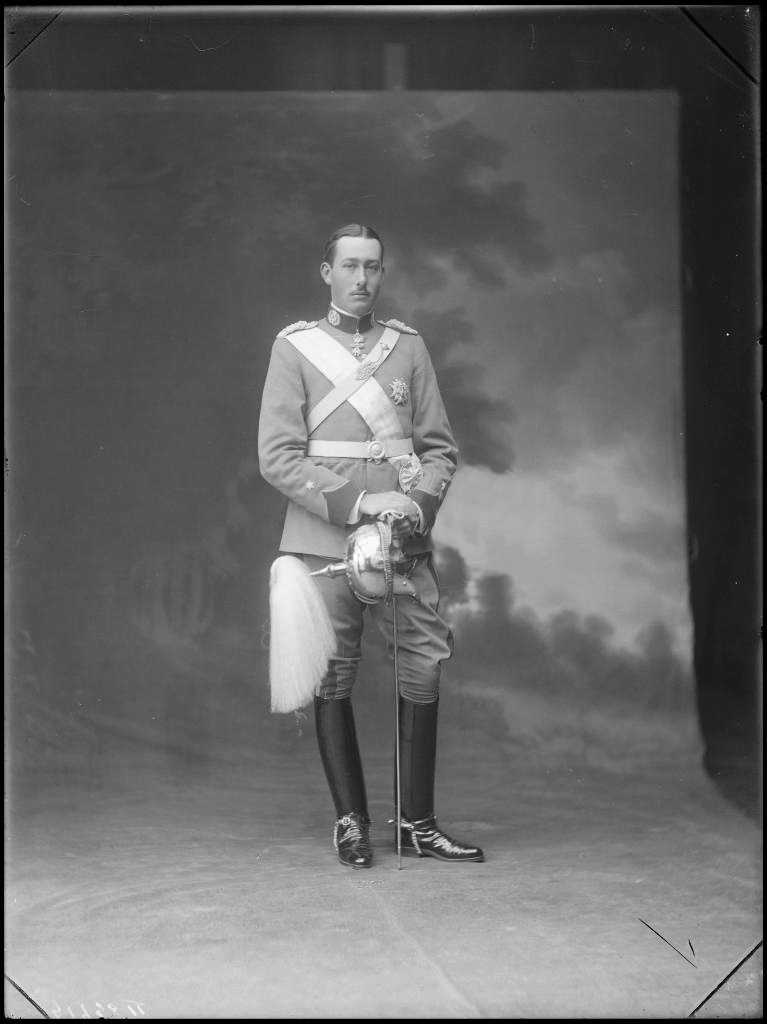
An untouched negative of Prince Gabriel of Bourbon-Two Sicilies, c. 1920

As an early pioneer of portrait photography, Franzen and his studio experimented with and developed new photographic processes. He is credited with introducing the use of magnesium flash powder photography to Spain. In January 1923, he registered a patent for a process that produced chiaroscuro effects on glass plate photographs.

His studio appears to have preferred working with pigment printing, though he was particularly famous for his gum printing, for which he had won an award at the 1910 Brussels International Exposition. The gelatin silver prints produced by his studio were often retouched manually with red and magenta inks, and the use of waxes and varnishes.

== Family and legacy ==
Franzen's partner, Leonie Estampes Guerrero was from Cier-de-Luchon, France and owned two guest houses in Madrid with her mother. Christian and Leonie had two daughters: Irma and María. Their eldest daughter, Irma, died in infancy on 19 February 1903. María, who was known as Mimí, had a son named Joaquín García Franzen. Christian Franzen Nissen died in Madrid on 17 September 1923 and was buried in Carabanchel at the Sacramental de San Lorenzo y San José. His grandson had died just months before in March.

His business was inherited by his daughter, Mimí, and his cousin, Poul Franzen. Through Mimí and Poul, the studio remained open until 1970. When the business closed, the entirety of its archive was sold off to RTVE, containing thousands of glass-plate negatives of his work. RTVE began digitising the 33,000 negatives in this collection in 2015. The collections of the Archivo General de Palacio also contain approximately 1,300 portraits created by his studio for the monarchy.

During his lifetime, Franzen received a number of awards and decorations. He won a gold medal at the 1900 Exposition Universelle. On 14 August 1912, he was decorated as a Knight of the Order of the Dannebrog.

== Gallery ==
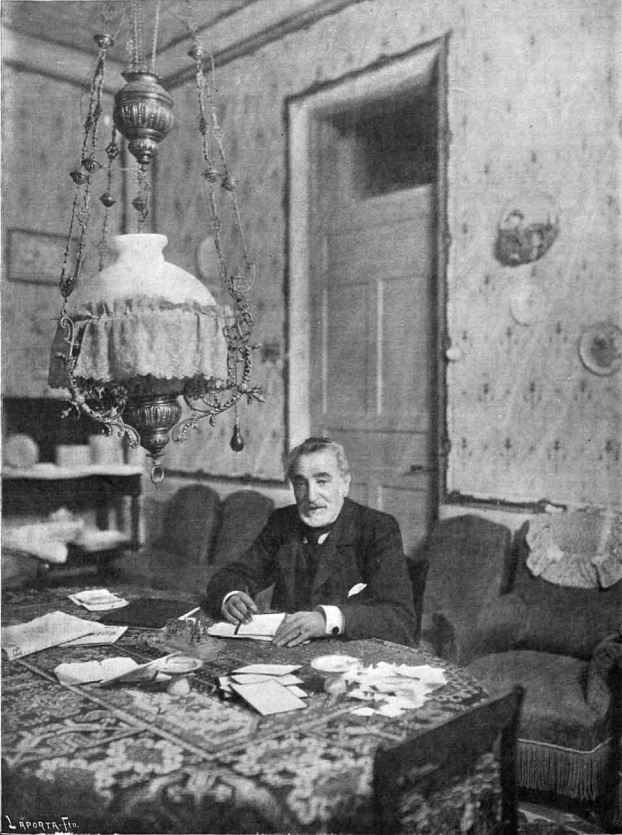
Práxedes Mateo Sagasta, 1897

En la escalera principal, saliendo de la Exposición, 1900

El ministro de Instrucción Pública y Bellas Artes dirigiendo la palabra a los invitados, 1900

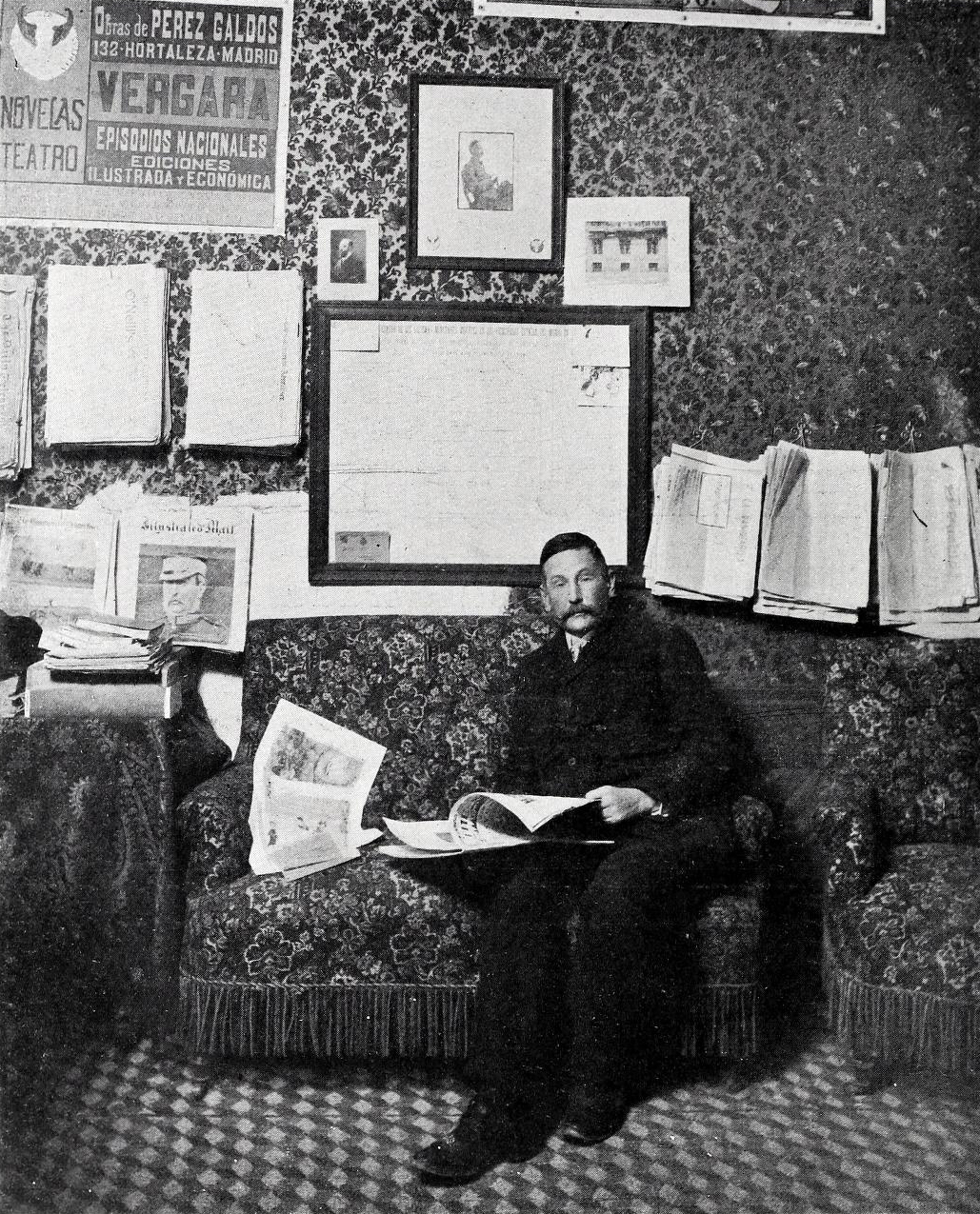
Benito Pérez Galdós, 1901

José Canalejas y Méndez and his son, 1901

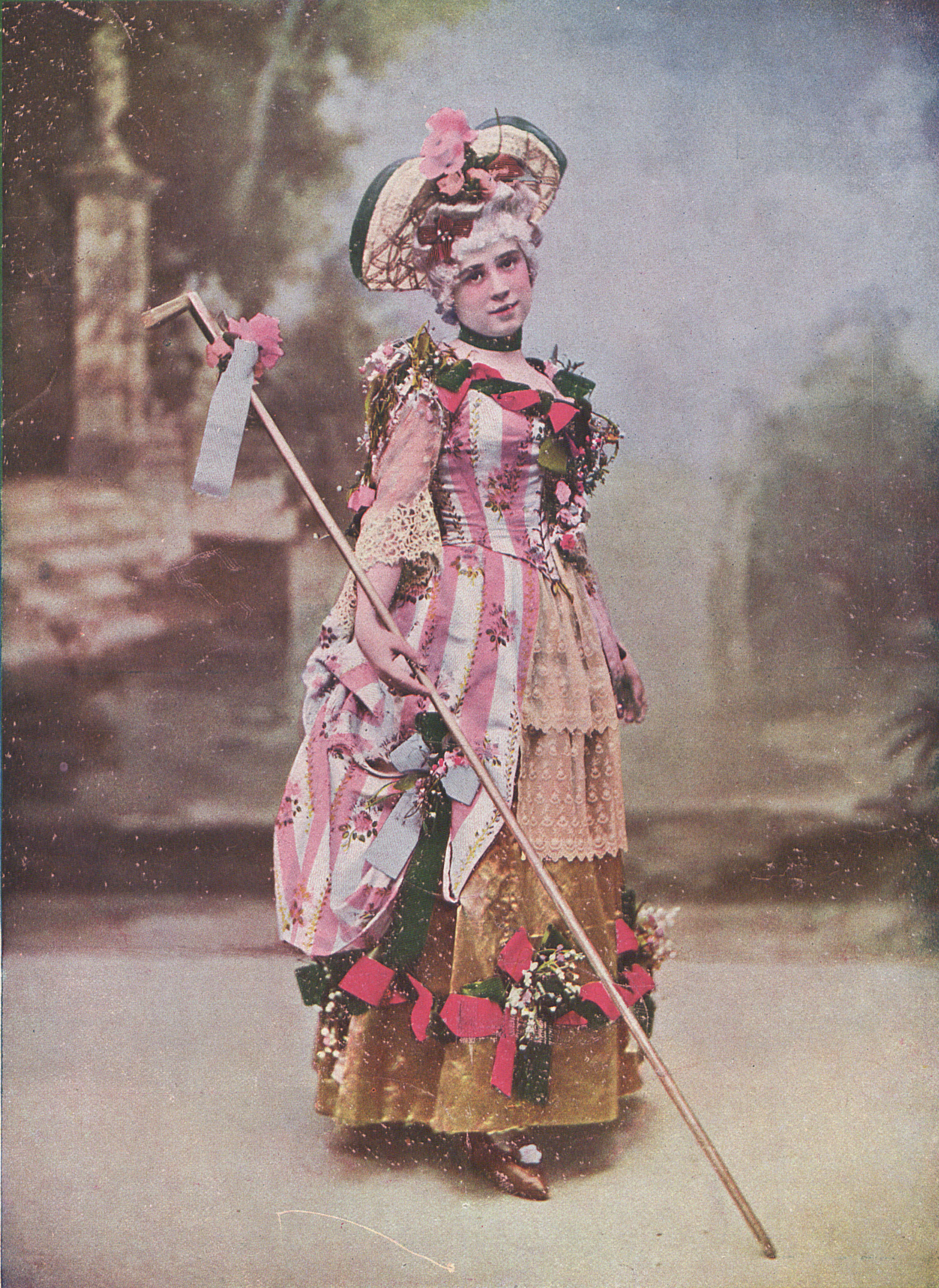
Matilde Moreno, 1902

Princess Pilar of Bavaria and Infanta María de la Paz of Spain, 1906

Victoria Eugenie of Battenberg, 1922

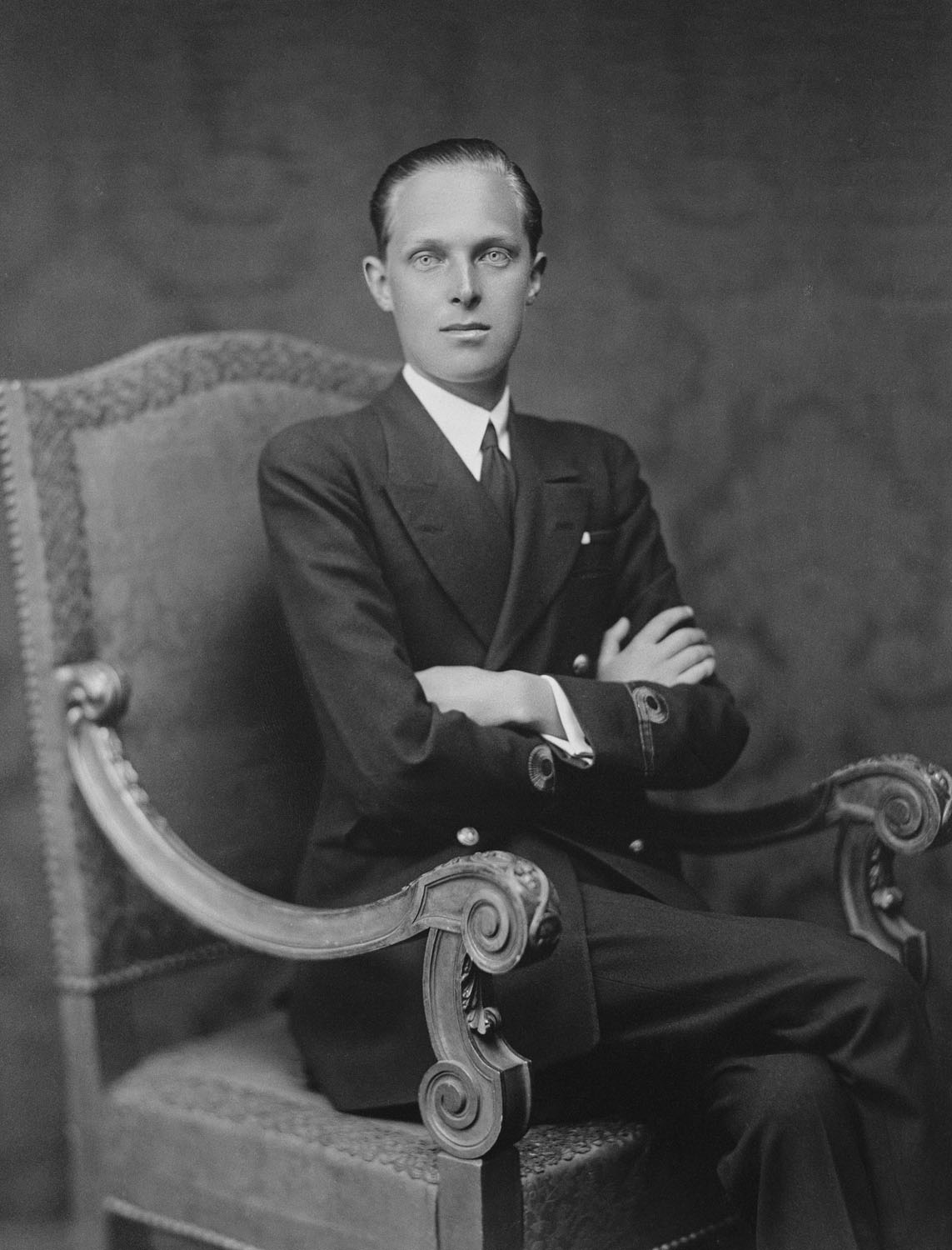
The Prince of Asturias, c. 1923
