= Victoria Eugenie of Battenberg =

Queen of Spain from 1906 to 1931

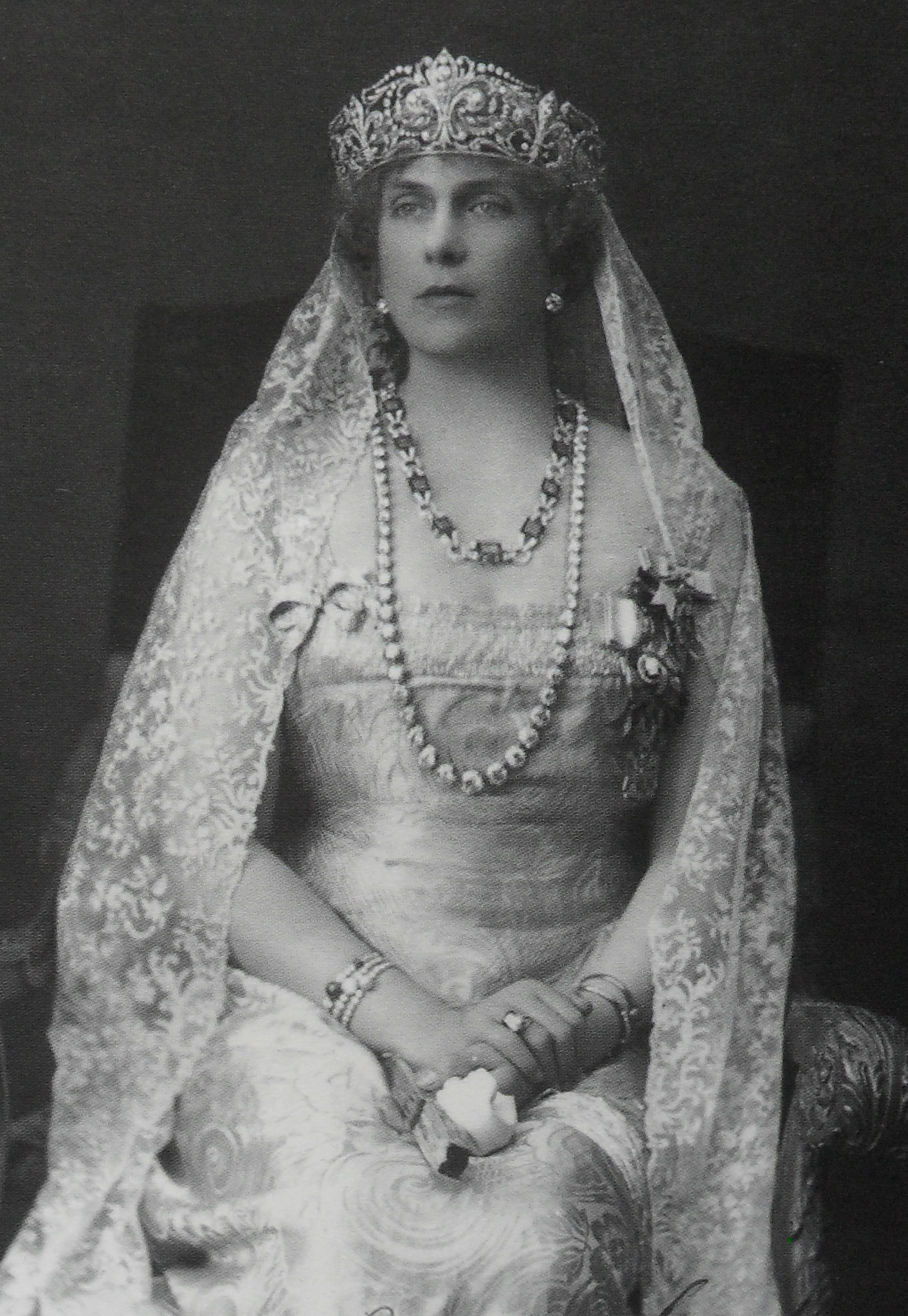
- Victoria Eugenie in 1922

Queen consort of Spain
- Tenure: 31 May 1906 – 14 April 1931
- Born: 24 October 1887; Balmoral Castle, Aberdeenshire, Scotland
- Died: 15 April 1969 (aged 81); Lausanne, Switzerland
- Burial: 18 April 1969; Sacré Coeur Catholic Church, Lausanne, Switzerland; 25 April 1985; El Escorial, Spain
- Spouse: Alfonso XIII (m. 1906)
- Issue: Alfonso, Prince of Asturias; Infante Jaime, Duke of Segovia; Infanta Beatriz, Princess of Civitella-Cesi; Infanta María Cristina, Countess Marone; Infante Juan, Count of Barcelona; Infante Gonzalo
Names
- Victoria Eugenie Julia Ena
- House: Battenberg
- Father: Prince Henry of Battenberg
- Mother: Princess Beatrice of the United Kingdom

Victoria Eugenie of Battenberg (Victoria Eugenie Julia Ena; (Note: Following her conversion to Roman Catholicism prior to her marriage to the King of Spain, she assumed the names Victoria Eugenia Cristina.) 24 October 1887 – 15 April 1969), commonly known as Ena, was Queen of Spain as the wife of King Alfonso XIII from their marriage on 31 May 1906 until 14 April 1931, when the Second Spanish Republic was proclaimed.

A princess of the Grand Duchy of Hesse by birth, she was a member of the Battenberg family, a morganatic branch of the House of Hesse-Darmstadt. She was the youngest granddaughter of Queen Victoria and Prince Albert of Saxe-Coburg and Gotha.

Unlike most members of the Battenberg family, who bore the lower ranking style of Serene Highness, Victoria Eugenie was born with the style of Highness, by virtue of a royal warrant issued by Queen Victoria in 1886. Prior to her marriage, she was elevated to the style of Royal Highness by her uncle, King Edward VII.

== Early life ==
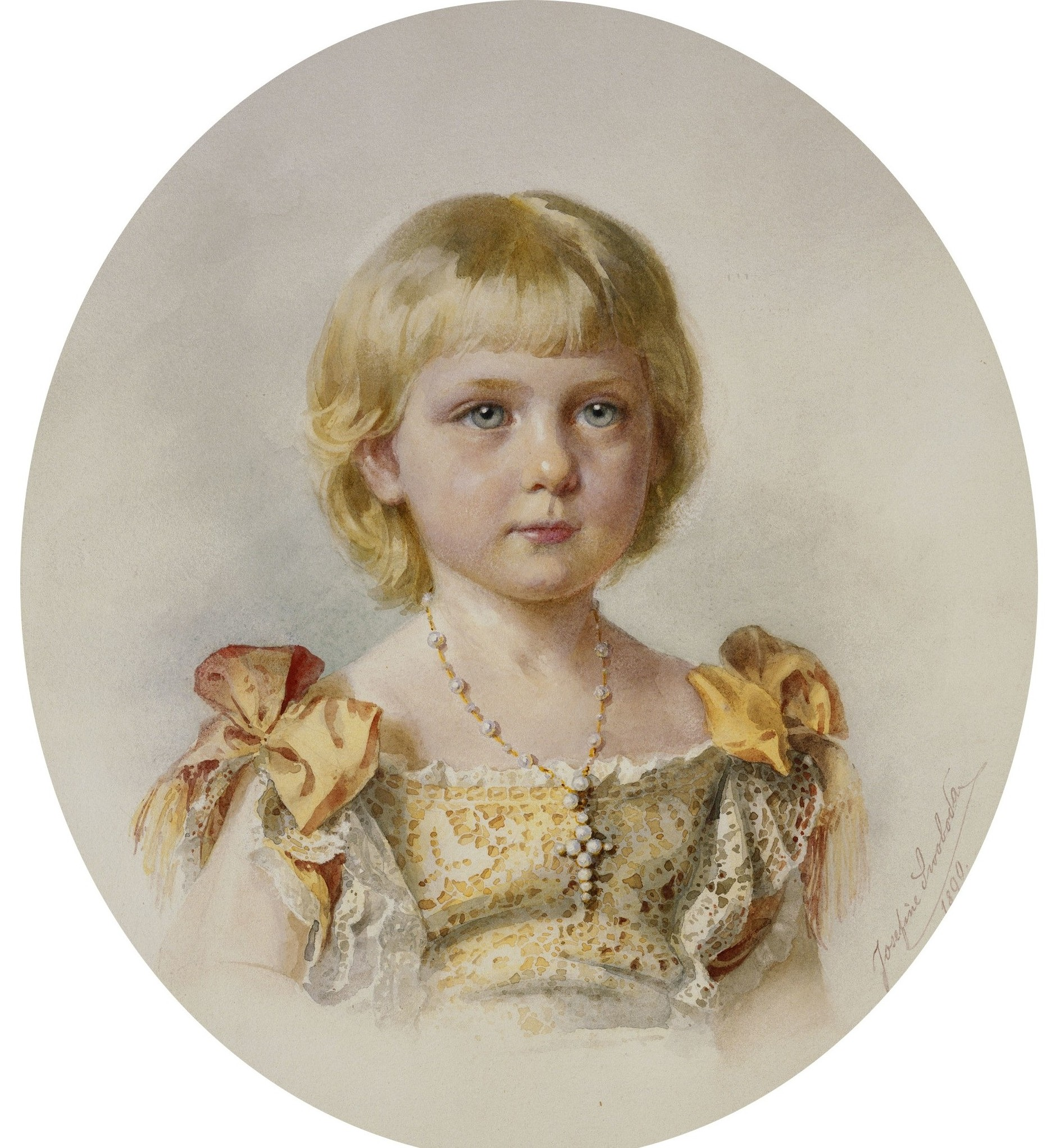
Portrait of Princess Ena as a child by Josefine Swoboda, 1890

Victoria Eugenie of Battenberg was born on 24 October 1887 at Balmoral Castle in Aberdeenshire, Scotland. Her father was Prince Henry of Battenberg, the fourth child and third son of Prince Alexander of Hesse and by Rhine and Julia, Princess of Battenberg, and her mother was Princess Beatrice, the fifth daughter of Queen Victoria of the United Kingdom and Prince Albert of Saxe-Coburg and Gotha. Her mother, as the youngest child of the lonely queen, was kept "at home" with the court, which happened to be at Balmoral when she went into labour. Victoria Eugenie was the last grandchild of a British monarch to be born in Scotland until Princess Margaret was born at Glamis Castle in Angus in August 1930.

As Prince Henry was the product of a morganatic marriage, he took his style of Prince of Battenberg from his mother, who had been created Princess of Battenberg in her own right. As such, Henry's children would normally have been born with the style "Serene Highness"; however, Queen Victoria had issued a Royal Warrant on 4 December 1886 granting the higher style of "Highness" to all sons and daughters of Prince Henry and Princess Beatrice, thus she was born Her Highness Princess Victoria Eugenie of Battenberg. To her family, and the British general public, she was known by a diminutive of the last of her names, as Ena. She was born in the 50th year of Queen Victoria's reign, so she was called "the Jubilee baby".

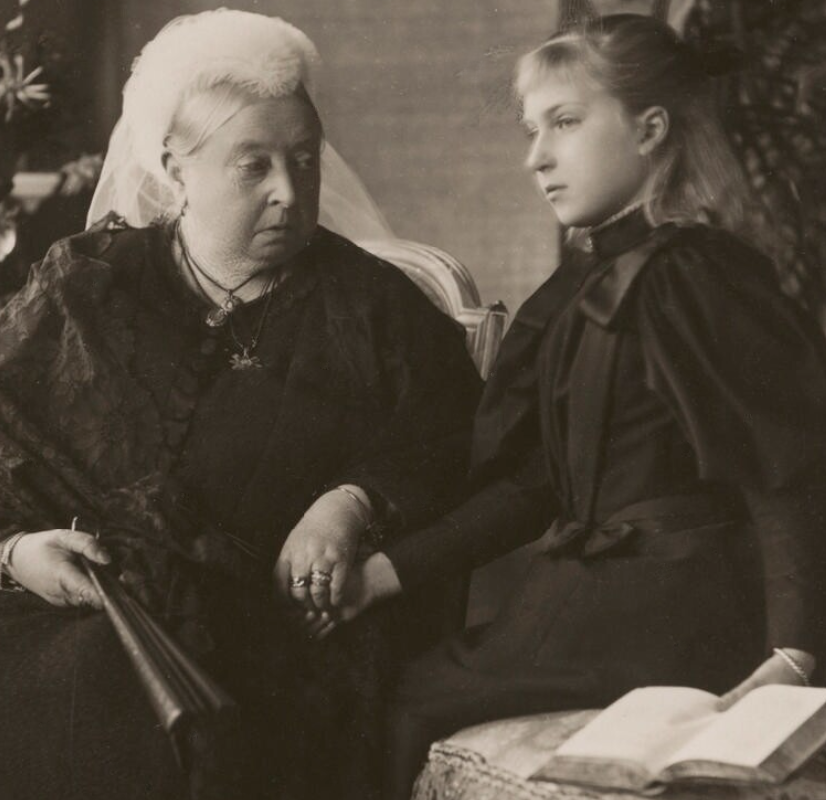
Ena with her grandmother Queen Victoria in 1897

She was baptised in the Drawing Room at Balmoral. Her godparents were Empress Eugénie (represented by Princess Frederica of Hanover), the German Crown Princess (her maternal aunt; represented by the Duchess of Roxburghe), the Princess of Battenberg (her paternal grandmother; represented by the Marchioness of Ely), Princess Christian of Schleswig-Holstein (her maternal aunt; represented by the Countess of Erroll), Prince Louis of Battenberg (her paternal uncle; represented by the Earl of Hopetoun) and the Duke of Edinburgh (her maternal uncle; represented by Sir Henry Ponsonby).

Ena grew up in Queen Victoria's household, as the British monarch had reluctantly allowed Beatrice to marry on the condition that she remain her mother's full-time companion and personal secretary. Therefore, she spent her childhood at Windsor Castle, Balmoral, and Osborne House on the Isle of Wight. She was a bridesmaid at the wedding of her cousins, the Duke (later King George V) and Duchess of York on 6 July 1893.

When she was six, Ena suffered a severe concussion when she was thrown off her pony at Osborne and hit her head on the ground. Queen Victoria's physicians noticed "dangerous symptoms", such as "evident signs of brain pressure, probably a haemorrhage". Her aunt Victoria, Princess Royal, wrote, "it is so grievous that [Ena] cannot take notice or open her eyes".

Ena was close to her grandmother Queen Victoria. She reflected that "having been born and brought up in her home, Queen Victoria was like a second mother to us. She was very kind but very strict, with old fashioned ideas of how children must be brought up". When Ena said, "I think it is time for us to go to bed", Queen Victoria corrected her. "Young woman, a princess should say, 'I think it is time for me to retire'. Queen Victoria wrote that "I love these darling children so, almost as much as their own parent" and referred to Ena as "the little treasure". Her father died while on active military service after contracting fever in Africa in 1896. After the death of Queen Victoria in 1901, her mother and her family moved out of Osborne House and took up residence in Kensington Palace in London. Princess Beatrice inherited Osborne Cottage on the Isle of Wight from her mother.

One of her closest friends was Lady Jean Cochrane.

== Engagement and wedding ==
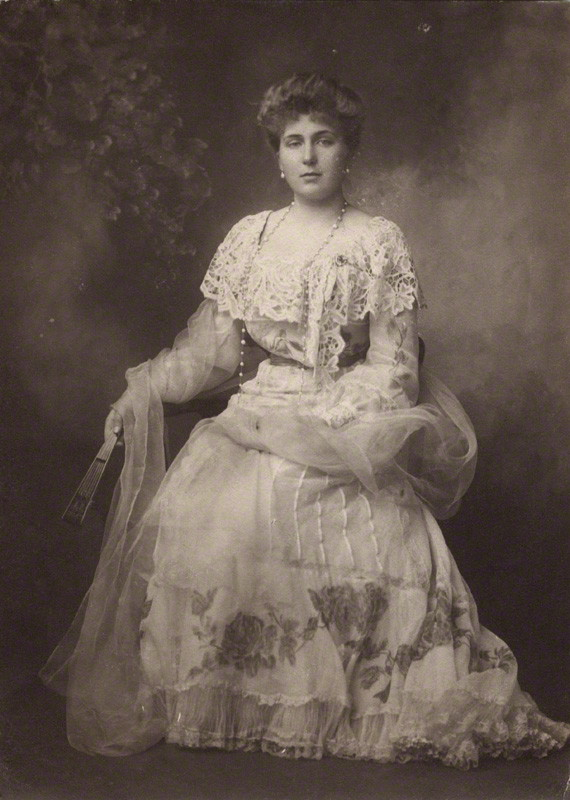
Princess Ena by George Charles Beresford, 1904

In 1905, King Alfonso XIII of Spain made an official state visit to the United Kingdom. Ena's maternal uncle, King Edward VII, hosted a dinner in Buckingham Palace in honour of the Spanish monarch. Alfonso was seated between Queen Alexandra and Princess Helena, King Edward's sister. He noticed Ena and asked who the dinner guest with almost white hair was. Everybody knew that King Alfonso was looking for a suitable bride and one of the strongest candidates was Princess Patricia of Connaught, another niece of King Edward. As Princess Patricia seemed not to be impressed by the Spanish monarch, Alfonso indulged his interest in Ena, and so the courtship began. When Alfonso returned to Spain he frequently sent postcards to Ena and spoke of her approvingly. His mother, Queen Maria Christina, did not like her son's choice, in part because she considered the Battenbergs non-royal because of the obscure origin of Prince Henry's mother, and in part because she wanted her son to marry within her own family. Other obstacles to a marriage were religion (Alfonso was Roman Catholic, and Ena was Anglican); and the potential problem of haemophilia, the disease that Queen Victoria had transmitted to some of her descendants. Ena's brother, Leopold, was a haemophiliac, so there was a 50% probability that she would be a carrier, although the degree of risk was not yet known. Still, if Alfonso married her, their issue could be affected by the disease. Nonetheless, Alfonso was not dissuaded.

After a year of rumours about which princess Alfonso would marry, his mother finally acceded to her son's selection in January 1906 and wrote a letter to Ena's mother, telling her about the love Alfonso felt for her daughter and seeking unofficial contact with the king. Some days later at Windsor, King Edward congratulated his niece on her future engagement.

Princess Beatrice and her daughter arrived in Biarritz on 22 January and stayed at the Villa Mauriscot where some days later King Alfonso met them. At the Villa Mauriscot, Alfonso and his future bride conducted a chaperoned, three-day romance. Then, Alfonso took Ena and her mother to San Sebastián to meet Queen Maria Christina. On 3 February, the king left San Sebastian to go to Madrid and Ena and her mother went to Versailles where the Princess would be instructed in the Catholic faith: as the future Queen of Spain, she agreed to convert. The official reception of Ena into the Catholic faith took place on 5 March 1906 at Miramar Palace in San Sebastián.

The terms of the marriage were settled by two agreements, a public treaty and a private contractual arrangement. The treaty was executed between Spain and the United Kingdom in London on 7 May 1906 by their respective plenipotentiaries, the Spanish Ambassador to the Court of St James's, Don Luis Polo de Bernabé, and the British Foreign Secretary, Sir Edward Grey, Bt. Ratifications were exchanged on 23 May following. Among other conditions, the treaty stipulated:

BE it known unto all men by these Presents that whereas His Catholic Majesty Alfonso XIII, King of Spain, has judged it proper to announce his intention of contracting a marriage with Her Royal Highness Princess Victoria Eugénie Julia Ena, niece of His Majesty Edward VII, King of the United Kingdom of Great Britain and Ireland and of the British Dominions beyond the Seas, Emperor of India, and daughter of Her Royal Highness the Princess Beatrice Mary Victoria Feodore (Princess Henry of Battenberg)…

Article I. It is concluded and agreed that the marriage between His said Majesty King Alfonso XIII and Her said Royal Highness the Princess Victoria Eugénie Julia Ena shall be solemnized in person at Madrid as soon as the same may conveniently be done.

II. His said Majesty King Alfonso XIII engages to secure to Her said Royal Highness the Princess Victoria Eugénie Julia Ena from the date of her marriage with His Majesty, and for the whole period of the marriage, an annual grant of 450,000 pesetas. His said Majesty King Alfonso XIII also engages, if, by the will of Divine Providence, the said Princess Victoria Eugénie Julia Ena should become his widow, to secure to her, from the date of his death, an annual grant of 250,000 pesetas, unless and until she contracts a second marriage, both these grants having already been voted by the Cortes. The private settlements to be made on either side in regard to the said marriage will be agreed upon and expressed in a separate Contract, which shall, however, be deemed to form an integral part of the present Treaty…

III. The High Contracting Parties take note of the fact that Her Royal Highness the Princess Victoria Eugénie Julia Ena, according to the due tenor of the law of England, forfeits for ever all hereditary rights of succession to the Crown and Government of Great Britain…

The treaty's reference to the forfeiture of Ena's British succession rights reflected neither any British government censure of the alliance nor any renunciation made by her. Rather, it was an explicit recognition of the fact that by marrying (and becoming) a Roman Catholic, Ena lost any right to inherit the British crown as a consequence of Britain's Act of Settlement 1701. This exclusion was personal and limited: those among her descendants who do not become Roman Catholic remain in the line of succession to the British Throne.

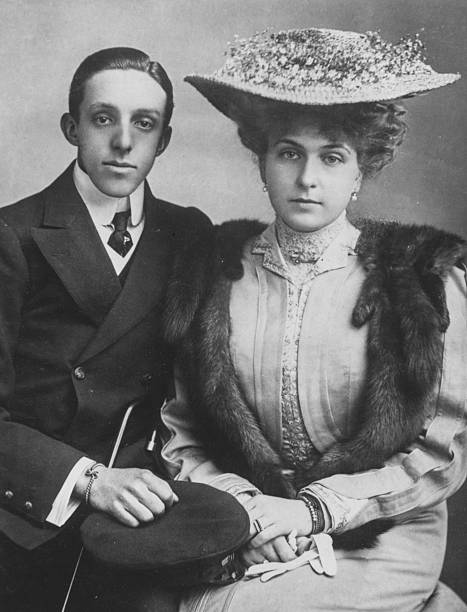
Ena with her fiancé King Alfonso XIII of Spain in 1906

Despite this treaty, concern about the reaction to the marriage and to Ena's conversion among Protestants was accommodated by the British government's decision that King Edward need not grant official consent to the marriage in his Privy Council, despite the fact that his niece was a British subject. Although the Royal Marriages Act 1772 requires that descendants of King George II obtain the British sovereign's prior permission to marry by Order in Council, an exception exists for descendants of royal daughters who marry "into foreign families". Although the naturalisation of Ena's father in the United Kingdom had been initiated in Parliament a week prior to his marriage to Princess Beatrice, the nuptials were completed before the naturalisation, thus the government was able to take the position that Ena was not bound by the Royal Marriages Act 1772, and therefore the British king had legal authority neither to authorise nor forbid her marriage.

The king did, however, issue a royal warrant which read:

"Our Will and Pleasure is and we do hereby declare and ordain that from and after the date of this Warrant our Most Dear Niece Princess Victoria Eugénie Julia Ena, only daughter of Our Most Dear Sister Beatrice Mary Victoria Feodore (Princess Henry of Battenberg) shall be styled entitled and called Her Royal Highness before her name and such Titles and Appellations which to her belong in all Deeds Records Instruments or Documents whatsoever wherein she may at any time hereafter be named or described. And We do hereby authorize and empower Our said Most Dear Niece henceforth at all times to assume and use and to be called and named by the Style, Title and Appellation of Her Royal Highness accordingly. Given at Our Court of Saint James's, the Third day of April 1906: in the Sixth Year of Our Reign. By His Majesty's Command. M Gladstone"

Notice of this warrant was gazetted in the London Gazette which read:

"Whitehall 3 April 1906. The KING has been graciously pleased to declare and ordain that His Majesty's niece, Her Highness Princess Victoria Eugenie Julia Ena, daughter of Her Royal Highness the Princess Beatrice Mary Victoria Feodore (Princess Henry of Battenberg), shall henceforth be styled and called 'Her Royal Highness'; And to command that the said Royal concession and declaration be registered in His Majesty's College of Arms."

Princess Ena married King Alfonso XIII at the Royal Monastery of San Jerónimo in Madrid on 31 May 1906. Present at the ceremony were her widowed mother and brothers, as well as her cousins, the Prince and Princess of Wales.

After the wedding ceremony, as the royal procession was heading back to the Royal Palace, an assassination attempt was made on the King and Queen when anarchist Mateu Morral threw a bomb from a balcony at the royal carriage; this incident would become known as the Morral affair. Ena's life was saved because, at the exact moment the bomb exploded, she turned her head in order to see St. Mary's Church, which Alfonso was showing her. She escaped injury, although her dress was spotted with the blood of a guard who was riding beside the carriage. A large statue in front of the Royal Monastery of San Jeronimo commemorates the victims of the bombing of 31 May 1906.

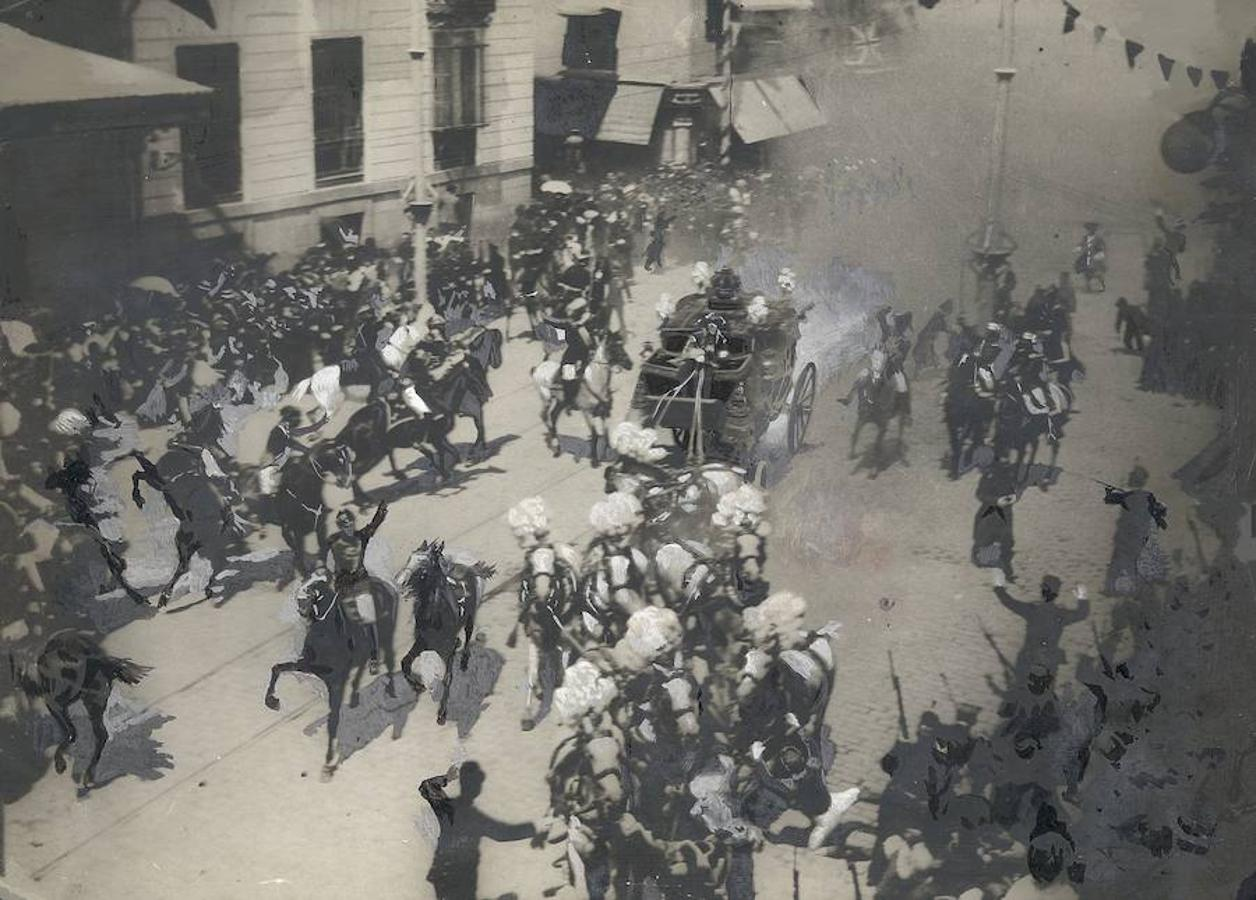
Photograph of the assassination attempt on King Alfonso XIII and Ena at the moment of the bomb's explosion

Later, Spanish composer Fernando Moraleda Bellver wrote a song about the attack:

Wedding song of King Alfonso XIII and Ena (Translation in English)

The king marries and the people go wild, because it's customary and the king deserves it.
His bride, with a Spanish venia and an English coat of arms, is Doña Victoria Eugenia.
They look at the two, happy and in love, saying goodbye, to both sides.
A worshipper of a spring sun, love goes to the palace
and a criminal hand stops the royal entourage on the main street.
It was a bomb, thrown by Morral, among red roses, from a sad rose garden.

King Alfonso, King of Spain, you know that Madrid loves you.
Tell this one who accompanies you, who is our queen and lady,
to forgive the flowers, for their immeasurable wickedness,
and that my best roses are at her side
Forgive the ermine, which was stained with blood.
The affection was great, and mourning was sown.

== Queen of Spain ==
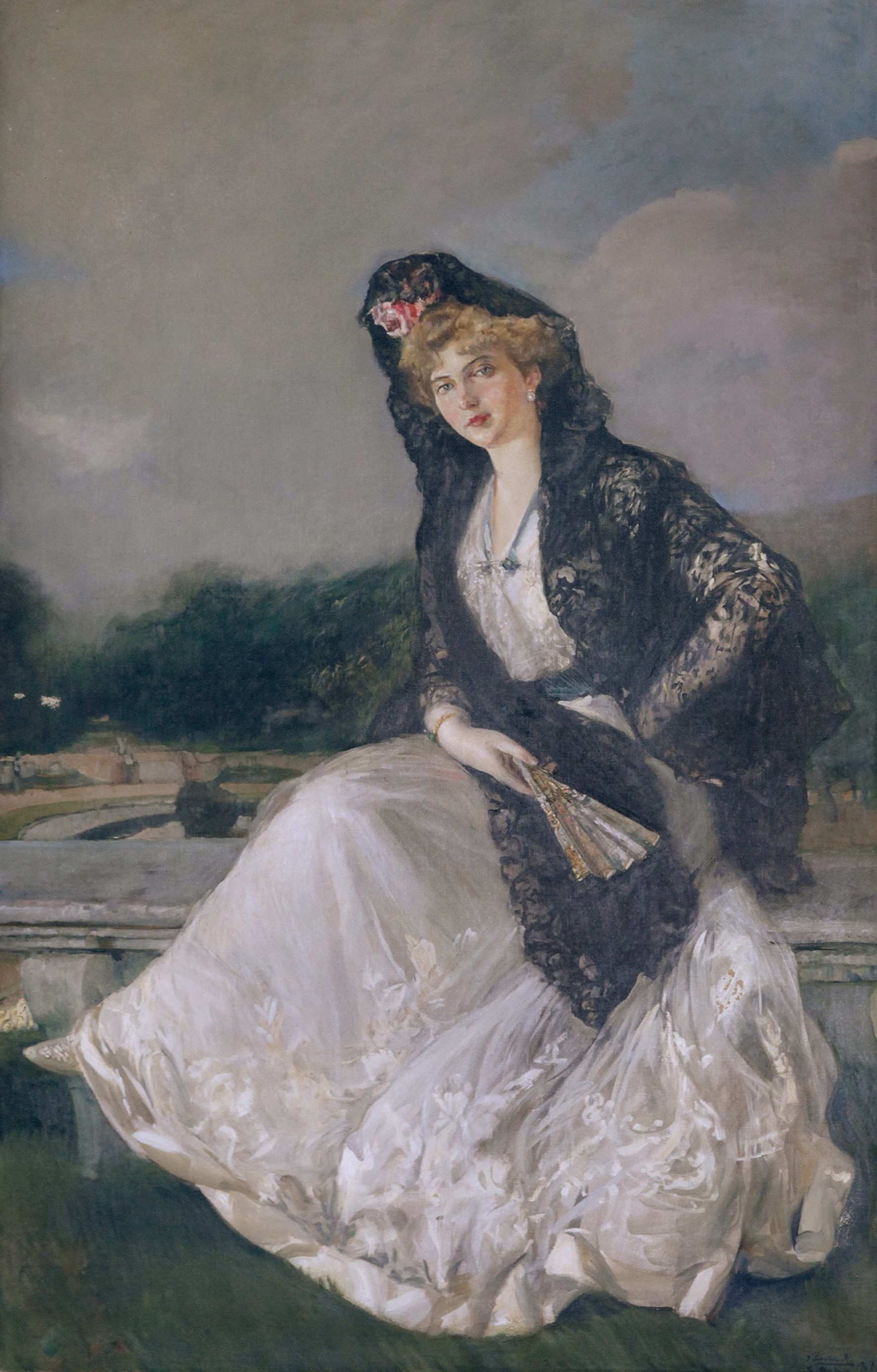
Portrait of Queen Ena wearing a Spanish mantilla by Joaquín Sorolla, 1910

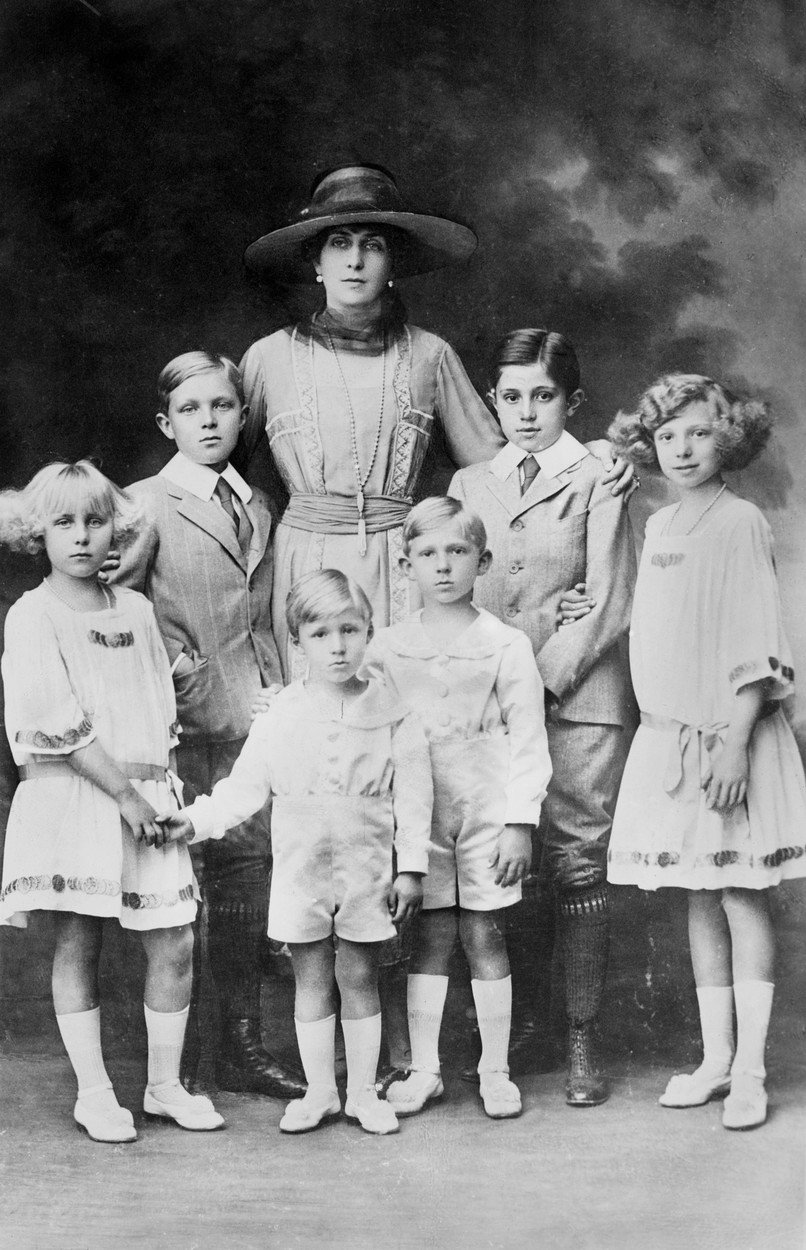
Queen Ena, in 1918, with her six children: (from left to right) Infanta Maria Cristina, Alfonso, Prince of Asturias, Infante Gonzalo, Infante Juan, Infante Jaime and Infanta Beatriz

After the inauspicious start to her tenure as Queen of Spain, Ena became isolated from the Spanish people and was unpopular in her new land. Her married life improved when she gave birth to a son and heir apparent to the kingdom, Alfonso, Prince of Asturias. However, while the baby prince was being circumcised, the doctors noted that he did not stop bleeding — the first sign that the infant heir had haemophilia. Ena was the obvious source of the condition, which was inherited by her eldest and youngest sons. Contrary to the response of Emperor Nicholas II of Russia, whose son and heir by another granddaughter of Queen Victoria was similarly afflicted, Alfonso is alleged never to have forgiven Ena nor to have come to terms with what had happened. In all, King Alfonso XIII and Queen Ena had seven children, five sons and two daughters. Neither of their daughters is known to have been a carrier of haemophilia.

After the births of their children, Ena's relationship with Alfonso deteriorated, and he had numerous affairs. It has been said that he had a dalliance with the Queen's cousin, Beatrice, Duchess of Galliera, but this is disputed. Then members of the king's circle spread rumours that Beatrice had been expelled because of her bad behaviour, which was not true. All this situation was very painful for the Queen, who could do nothing to help her cousin.

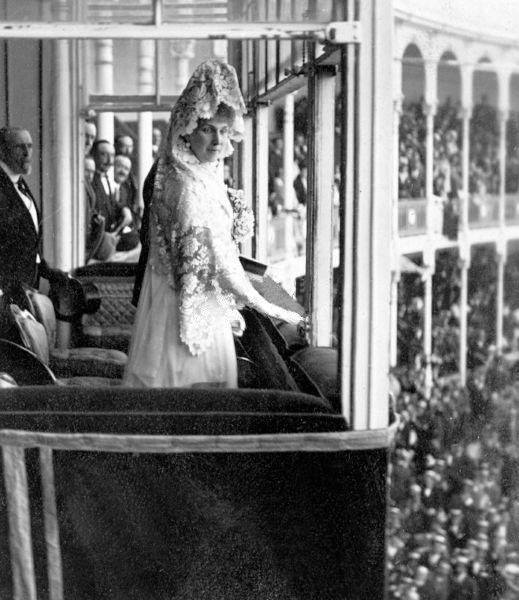
Queen Ena attending a bull fight, c. 1910

Ena disliked Spanish religious conservatism and the customs of the Royal Court, such as bullfighting, describing it as a cruel spectacle typical of a backward people like the Spanish. Later she confided to her grandson Juan Carlos's then-fiancée, Princess Sofía of Greece and Denmark, that she was forced to attend and pretend to enjoy bullfights. When the Greek princess replied that no one would force her to watch bullfights, Ena replied: "You can't refuse, they will force you". Feeling increasingly isolated, Ena turned to her passion for collecting jewellery.

Ena also devoted herself to work for hospitals and services for the poor, as well as to education. Besides, she was involved in the reorganization of the Spanish Red Cross. In 1929, the city of Barcelona erected a statue of her in a nurse's uniform in honour of her Red Cross work (the statue has since been destroyed).

Various Spanish landmarks have been named after Ena. For instance, in 1909, Madrid's stately neoclassical bridge crossing the Manzanares River was named after her as the "Puente de la Reina Victoria". In 1912, the monumental opera house and theatre "Teatro Victoria Eugenia" in San Sebastián, Spain, was named after her. In 1920, she launched the Spanish Navy cruiser Reina Victoria Eugenia which was named after her.

She was the 976th Dame of the Royal Order of Queen Maria Luisa. In 1923, the Pope conferred upon her the Golden Rose which was the first time this honour had been awarded to a British princess since 1555 when Pope Julius III conferred one upon Queen Mary I of England. She was also granted the Royal Order of Victoria and Albert by her grandmother, Queen Victoria. The Queen was also awarded the Spanish Red Cross Merit Order (First Class) and the jewelled breast star was paid for by a subscription undertaken by the Corps of Lady Nurses of the Spanish Red Cross.

== Exile and death ==
The Spanish royal family went into exile on 14 April 1931 after municipal elections brought Republicans to power in most of the major cities, leading to the proclamation of the Second Spanish Republic. Alfonso XIII had hoped that his voluntary exile might avert a civil war between the Republicans and the Monarchists. The family went to live in France and later Italy. Ena and Alfonso later separated, and she lived partly in the UK and in Switzerland. She purchased a chateau, the Vieille Fontaine, outside Lausanne. A soccer enthusiast, Ena frequently attended matches and in exile received the Real Madrid delegation in Vieille Fontaine.

In 1938, the whole family gathered in Rome for the baptism at the Palazzo Malta of Alfonso and Ena's son Juan's eldest son, Juan Carlos, by Vatican Cardinal Secretary of State Eugenio Pacelli (who stood in for the dying Pope Pius XI and would himself become Pope Pius XII in a few months). On 15 January 1941, Alfonso, feeling his death was near, transferred his rights to the Spanish crown to his son, the Count of Barcelona. On 12 February, Alfonso suffered a first heart attack and died on 28 February 1941. In 1942, Ena was obliged to leave Italy, having become persona non grata to the Italian government, according to Harold H. Tittmann Jr., a U.S. representative at the Vatican at the time, for her "ill-disguised leanings to the Allied cause".

Ena returned briefly to Spain in February 1968, to stand as godmother at the baptism of her great-grandson, Infante Felipe, the son of Infante Juan Carlos and Infanta Sofía. Felipe became King of Spain after his father, King Juan Carlos I, abdicated in June 2014.

Ena Eugenie died in Lausanne on 15 April 1969, aged 81, exactly 38 years after she had left Spain for exile. She was the last surviving child of Princess Beatrice and Prince Henry of Battenberg. The funeral was held in the church of Sacré Coeur, and she was buried in the nearby cemetery, Bois-de-Vaux in Lausanne. On 25 April 1985, her remains were returned to Spain and re-interred in the Royal Vault in the Escorial, outside Madrid, next to the remains of her husband, Alfonso XIII, and not far from her sons, Infante Alfonso, Infante Jaime, and Infante Gonzalo.

== Legacy ==
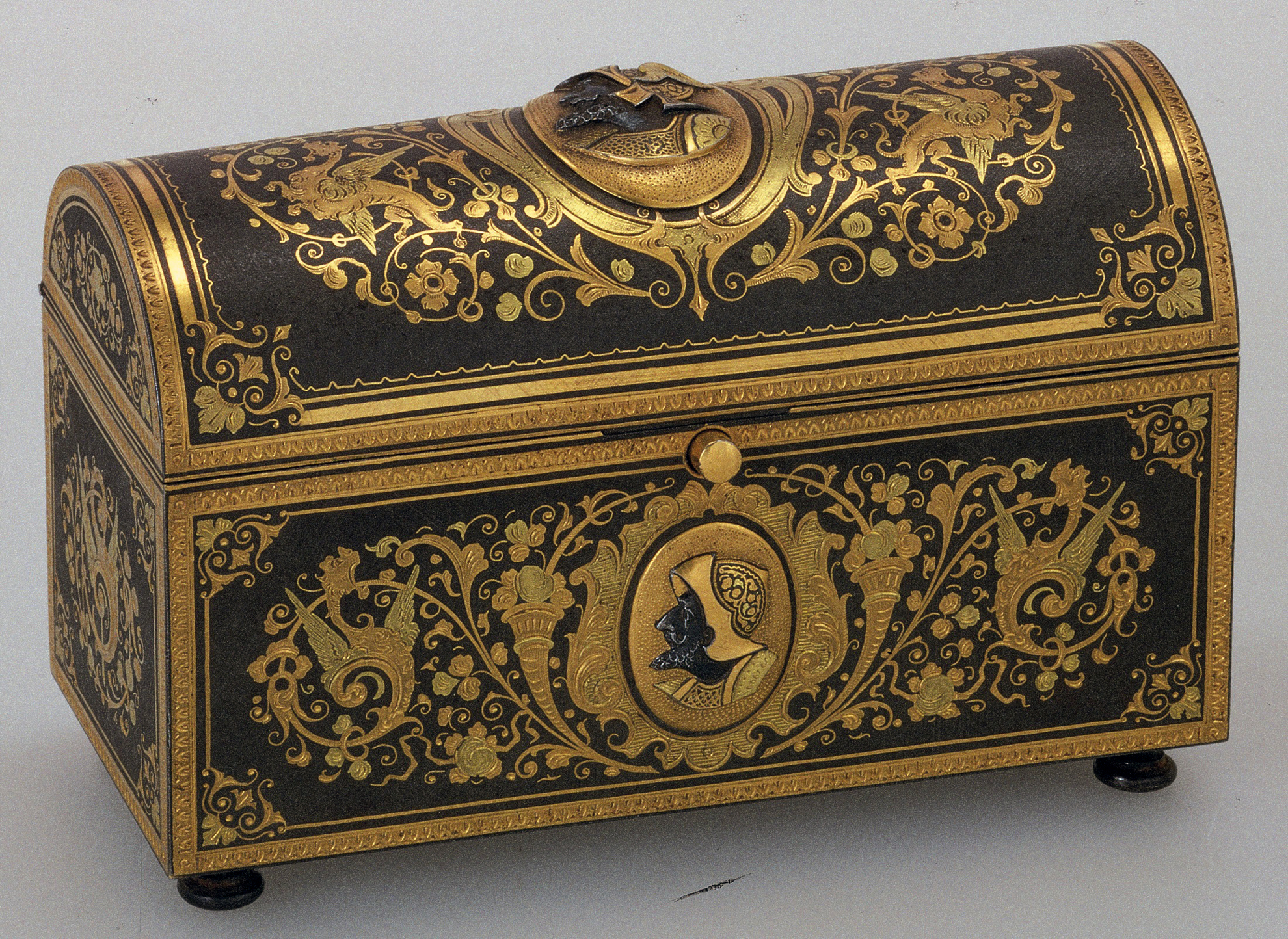
Domed damascened box from Toledo containing Ena's visiting card

After the death of Spanish dictator Francisco Franco in 1975, the monarchy was restored and Ena's grandson, Juan Carlos I, became King of Spain; her great-grandson, Felipe VI, is the current king. Her godchildren included the Prince of Monaco, Queen Fabiola of Belgium, and Cayetana Fitz-James Stuart, 18th Duchess of Alba.

Ena left eight important pieces of jewellery written in her will that, following her instructions, would be transmitted privately to the head of the royal family successively to be worn by the following queens of Spain. The jewellery collection, known as the joyas de pasar, includes her Ansorena fleur-de-lis tiara given to her by Alfonso XIII as a wedding gift in addition to other wedding gift jewellery from the King. She left her other jewels to be distributed between her daughters Infanta Beatriz and Infanta María Cristina –who received Victoria Eugenie's Cartier tiara of diamonds set with pearls (or alternatively with emeralds)–. This tiara and other family jewels were added to the joyas de pasar collection later. The jewels in the collection are currently the most important of the royal family and are worn by the queen on solemn occasions.

A sapphire ring owned by Ena was sold at Sotheby's in May 2012 for $50,000. That same year, Sotheby's also sold at auction Victoria Eugenie's diamond and pink conch shell bracelet by Cartier for $3.4 million.

In 2025, a Spanish series called Ena. Queen Victoria Eugenia was released in Finland, Portugal and Spain. Also, in December that year, Patrimonio Nacional opened a temporary exhibition (from December 2025 to April 2026) at the Royal Collections Gallery about the queen, with books, dresses, jewelry, letters and portraits, among others.

== Honours and arms ==
=== Orders and decorations ===
- Dame and Sovereign of the Order of Noble Ladies of Queen Maria Luisa (Spain, 1906).
- Grand Cross of the Imperial Austrian Order of Elizabeth (Austria, 1908).
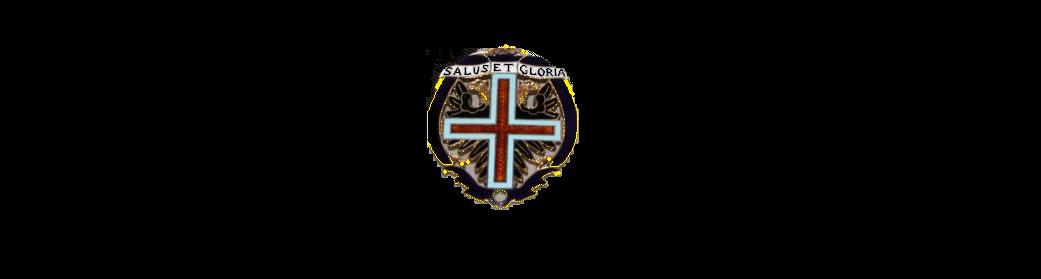
- Dame of the Order of the Starry Cross (Austria).
- Grand Cross of the Order of Saint-Charles (Monaco, 19 April 1958).

=== Arms ===
Coat of arms of Victoria Eugenie of Battenberg
Notes Victoria Eugenie's coat of arms as Queen of Spain (1906-1931/1941, titular) were the former Lesser Royal Coat of Arms of Spain used by the House of Bourbon, impaled with the Royal Coat of Arms of the United Kingdom (in the English version), overall an inescutcheon with the arms of her father Prince Henry of Battenberg; quarterly 1st and 4th, Hesse (modified), 2nd and 3rd, Battenberg. Prince Henry's arms modified by a bordure charged with the lions of England (eight). Escutcheon quarterly, first and fourth Gules, a three towered castle Or, masoned Sable and ajouré Azure (for Castile), second and third Argent, a lion rampant Purpure (blazoned Gules) crowned Or (for León), enté en point; Argent, a pomegranate proper seeded Gules, supported, sculpted and leafed in two leaves Vert (for Granada), overall an inescutcheon Azure, three fleurs-de-lys Or (for Bourbon); impaled with quarterly, first and fourth Gules three lions passant gardant in pale Or armed and langued Azure (for England), second quarter Or a lion rampant within a double tressure flory-counter-flory Gules (for Scotland), third quarter Azure a harp Or stringed Argent (for Ireland), overall an inescutcheon quarterly, first and fourth Azure a lion rampant barry of ten argent and gules, armed or a bordure compony Argent and Gules (for Hesse, modified), second and third Argent, two pallets Sable (for Battenberg), a bordure Gules charged with eight lions passant gardant Or armed and langued Azure (for England).

=== Other versions ===
Coat of arms used as Highness (Before 1906)

Coat of arms as UK Royal Highness (1906)

Royal Monogram as Queen of Spain

Coat of arms as widow (1941–1969)

== Children ==
Name	Birth	Death	Notes
Alfonso, Prince of Asturias	10 May 1907	6 September 1938 (aged 31)	He renounced rights to the Spanish throne for himself and his descendants (because of his intended unequal marriage) on 11 June 1933; m. 1st 1933 (div. 1937) Edelmira Ignacia Adriana Sampedro-Robato (5 March 1906 – 23 May 1994); m. 2nd 1937 (div. 1938) Marta Esther Rocafort-Altuzarra (18 September 1913 – 4 February 1993). He died in a car crash in 1938.
Infante Jaime, Duke of Segovia	23 June 1908	20 March 1975 (aged 66)	He renounced rights to the Spanish throne (because of his physical infirmities) on 21 June 1933. He married Donna Emmanuelle de Dampierre on 4 March 1935 and they were divorced on 6 May 1947, and had issue. He remarried Charlotte Tiedemann on 3 August 1949.
Infanta Beatriz of Spain	22 June 1909	22 November 2002 (aged 93)	She married Alessandro Torlonia, 5th Prince of Civitella-Cesi on 14 January 1935, and had issue.
Infante Fernando	21 May 1910	21 May 1910 (aged 0)	stillborn
Infanta María Cristina of Spain	12 December 1911	23 December 1996 (aged 85)	She married Enrico Eugenio Marone-Cinzano, 1st Count Marone on 10 June 1940, and had issue.
Infante Juan, Count of Barcelona	20 June 1913	1 April 1993 (aged 79)	He was recognised as heir apparent to the Spanish throne and held the title Prince of Asturias. He married Princess María de las Mercedes of Bourbon-Two Sicilies on 12 October 1935, and had issue (including Juan Carlos I of Spain).
Infante Gonzalo	24 October 1914	13 August 1934 (aged 19)	also a haemophiliac. He died in a car accident in Austria.

== Sources ==
- Avrich, Paul (1980). "The Martyrdom of Ferrer". The Modern School Movement: Anarchism and Education in the United States. Princeton: Princeton University Press. pp. 3–33. ISBN 0-691-04669-7. OCLC 489692159.
- Balansó, Juan (1992). La familia real y la familia irreal (in Spanish). Barcelona: Ed. Planeta. ISBN 84-320-7549-3.
- Gelardi, Julia P (2005). Born to Rule: Five Reigning Consorts, Granddaughters of Queen Victoria. ISBN 978-0-312-32423-0.
- Moreno Luzón, Javier (2023). El rey patriota. Alfonso XIII y la nación. Barcelona: Galaxia Gutenberg. ISBN 978-84-19392-11-4.
- Noel, Gerard (1990). Ena: Spain's English Queen (Biography and Memoirs). Constable. ISBN 978-0094692305.

Victoria Eugenie of Battenberg House of Battenberg Cadet branch of the House of Hesse-Darmstadt Born: 24 October 1887 Died: 15 April 1969
Spanish royalty
Vacant Title last held by Maria Christina of Austria	Queen consort of Spain; 31 May 1906 – 14 April 1931	Vacant Title next held by Sofía of Greece and Denmark
Titles in pretence
Loss of title	— TITULAR — Queen consort of Spain; 14 April 1931 – 15 January 1941	Succeeded by Princess María de las Mercedes of Bourbon-Two Sicilies
Preceded by Infanta Maria das Neves of Portugal	— TITULAR — Queen consort of France; Legitimist; 29 September 1936 – 28 February 1941	Succeeded by Emmanuelle de Dampierre
