= Edelmira, Countess of Covadonga =

Edelmira Sampedro-Ocejo y Robato
- Countess of Covadonga
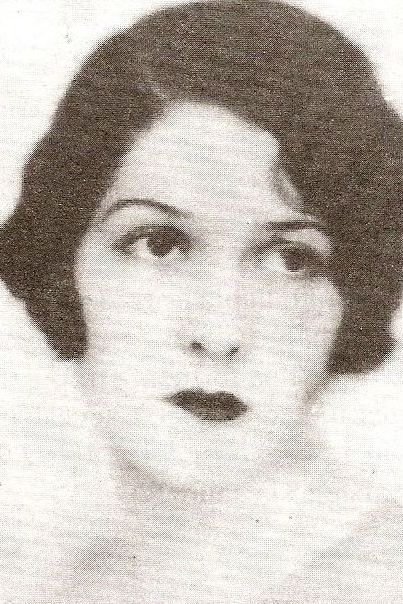
- Edelmira in 1933
- Born: 5 March 1906; Sagua La Grande, Cuba
- Died: 23 May 1994 (aged 88); Coral Gables, Florida, U.S.
- Spouse: Alfonso, Prince of Asturias (m. 1933; div. 1937)
Names
- Edelmira Ignacia Adriana
- Father: Luciano Pablo Sampedro y Ocejo
- Mother: Edelmira Robato y Turro

Edelmira Ignacia Adriana Sampedro-Ocejo y Robato (5 March 1906 – 23 May 1994) was known as the Countess of Covadonga after her marriage to Alfonso, former Prince of Asturias, in 1933.

== Early life and marriage ==
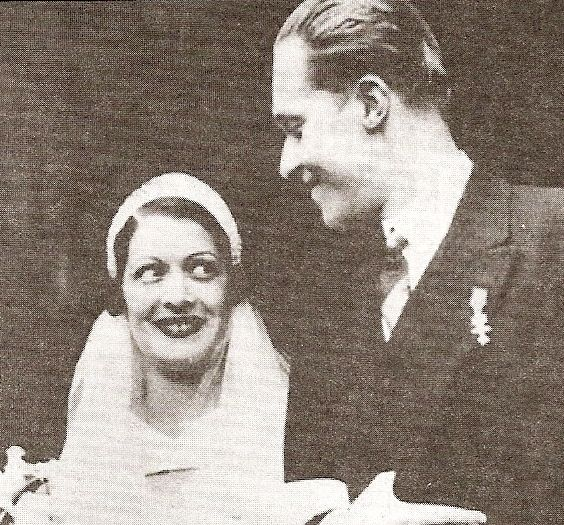
Alfonso and Edelmira.

The Countess was the daughter of a Cuban merchant, Luciano Pablo Sampedro y Ocejo, later hyphenated to Sampedro-Ocejo, and his wife Edelmira Robato y Turro, later hyphenated Robato-Turro. She was a cousin of Jorge Mañach y Robato. She met the Prince at a Lausanne sanatorium where he was being treated for his haemophilia. They saw each other one night at a cinema in the Swiss city of Lausanne and they fell in love.

The young couple faced backlash and adversity from the very beginning of their relationship. The Spanish royal family did not accept the engagement and Edelmira soon had to suffer pressure from the messengers of Alfonso XIII, already exiled in Paris, who noticeably curtailed his son's monthly allowance, confiscated his five cars, and definitively obliged him to give up his right to succession. No one from the Royal House attended the religious wedding at Sacred Heart Church in Ouchy, Lausanne, Switzerland, on 21 June 1933, and the invitations that the Count of Covadonga sent to friends and acquaintances were returned to him "with regret". In the face of his father's bitter opposition to the match, the Prince was quoted saying: "I love her and want to marry her. Let Juan have the throne."

== After divorce ==
The couple's life together was very difficult, due in part to Alfonso's haemophilia, but also because of Edelmira's disproportionate jealousy. The couple broke up from time to time but would always get back together, until 1937, when she accused him of seeing another woman. In New York City, Alfonso requested the marriage to be nullified and in Havana, Edelmira asked for a divorce, which eventually came to pass on 8 May 1937. On that particular occasion, Edelmira's accusation was based on fact; Alfonso was secretly seeing another woman, Cuban model Marta Esther Rocafort-Altuzarra (18 September 1913 – 4 February 1993). They would get married on 3 June 1937 in Havana, divorcing a few months later.

Alfonso died from injuries sustained in a car accident in Miami on 6 September 1938. He was entombed at Woodlawn Park Cemetery and Mausoleum (now Caballero Rivero Woodlawn Park North Cemetery and Mausoleum) in Miami. In 1985, he was re-entombed in the Pantheon of the Princes in El Escorial. Edelmira, who had been allowed to retain the title Countess of Covadonga but at the time in her early-eighties, was asked by the royal family to attend the re-entombment but she declined. After her divorce and his death, the royal family of Spain treated her well and accorded her all the rights of a widow in the royal family. She never gave an interview in over 60 years and never remarried. When Alfonso's mother Queen Victoria Eugenie died, Edelmira was left some jewellery. She first lived in Havana and, after the Cuban Revolution, at 722 Cadima Avenue in Coral Gables, Florida until her death.
