= Marta Esther Rocafort-Altuzarra =

Spanish noble

- Born: 18 September 1913; Havana, Cuba
- Died: 4 February 1993 (aged 79); Miami, Florida, U.S.
- Spouse: Alfonso, Prince of Asturias (m. 1937; div. 1938) Thomas E. H. Atkins, Jr. Rodolfo Caballero
- Father: Blas Manuel Rocafort y González
- Mother: Rogelia Altuzarra y Carbonell

Marta Esther Rocafort y Altuzarra, later hyphenated Rocafort-Altuzarra (18 September 1913 – 4 February 1993) was the second wife of the Count of Covadonga (previously known as Alfonso, Prince of Asturias).

Rocafort, a fashion model, was the eldest daughter of Blas Manuel Rocafort y González, a prominent Cuban dentist, and wife Rogelia Altuzarra y Carbonell. Her siblings were Elvira and Blas Rocafort y Altuzarra, later hyphenated Rocafort-Altuzarra.

Rocafort began dating the Count in New York City before his first marriage to Edelmira Sampedro y Robato ended.

On 3 July 1937, the Count married Rocafort-Atuzarra in a civil wedding at the Spanish Embassy in Havana, Cuba, attended by the President of Cuba, Federico Laredo Brú. Two months later they separated and on 8 January 1938, they were divorced in New York City.

She then married the Miami millionaire, Thomas E. H. "Tommy" Atkins Jr. at the Central Baptist Church in Miami on 19 March 1938. Her former husband died six months later in Miami on 6 September 1938.

She married a third time to Rodolfo Caballero.

Her nephew is the Spanish fashion designer Juanjo Rocafort (Juan José Rocafort Huete).
