= Alfonso, Prince of Asturias (1907–1938) =

Prince of Asturias

Alfonso
- Prince of Asturias; Count of Covadonga
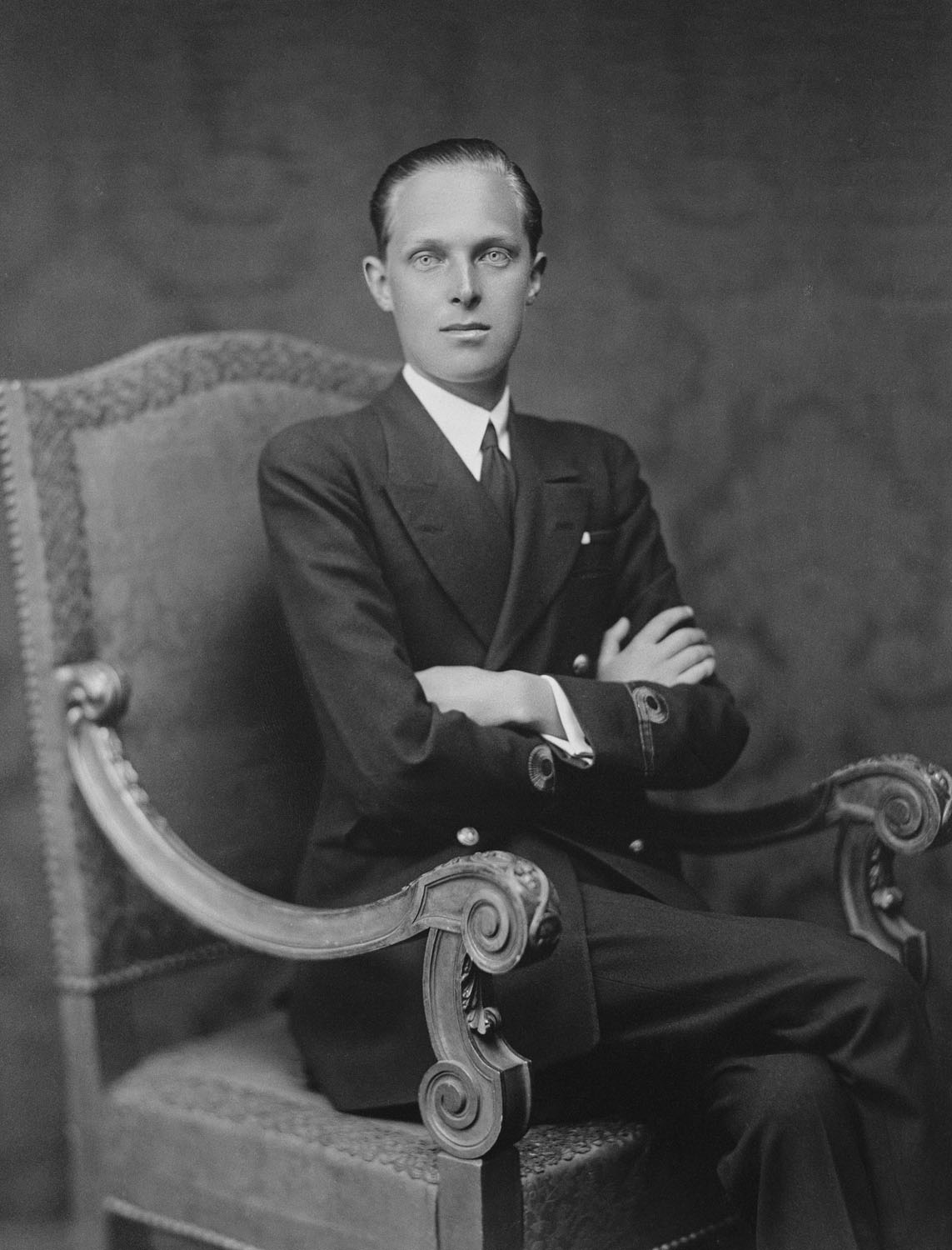
- Formal photo portrait by Franzen, 1927
- Born: 10 May 1907; Royal Palace of Madrid, Madrid, Spain
- Died: 6 September 1938 (aged 31); Miami, Florida, U.S.
- Burial: 1938: Woodlawn Park Cemetery and Mausoleum, Miami, Florida; 1985; El Escorial
- Spouse: Edelmira Sampedro y Robato (m. 1933; div. 1937) Marta Esther Rocafort-Altuzarra (m. 1937; div. 1938)
Names
- Alfonso Pío Cristino Eduardo Francisco Guillermo Carlos Enrique Eugenio Fernando Antonio Venancio
- House: Bourbon
- Father: Alfonso XIII
- Mother: Victoria Eugenie of Battenberg

Alfonso, Prince of Asturias (10 May 1907 – 6 September 1938), was heir apparent to the throne of Spain from birth until the abolition of the monarchy in 1931. He renounced his rights to the defunct throne in 1933. Alfonso was the eldest son of King Alfonso XIII of Spain and Victoria Eugenie of Battenberg.

Alfonso's renunciation of his rights as heir to the Spanish throne in order to marry Cuban commoner Edelmira Sampedro caused controversy at the time. A similar situation would take place three years later in Britain with his second cousin Edward VIII, who would abdicate as King of the United Kingdom and Emperor of India to marry an American divorcee, Wallis Simpson.

He died at the age of 31 as a result of a car crash. Though appearing to have sustained minor injuries, his haemophilia, inherited through his great-grandmother Queen Victoria, led to fatal internal bleeding.

== Early life ==
Alfonso was the eldest child of the then-reigning King Alfonso XIII and Victoria Eugenie of Battenberg. He inherited the genetic disorder haemophilia from his maternal line, as did a number of his matrilineal relatives. He and his youngest brother, Gonzalo, were kept in specially-tailored jackets to prevent injury from accidents.

He was born on 10 May 1907 at the Royal Palace of Madrid. As decreed by custom, he was registered by the Marquis of Figueroa, Minister of Justice, in the Civil Registry of the Royal Family as Alfonso Pío Cristino Eduardo Francisco Guillermo Carlos Enrique Eugenio Fernando Antonio Venancio.

Eight days after his birth, Alfonso was christened in the royal chapel of the Royal Palace of Madrid by the Archbishop of Toledo. His godparents were his paternal grandmother, Queen Maria Cristina, and Pope Pius X, who was represented by Aristide Cardinal Rinaldini. Prince Arthur, Duke of Connaught, Prince Friedrich Leopold of Prussia, Archduke Eugen of Austria and Afonso, Duke of Porto, were also present. After the ceremony, his father conferred upon him the collars of the orders of the Golden Fleece and Charles III and the Grand Cross of the Order of Isabella the Catholic.

Alfonso's father faced increasing political problems that led Spain to become a republic in 1931 when the monarch was deposed. The family moved into exile.

== Renunciation and marriages ==
There had been plans for young Alfonso's deposition from succession, but ultimately he himself renounced his rights to the then-defunct throne to marry a commoner, Edelmira Sampedro y Robato, religiously in Ouchy on 21 June 1933, after which Alfonso took the courtesy title Count of Covadonga. His renunciation was required by the regulations for the succession set by the Pragmatic Sanction of Charles III, which regulated marriages of the royal family. The couple divorced 8 May 1937, with Edelmira keeping the title Countess of Covadonga.

In a civil ceremony on 3 July 1937, Alfonso married another commoner, Marta Esther Rocafort-Altuzarra, in Havana. They divorced on 8 January 1938. He had no children by either of his wives. However, Alfonso de Bourbon, a resident of California, later claimed to be an illegitimate son of Alfonso.

In 1938, Alfonso, then resident in the United States, publicly stated his readiness to accept the Spanish crown if called on to do so. Spain was at this date in the midst of civil war. This action reversed Alfonso's renunciation of 1933 and led to his being disavowed by his father King Alfonso.

== Death ==
A car crash led to Alfonso's early death on September 6, 1938, at the age of 31. He was being driven at night through Miami by an entertainer, Miss Mildred Gaydon, who swerved to avoid a truck. The car crashed into a telephone booth and Alfonso appeared to have only minor injuries, but his haemophilia led to fatal internal bleeding. Alfonso’s youngest brother, Gonzalo, had died just over four years before under very similar circumstances—having also inherited hemophilia, he was involved in a crash after the automobile he was in swerved to avoid a cyclist. The crash had caused severe abdominal bleeding to Gonzalo, ultimately leading to his death.

Alfonso was entombed at Woodlawn Park Cemetery and Mausoleum (now Caballero Rivero Woodlawn Park North Cemetery and Mausoleum) in Miami, and was re-entombed in 1985 at the Pantheon of the Princes in El Escorial. His first wife, who had been allowed to retain the title Countess of Covadonga, was asked by the royal family to attend the re-entombment, but she declined.

Alfonso was the 1,120th Knight of the Order of the Golden Fleece in Spain and Knight with Collar of the Order of Charles III, inducted as both shortly after his birth in 1907.

== Gallery ==
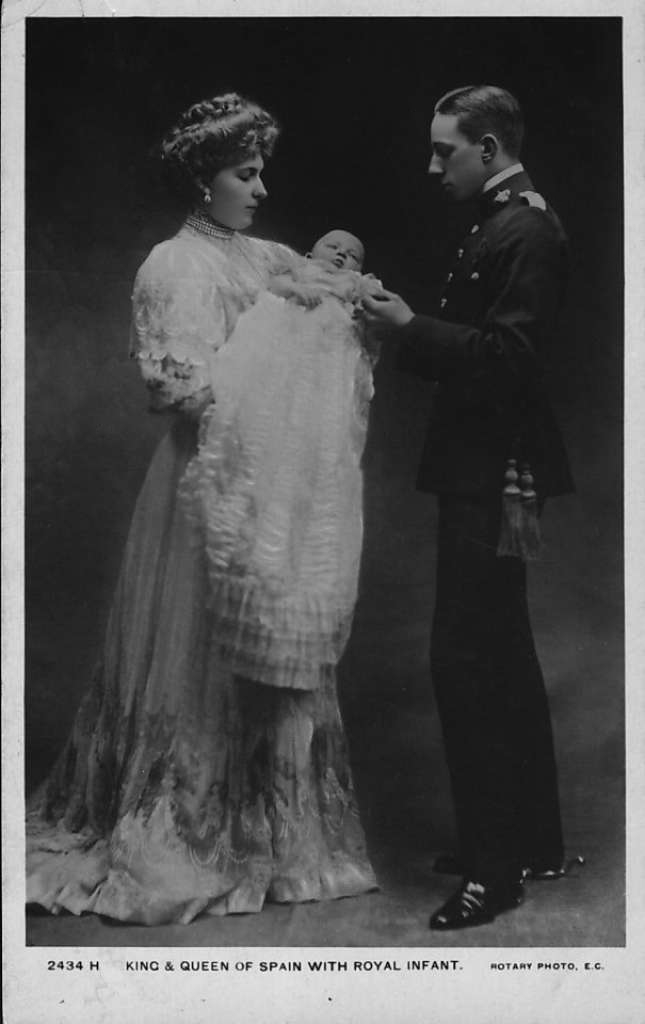
Queen Victoria Eugenie and King Alfonso XIII with newly-born Alfonso, 1908.

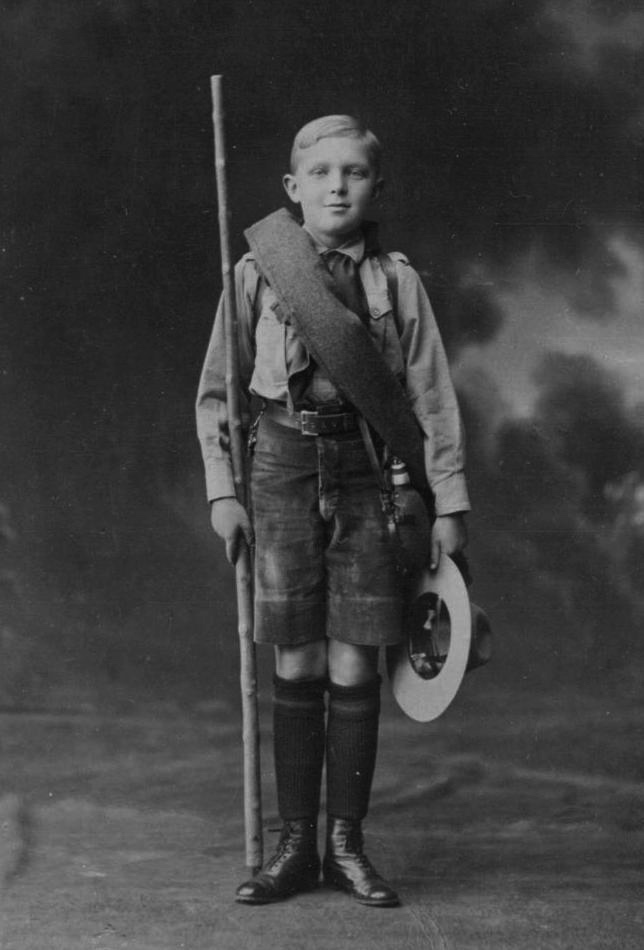
Alfonso aged 11 wearing the Scout uniform of the Explorers of Spain, 1918.

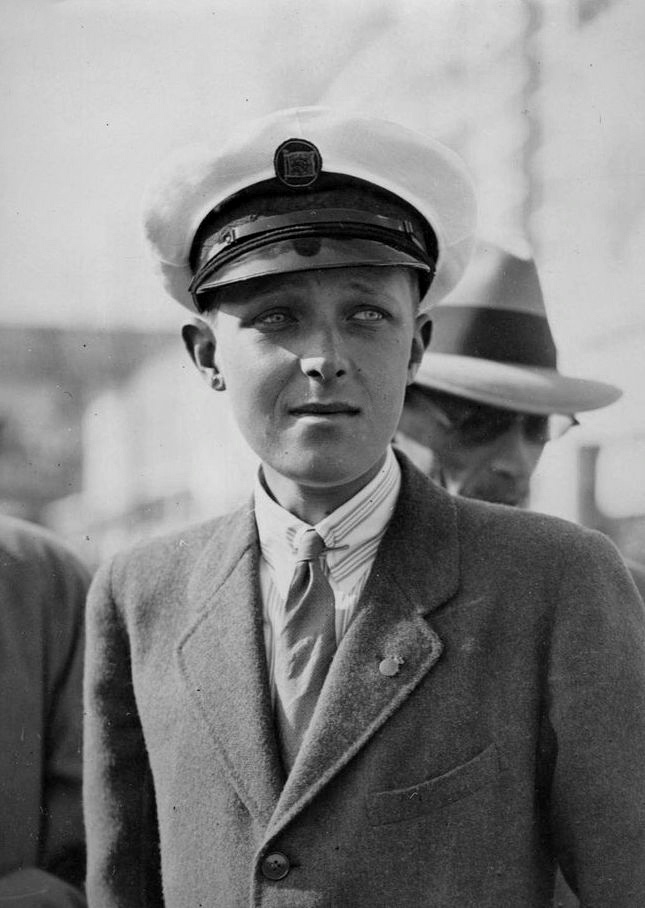
Photograph of Alfonso, 1922.

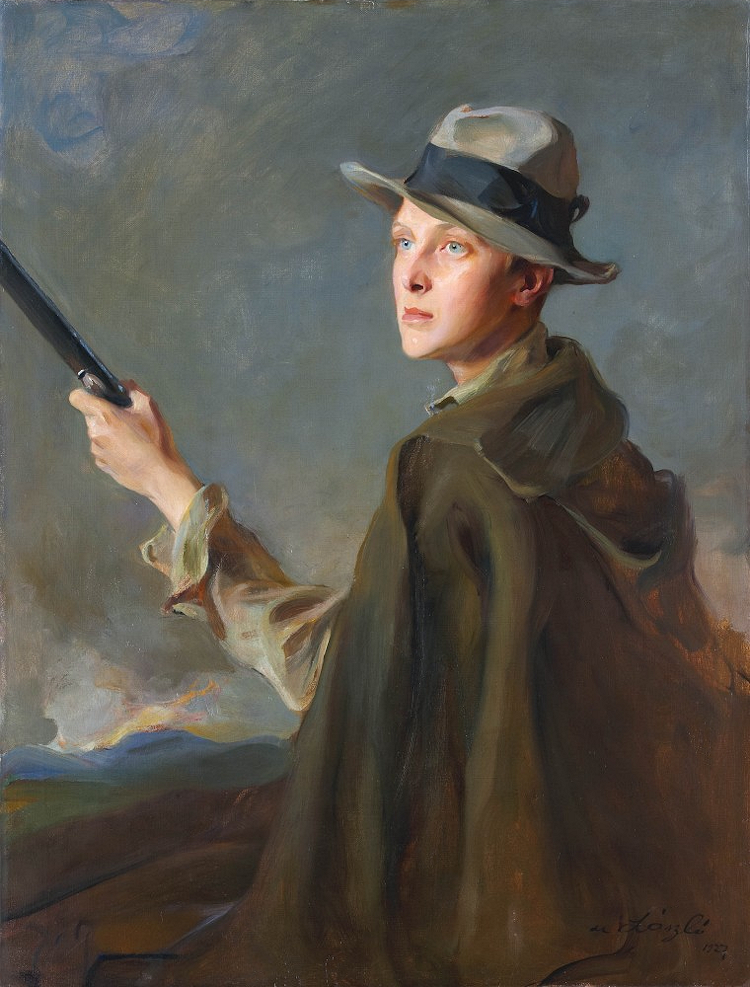
Portrait of Alfonso, portrayed in hunting outfit, holding a side-by-side "Sarasqueta" gun, by Philip de László, 1927.

== Ancestry ==
Ancestors of Alfonso, Prince of Asturias (1907–1938)

8. Infante Francisco de Asís of Spain
4. Alfonso XII of Spain
9. Isabella II of Spain
2. Alfonso XIII of Spain
10. Archduke Karl Ferdinand of Austria
5. Archduchess Maria Christina of Austria
11. Archduchess Elisabeth Franziska of Austria
1. Alfonso, Prince of Asturias
12. Prince Alexander of Hesse and by Rhine
6. Prince Henry of Battenberg
13. Countess Julia Hauke
3. Princess Victoria Eugenie of Battenberg
14. Prince Albert of Saxe-Coburg and Gotha
7. Princess Beatrice of the United Kingdom
15. Victoria of the United Kingdom

== Heraldry ==
Heraldry of Prince Alfonso of Spain

Arms of Prince Alfonso of Spain

== Bibliography ==
- Pedersen, Jørgen. Riddere af Elefantordenen 1559–2009, Odense: Syddansk Universitetsforlag, 2009. ISBN 8776744345

== Sources ==
- Time, 12 June 1933
- El Nuevo Herald, 23 May 2004
- El Mundo, 2 July 1994

Alfonso, Prince of Asturias (1907–1938) House of Bourbon Cadet branch of the Capetian dynasty Born: 10 May 1907 Died: 6 September 1938
Spanish royalty
Vacant Title last held by Mercedes	Prince of Asturias; 1907–1931	Vacant Second Spanish Republic Title next held by Felipe
Loss of title	— TITULAR — Prince of Asturias; 1931–1933; Reason for succession failure: Second Spanish Republic	Succeeded by Juan
Vacant Title last held by Infante Jaime, Duke of Madrid	— TITULAR — Dauphin of France; Legitimist succession 29 September 1936 – 6 September 1938	Succeeded by Infante Jaime, Duke of Segovia
