= Infante Gonzalo of Spain =

Spanish infante (1914–1934)

Infante Gonzalo
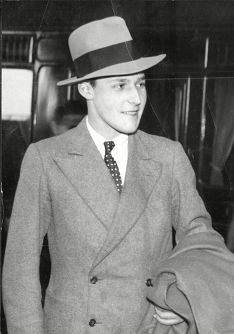
- Infante Gonzalo in 1933
- Born: 24 October 1914; Royal Palace of Madrid, Spain
- Died: 13 August 1934 (aged 19); Krumpendorf, Austria
- Burial: Pörtschach am Wörthersee, Austria (1934); Pantheon of the Princes, El Escorial (after 1934)
Names
- Gonzalo Manuel Maria Bernardo Narciso Alfonso Mauricio de Borbón y Battenberg
- House: Bourbon
- Father: Alfonso XIII of Spain
- Mother: Victoria Eugenie of Battenberg

Infante Gonzalo of Spain (Gonzalo Manuel Maria Bernardo Narciso Alfonso Mauricio de Borbón y Battenberg; 24 October 1914 – 13 August 1934) was the fourth surviving son and youngest child of King Alfonso XIII of Spain and his wife Princess Victoria Eugenie of Battenberg. He was the youngest grandson of Princess Beatrice of the United Kingdom.

== Life ==
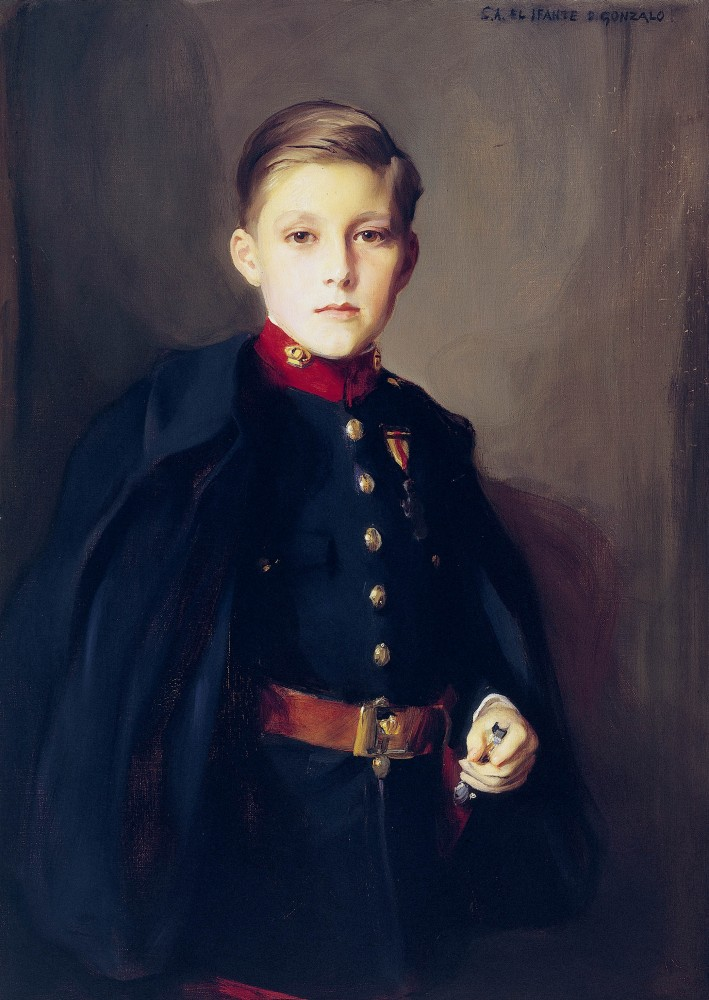
Infante Gonzalo in uniform of the Guardia Real by Philip de László, 1927

Gonzalo was born in Madrid. He was baptized with the names Gonzalo Manuel María Bernardo Narciso Alfonso Mauricio. He received his final name in honor of his uncle, Prince Maurice of Battenberg, who was killed in World War I shortly before Gonzalo's baptism. The infante was educated privately. Because he inherited the genetic disorder hemophilia from his mother's family (a fact not widely known in Spain during his life), he had some ill health, although he was an active sportsman. He held the rank of a private in the Engineering Corps of the Spanish Army. In 1927, he was made the 1,166th Knight of the Spanish branch of the Order of the Golden Fleece.

In May 1924, nine-year-old Gonzalo inaugurated the Estadio Chamartín, the new football stadium for Real Madrid, kicking the ball of honour and yelling "¡Hala Madrid!."

On 14 April 1931, Gonzalo accompanied his mother into exile. He studied engineering at the Catholic University of Leuven, instead of at the University of Madrid as originally planned for him.

In August 1934, Gonzalo was spending the summer holidays with his family at the villa of Count Ladislaus de Hoyos at Pörtschach am Wörthersee in Austria. On the evening of 11 August, Gonzalo and his sister Infanta Beatriz were driving from Klagenfurt to Pörtschach. Near Krumpendorf, Beatriz, who was driving, was forced to swerve to avoid a cyclist (the retired jockey Baron Neimans). The car crashed into a wall. Neither Gonzalo nor Beatriz appeared badly hurt, and so they returned to their villa. Several hours later it became clear that Gonzalo had severe abdominal bleeding. Because he had a weak heart, an operation was ruled out. He died two days later. His eldest brother, Alfonso, would die just over four years later from very similar circumstances—having also inherited hemophilia, he was involved in a crash after the automobile he was in swerved to avoid a truck. The crash caused severe internal bleeding, ultimately leading to his death.

Gonzalo was buried in the graveyard at Pörtschach. Later, his body was moved to the Pantheon of the Princes in El Escorial.

== Ancestry ==
Ancestors of Infante Gonzalo of Spain

8. Infante Francisco de Asís of Spain
4. Alfonso XII of Spain
9. Isabella II of Spain
2. Alfonso XIII of Spain
10. Archduke Karl Ferdinand of Austria
5. Archduchess Maria Christina of Austria
11. Archduchess Elisabeth Franziska of Austria
1. Infante Gonzalo of Spain
12. Prince Alexander of Hesse and by Rhine
6. Prince Henry of Battenberg
13. Countess Julia Hauke
3. Princess Victoria Eugenie of Battenberg
14. Prince Albert of Saxe-Coburg and Gotha
7. Princess Beatrice of the United Kingdom
15. Victoria of the United Kingdom

== Heraldry ==
Heraldry of Infante Gonzalo of Spain

Arms of Infante Gonzalo of Spain
(1927–1931/1934)

== Bibliography ==
- "Auto Crash Fatal to Spanish Prince", The New York Times (14 August 1934): 7.
- "Spain to Honor Infante", The New York Times (14 August 1934): 7.
- "Funeral Rites Today for Spanish Prince", The New York Times (15 August 1934): 17.
- "Don Gonzalo Buried in an Austrian Grave", The New York Times (16 August 1934): 17.
- "Spanish Prince Killed", The Times (14 August 1934): 12.
- "Regret in Madrid", The Times (14 August 1934): 12.
- "The Infante Gonzalo", The Times (14 August 1934): 13.
- "The Late Infante Don Gonzalo", The Times (16 August 1934): 9.
