= Speakman =

Speakman is an English surname. Notable people with the surname include:

- Alfred Speakman (1880–1943), Canadian politician from Alberta
- Bill Speakman (1927–2018), British soldier, recipient of the Victoria Cros
- Bill Speakman (footballer) (1904–1960), Australian rules footballer
- Dom Speakman (born 1994), English rugby league footballer
- Fergie Speakman (1900–1990), Australian athletics coach
- Fred J Speakman (died 1982), British naturalist
- Harold Speakman (1888–1928), American poet and travel writer
- Harry Speakman (1864–1915), English rugby union footballer
- Howard C. Speakman (1892–1952), American judge in Arizona
- James Speakman (born 1888), English footballer
- James Stanley Speakman (1906–1962), Canadian politician from Alberta
- Jeff Speakman (born 1958), American actor and martial artist
- John Speakman (born 1958), British biologist and academic
- John Speakman (politician) (1873–1942), British politician and trade unionist
- John W. Speakman (1900–1942), American lawyer and politician from Illinois
- June Speakman, American politician and academic from Rhode Island
- Mark Speakman (born 1959), Australian politician from New South Wales
- Percy Speakman (1885–1933), Australian rules footballer
- Robert Speakman (born 1980), Welsh footballer
- Sam Speakman (1884–1934), English footballer
- Sammy Speakman (1934–2017), English footballer

== See also ==
- Nik & Eva Speakman, duo of British life coaches
- Thomas Speakman Barnett (1909–2003), Canadian politician from Alberta
- Philip Speakman Webb (1831–1915), British architect and designer
- Speckman
