= Christian E. Elger =

German neurologist

Christian E. Elger FRCP
- Born: Christian Erich Elger; 21 October 1949 (age 77); Augsburg, West Germany
- Alma mater: University of Münster; University of Tübingen
- Known for: Research on epilepsy, including seizure prediction using nonlinear EEG analysis
- Awards: Michael Prize of the International League Against Epilepsy (1983); European Epileptology Award (2012)
- Scientific career
- Fields: Neurology, Epileptology
- Workplaces: University of Bonn; University Hospital Bonn; Center for Economics and Neuroscience; Beta Klinik, Bonn
- Doctoral advisor: Erwin-Josef Speckmann

Christian Erich Elger FRCP (born October 21, 1949, in Augsburg) is a German neurologist and epileptologist who worked as a neurologist at the Center for Economics and Neuroscience CENs in Bonn. After his retirement from Bonn, he became senior professor of neuropaediatrics and paediatric epileptology at Charité – Universitätsmedizin Berlin.

== Early life and education ==
After graduating from high school in Stuttgart in 1968, Elger studied mathematics and chemistry at the University of Tübingen. He earned an M.D. (1976) and Ph.D. (Physiology, 1982) at the University of Münster.

His doctoral thesis at Münster was awarded summa cum laude.

== Academic career ==
From 1976 to 1982 he was an assistant at the Institute of Physiology at the University of Münster (with the neurophysiologist Erwin-Josef Speckmann) with a qualification in physiology in 1982. He then completed his Medical Recognition training in neurology in Münster, Memphis (USA), and Zurich from 1982 to 1985. He was Professor of Epileptology at the University of Bonn beginning in 1987, and from 1990 to his retirement in 2018, Full Professor and Director of the Epileptology Clinic at University Hospital Bonn. He was co-founder and Director of the Center for Economics and Neuroscience CENs in Bonn.

After qualifying as a specialist in neurology in 1985, he worked as a senior physician at the Clinic for Neurology at the University of Münster until 1987, and completed a second habilitation, in neurology, in 1986. His chair in Bonn was initially a C3 professorship in epileptology created for him, which became a C4 professorship in 1990, when he also became head of the Department of Epileptology.

From 1986 to 1987 he was also a member of the board of the Westphalia-Lippe Medical Association. The Bonn chair he took up in 1987 was created for him; the post of head of the epileptology department had previously been held by Heinz Penin, the first holder of a chair of epileptology in Germany, who served at Bonn from 1978 until 1990. In Bonn he built an interdisciplinary team in which epilepsy surgery and research are carried out alongside clinical care.

After leaving his Bonn chair, Elger was appointed senior professor of neuropaediatrics and paediatric epileptology at Charité – Universitätsmedizin Berlin, and he is also described as a visiting professor at a university hospital. In 2017 he founded Beta Neurology at the Beta Klinik in Bonn.

== Professional activities ==
Elger served on the committee of experts advising the Secretary of Health from 1991 to 1994, and was first chairman of the German Section of the International League Against Epilepsy from 1997 to 1999. From 2000 to 2001 he was president of the German Society for Clinical Neurophysiology, and he has been a member of the North Rhine-Westphalian Academy of Sciences since 2000. He has been an associate editor of the journal Epilepsy & Behavior since 2001.

From 2001 to 2007 he was spokesperson of the Transregional Collaborative Research Centre (TRR 3) on mesial temporal lobe epilepsy, and from 2004 to 2008 he sat on the neuroscience review committee of the German Research Foundation (DFG). He was an associate editor of the journal Brain from 2004 to 2008.

In 2003 he co-founded Life & Brain GmbH in Bonn, serving as its scientific managing director from 2006 to 2015. In 2009 he became co-founder and director of the Center for Economics and Neuroscience at the University of Bonn. In 2017 he founded the neurology department of the Beta Klinik in Bonn, where he treats patients with epilepsy.

== Research ==
Elger's research has focused on clinical epileptology, epilepsy surgery outcomes, cognition in chronic epilepsy, seizure prediction, the network dynamics of the epileptic brain and human memory at the single-cell level. He is a co-author of widely cited ILAE consensus papers on the definition of epilepsy and epileptic seizures. His publication list comprises well over 1,000 scientific papers.

=== Rasmussen encephalitis ===
Elger contributed to the 2005 European consensus statement on the pathogenesis, diagnosis and treatment of Rasmussen encephalitis, published in the journal Brain. The statement proposed formal diagnostic criteria and a therapeutic pathway for this rare, chronic inflammatory neurological disease. Earlier, a 2004 open-label study in Neurology, on which Elger was senior author, found slowed disease progression in patients treated with tacrolimus, supporting the use of immunotherapy in its clinical management.

=== Epileptic brain networks and seizure prediction ===
With physicist Klaus Lehnertz, Elger reported in 1998 that the complexity of brain electrical activity measured by EEG in patients with epilepsy decreases minutes before a seizure, a finding that suggested seizures might be predictable. Further work on nonlinear dynamics, phase synchronization and mean phase coherence in EEG recordings contributed to the understanding of seizure generation and to the long-running effort toward seizure prediction, reviewed in 2007 by Mormann, Andrzejak, Elger and Lehnertz.

The Bonn group later reported seizure precursors hours in advance in patients whose seizures could not be controlled by treatment, with the activity arising in apparently healthy brain tissue rather than in the seizure focus. A 2016 study in Scientific Reports examined weighted and directed interactions in evolving large-scale functional epileptic brain networks.

=== Cognition and epilepsy ===
Together with Florian Mormann, Elger worked on chronic single-unit recording in the human brain to study memory processing at the cellular level. The recordings are made in epilepsy patients implanted with depth electrodes for clinical monitoring, and have identified distinct populations of neurons in the medial temporal lobe that encode specific concepts and locations. A 2024 study in Nature Communications described concept neurons and location neurons that provide the "what" and "where" of episodic memory formation and their 2026 study in Nature showed that separate populations of neurons represent content and context and are co-activated to link them.

== Awards and honours ==
- 1983 – Michael Prize (Stiftung Michael) for epilepsy research
- 1984 and 1990 – Alfred Hauptmann Prize for epilepsy research (1984 shared with Erwin-Josef Speckmann; 1990 shared with Andreas Hufnagel and colleagues)
- 1992 – Marion Merrell Dow Prize for Epilepsy Research (with Christoph Helmstaedter and Andreas Hufnagel); honorary member of the Swiss League Against Epilepsy
- 1997 – Fellow of the Royal College of Physicians (FRCP), London
- 2005 – Ambassador for Epilepsy of the International League Against Epilepsy and the International Bureau for Epilepsy; Zülch Prize of the Gertrud Reemtsma Foundation in the Max Planck Society
- 2010 – Hans Berger Prize of the German Society for Clinical Neurophysiology (DGKN)
- 2011 – Victor and Clara Soriano Award of the World Federation of Neurology
- 2012 – European Epileptology Award of the International League Against Epilepsy
- 2015 – William G. Lennox Award of the American Epilepsy Society
- 2017 – Moritz Romberg Lecture of the European Academy of Neurology
- 2018 – Klüver Memorial Lecture, University of Chicago; Yaşargil Lecture, University Hospital Zurich
- 2019 – Otfrid Foerster Medal of the German Society for Epileptology (Deutsche Gesellschaft für Epileptologie)
