= Bernhard Landwehrmeyer =

German neurologist and neuroscientist (born 1960)

Bernhard Landwehrmeyer FRCP
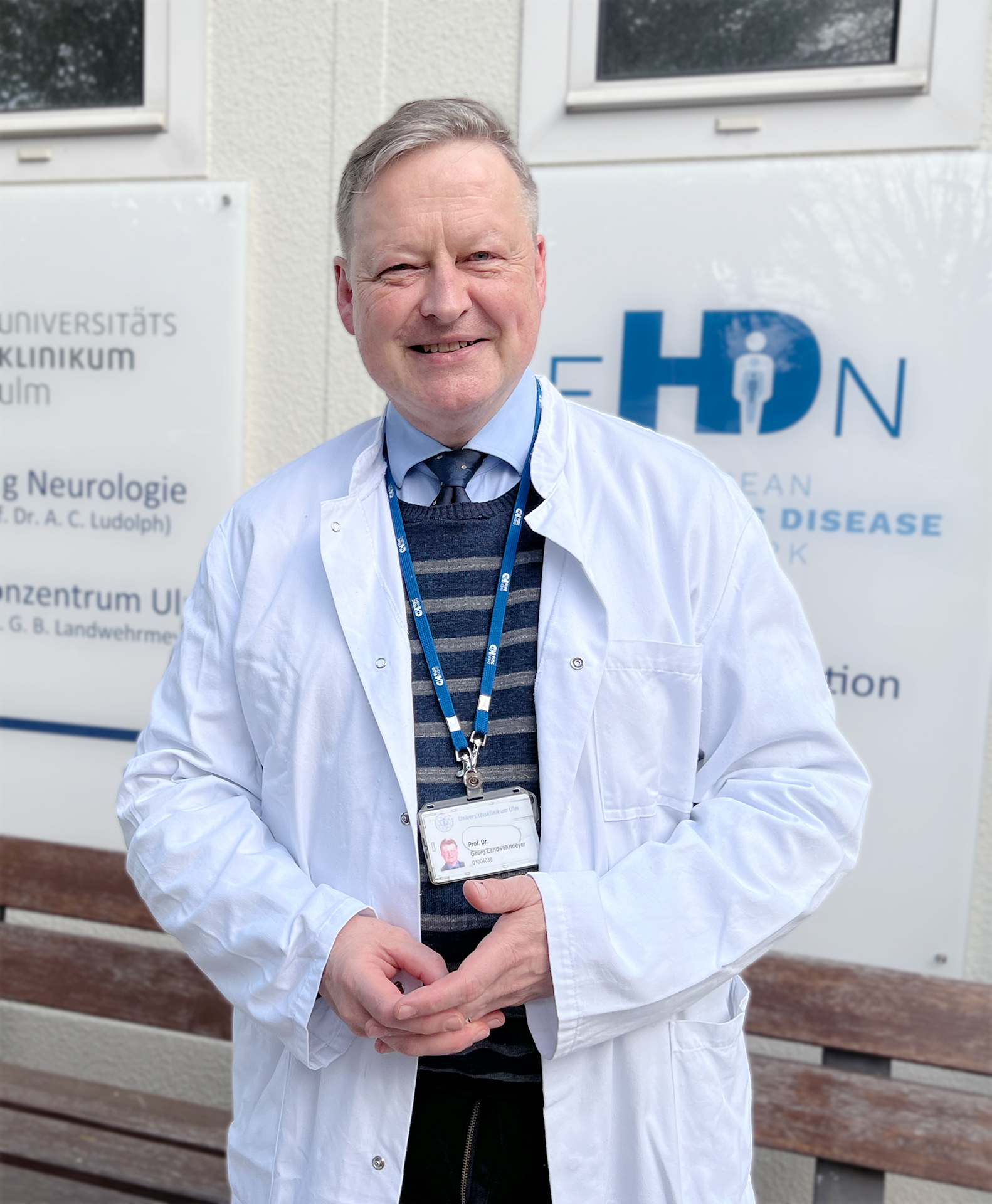
- Landwehrmeyer in 2022
- Born: Georg Bernhard Landwehrmeyer; 1960 (age 65–66); Freiburg, Germany
- Education: University of Freiburg (MD, PhD); Queen's University of Belfast; Harvard Medical School (post Doc); Kantonsspital St. Gallen
- Known for: Research into neurodegeneration, particularly Huntington disease
- Scientific career
- Fields: Neuroscience; Neurodegenerative diseases; Huntington's disease
- Workplaces: UKU
- Thesis: (1990)
- Doctoral advisor: R. Jung
- Website: www.uniklinik-ulm.de/neurologie/sprechstunden-ambulanzen/morbus-huntington.html

Georg Bernhard Landwehrmeyer is a German neurologist and neuroscientist in the field of neurodegeneration primarily focusing on Huntington's disease. Landwehrmeyer is a professor of neurology at Ulm University Hospital. He was one of the founders of the European Huntington's Disease Network (EHDN) in 2004 and was chairman of its executive committee until 2014.

== Education and career ==
Landwehrmeyer received his MD degree and Doctoral Degree from the Albert Ludwigs University of Freiburg, Germany, where he also completed a residency in neurology, research training in neuropathology and molecular pharmacology, and a residency in neurology and psychiatry. Landwehrmeyer studied at the Royal Victoria Hospital, Belfast and Kantonsspital St. Gallen, Basel. He was a post-Doc from 1993 to 1995 at Massachusetts General Hospital, Harvard Medical School. During 1995–1999, he was a staff member at Albert Ludwigs University of Freiburg, Department of Neurology & Psychiatry. In 1999, he received his Board certification in Neurology and has been a full professor since 2000. He served as principal investigator in numerous HD clinical trials and observational studies and is the principal investigator of the CHDI-sponsored Enroll-HD study.

== Research ==
Landwehrmeyer started working on Huntington's Disease (HD) in 1993 when he started a postdoc at Massachusetts General Hospital (MGH) with Anne B. Young, then Chief of Neurology, a couple of months before the HD gene and the HD expansion mutation was discovered. He went to Venezuela with Anne and Nancy Wexler several times, and was alerted to stimulating HD field studies aside from work at the bench.

In 2000 he was appointed full Professor of Neurology, 'Clinical Neurobiology,' at the University of Ulm and was given the opportunity to organize (together with Albert Ludolph, the chairperson of the Department of Neurology at the University of Ulm, who initiated the work) the first large (>500 participants), long-term (3-year randomized clinical trial, followed by a blinded extension) multicenter European phase III HD trial. This collaboration led to forming the European HD Network (EHDN) in 2003–2004, funded by CHDI Foundation, a philanthropic US-American organization. He is the founding chair of the executive committee of EHDN and served in this capacity in 2004–2014. He continues to serve as leader of the EHDN project at the University of Ulm.

The large prospective observational cohort study REGISTRY, conducted by EHDN, recruiting more than 15,000 participants, merged with the cohort study of the Huntington Study Group (HSG) to form Enroll-HD study in 2011, which is still ongoing. Landwehrmeyer serves as the Principal Investigator (PI) of Enroll-HD, a worldwide platform to facilitate HD research and to conduct prospective, observational HD cohort studies for HD families.

His main area of interest is neurodegenerative diseases, such as Huntington disease, Parkinsonian disorders (including progressive supranuclear palsy and multiple system atrophy), frontotemporal lobar degeneration (FTD), and amyotrophic lateral sclerosis (ALS). Other topics on which he published include neuroimaging and pain. Vast majority of Landwehrmeyer's publications are devoted to various aspects of neurobiology of HD, including its genetics, genetic modifiers.

Bernhard Landwehrmeyer was involved in almost all RCTs in HD conducted in Europe since 1999, often serving as coordinating PI or national lead investigator. He contributed to Track-HD and Track-ON HD, two influential observational studies in HD, and to 26 phase I-III clinical trials, primarily in HD, including a first-in-man intrathecal application of antisense oligonucleotides ASO to silence huntingtin gene expression evaluating the safety, tolerability, and efficacy of intrathecally administered agents as well as non-pharmacological interventions, studying the impact of physical activity and exercise in people with HD.

Landwehrmeyer directs the HD Center Ulm, where a multi-disciplinary team takes care of over 700 with HD in an out-patient setting where more than 600 agreed to participate in Enroll-HD. This multi-disciplinary center provides genetic counselling, clinical in- and out-patient services as well as rehabilitation for HD affected families along with basic and translational science. In addition, the HD Center South (in Taufkirchen/Vils) offers 19 in-patient beds dedicated to HD in the setting of a psychiatric hospital and 20-25 beds for in-patient rehab at Ulm.

Landwehrmeyer is also a member of the Scientific Advisory Board (Wissenschaftlicher Beirat) of the German Huntington's Disease Association (Deutsche Huntington-Hilfe e.V., DHH). In this role, he regularly provides expert updates on research developments to the Huntington's patient community, often together with Carsten Saft.

Landwehrmeyer's most significant publications are:

- Long, Jeffrey D; Mills, James A; Leavitt, Blair R; Durr, Alexandra; Roos, Raymund A; Stout, Julie C; Reilmann, Ralf; Landwehrmeyer, Bernhard (2017). "Survival End Points for Huntington Disease Trials Prior to a Motor Diagnosis". JAMA Neurol. 74 (11): 1352–1360. doi:10.1001/jamaneurol.2017.2107. PMC 5710578. PMID 28975278.
- Lehmer, Carina; Oeckl, Patrick; Weishaupt, Jochen H; Volk, Alexander E; Diehl-Schmid, Janine; Schroeter, Matthias L; Lauer, Martin; Kornhuber, Johannes; Levin, Johannes; Fassbender, Klaus; Landwehrmeyer, Bernhard (2017). "Poly-GP in cerebrospinal fluid links C9orf72-associated dipeptide repeat expression to the asymptomatic phase of ALS/FTD". EMBO Mol Med. 9 (7): 859–868. doi:10.15252/emmm.201607486. PMC 5494528. PMID 28408402.
- Tabrizi, Sarah J; Scahill, Rachael I; Owen, Gail; Durr, Alexandra; Leavitt, Blair R; Roos, Raymund A; Borowsky, Beth; Landwehrmeyer, Bernhard (2013). "Predictors of phenotypic progression and disease onset in premanifest and early-stage Huntington's disease in the TRACK-HD study: analysis of 36-month observational data". Lancet Neurol. 12 (7): 673–49. doi:10.1016/S1474-4422(13)70088-7. PMID 23664844. S2CID 12204298.

Landwehrmeyer is a Fellow of the Royal College of Physicians and a member of several learned medical societies.

As of April 2022, Landwehrmeyer had authored over 300 publications, with over 15,000 citations for his research.

== Research awards ==
- Scholarship by the German Academic Scholarship Foundation (1980–1988).
- Training award by the German Research Foundation (DFG) (1990–1991).
- Research award by the German Research Foundation (DFG) (1993–1994).
- Research award by the European Commission (1994–1997), Network of Excellence in Neural Networks.
- Research award by the European Commission (2001–2004), Neuroprotection & Natural History in Parkinson Plus Syndromes (NNIPPS).
- Research award by the European Commission (2010–2013), Pharmacodynamic Approaches to Demonstration of Disease-Modification in Huntington's Disease by SEN0014196.
- Research awards by the CHDI Foundation.
- Research awards by the German Ministry of Education and Research.
- Research awards by the EU Joint Programme – Neurodegenerative Disease Research (JPND Research), DOMINO-HD.
- Research awards by the EU Joint Programme – Neurodegenerative Disease Research (JPND Research), HEALTHE-RND.

== Non-research awards ==
- Huntington Medaille Huntington Zentrum Nord Rhein Westfalen

== Personal life ==
Landwehrmeyer currently lives in Ulm, Germany. His father, Richard Landwehrmeyer, was a German librarian. From 1972 to 1987 he headed the University Library of Tübingen and from 1987 to 1995 the State Library of Berlin as Director General.
