= Larráinzar (disambiguation) =

Larráinzar may refer to:

== People ==
- Domingo Larrainzar (born 1969), Spanish former footballer
- Iñigo Larrainzar (born 1971), Spanish retired footballer
- Manuel Larráinzar (1809-1884), Mexican conservative politician
- María Ernestina Larráinzar Córdoba (1854-1925), Italian-born Mexican writer, teacher, religious order founder
- Oier Larraínzar (born 1977), Spanish retired footballer

== Places ==
- Larráinzar, municipality in Chiapas, Mexico
- San Andrés Larráinzar, town in Chiapas, Mexico
