= CHDI =

CHDI may refer to:

- CHDI-FM, a Canadian radio station, broadcasting at 102.9 FM in Edmonton, Alberta
- CHDI Foundation, a US non-profit foundation that aims to develop treatments for Huntington's disease
- Child Health and Development Institute, a US pediatric health organization
- Clinton-Hunter Development Initiative, former name of the Clinton Development Initiative, a division of the Clinton Foundation
- Community Health Data Initiative, a US Government initiative to make high-value data available to the public

In addition, the colloquial Welsh language word chdi is a variant of ti, the informal singular second-person pronoun, restricted to north Wales.
