= Infante Jaime, Duke of Segovia =

Spanish infante (1908–1975)

Infante Jaime
- Duke of Segovia, Duke of Anjou
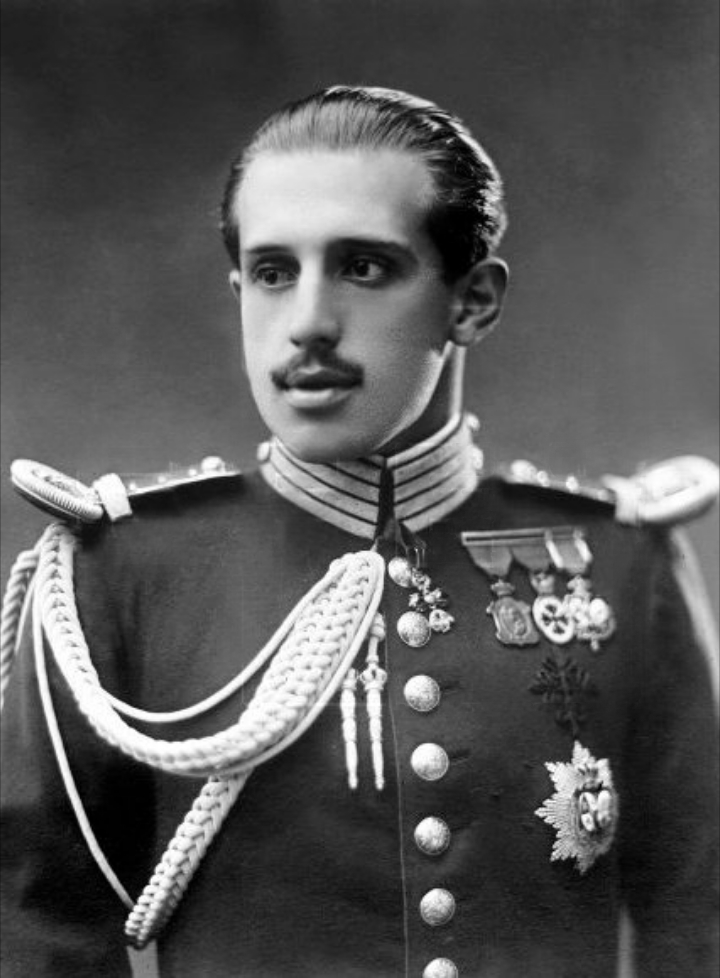
- Jaime in 1935

Legitimist pretender to the French throne
- Pretence: 28 February 1941 – 20 March 1975
- Predecessor: Alfonso XIII
- Successor: Alfonso, Duke of Anjou and Cádiz
- Born: 23 June 1908; Royal Palace of La Granja de San Ildefonso, Segovia, Spain
- Died: 20 March 1975 (aged 66); St. Gall Cantonal Hospital, St. Gallen, Switzerland
- Burial: El Escorial, San Lorenzo de El Escorial, Madrid, Spain
- Spouse: Emmanuelle de Dampierre (m. 1935; div. 1947) Charlotte Tiedemann (m. 1949)
- Issue: Alfonso, Duke of Anjou and Cádiz; Gonzalo, Duke of Aquitaine
Names
- Don Jaime Leopoldo Isabelino Enrique Alejandro Alberto Alfonso Víctor Acacio Pedro Pablo María de Borbón y Battenberg and Jacques Léopold Isabellin Henri Alexandre Albért Alphonse Victor Acace Pierre Paul Marie de Bourbon
- House: Bourbon
- Father: Alfonso XIII of Spain
- Mother: Victoria Eugenie of Battenberg
- Religion: Roman Catholic

Infante Jaime of Spain, Duke of Segovia (Spanish: Don Jaime Leopoldo Isabelino Enrique Alejandro Alberto Alfonso Víctor Acacio Pedro Pablo María de Borbón y Battenberg; French: Jacques Léopold Isabellin Henri Alexandre Albért Alphonse Victor Acace Pierre Paul Marie de Bourbon; 23 June 1908 – 20 March 1975), was the second son of King Alfonso XIII of Spain and his wife, Princess Victoria Eugenie of Battenberg. He was born in the Royal Palace of La Granja de San Ildefonso in Province of Segovia, and was consequently granted the non-substantive title of "Duke of Segovia". Upon his father's death in 1941, Jaime inherited the Legitimist claim to the French throne and thereafter used the courtesy title "Duke of Anjou".

== Early life ==
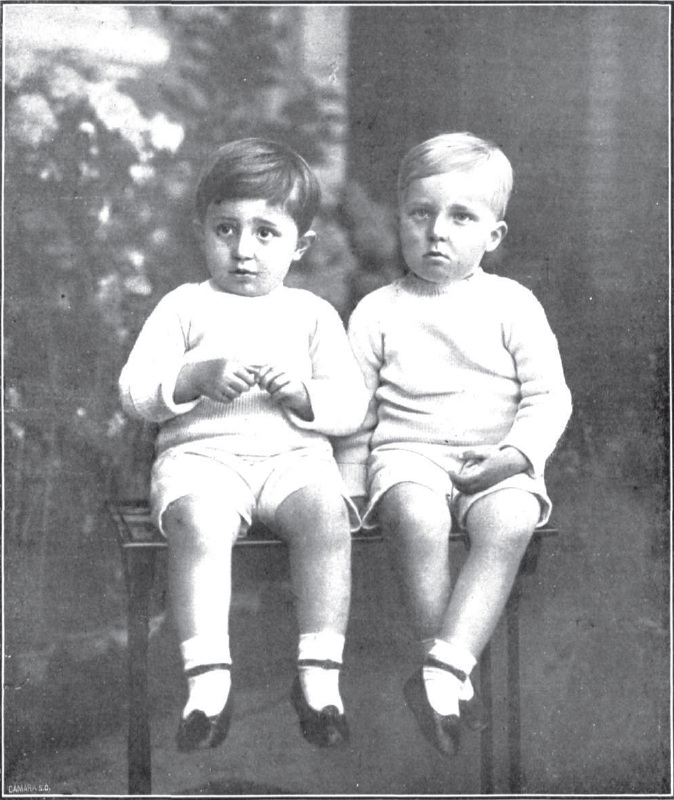
Infante Jaime and his brother, Alfonso, Prince of Asturias, 1909, by Kaulak

Infante Jaime was born 23 June 1908 at the Royal Palace of La Granja de San Ildefonso, the second son of King Alfonso XIII and his Hessian wife, Victoria Eugenie of Battenberg, the youngest granddaughter of Queen Victoria. He was baptised six days later in the Throne Room of the Royal Palace by the Archbishop of Toledo. His godparents were his great-aunt Infanta Isabel, Countess of Girgenti and Luitpold, Prince Regent of Bavaria.

He had three brothers, Alfonso, Prince of Asturias (1907–1938), Infante Juan, Count of Barcelona (1913–1993), and Infante Gonzalo (1914–1934); and two younger sisters, Infanta Beatriz (1909–2002) and Infanta María Cristina (1911–1996). His elder brother, the Prince of Asturias, and his youngest brother, Gonzalo, both had the bleeding disorder hemophilia, the genetic condition that plagued many descendants of Queen Victoria.

Infante Jaime was born with an infection of the inner ear that progressively worsened, causing him to gradually lose his hearing. He was left completely deaf by age four after an operation for double mastoiditis. His desperate parents feared he would be both deaf and mute and sent him to experts across the continent. He apparently endured inflicted electric shock therapy in attempts to treat him. He was educated by two nuns who prohibited anyone from using sign language to communicate with him. Through lip reading, he managed to learn to speak in three languages.

Despite his deafness, he was a well-liked child who loved sports, especially gymnastics, visiting museums, and walking in the countryside.

== Right of succession ==
The Second Spanish Republic was proclaimed on 14 April 1931, abolishing the monarchy. The family went into exile in Fontainebleau. Jaime completed his education at the Institut National de Jeunes Sourds de Paris.

On 11 June 1933, his elder brother and heir to the defunct throne, Alfonso, renounced his title of Prince of Asturias in order to marry a Cuban commoner. Infante Jaime then held the title of Prince of Asturias, as successor to the throne of Spain, for only ten days before under pressure from his father, he was forced also to renounce his rights and the rights of his heirs, in favor of his younger, healthier brother Infante Juan. He was then granted the title "Duke of Segovia" by King Alfonso XIII.

However he retained his rights as claimant to the defunct French throne. After his father's death in 1941, he proclaimed himself the senior legitimate male heir of the House of Capet, heir to the French throne, and head of the House of Bourbon. He then took the title of "Duke of Anjou" and became, in the opinion of French legitimists, the de jure king of France as "Henri VI", though to a minority as "Jacques II" (after 1957, he signed all documents as Jacques Henri). There were however a handful of legitimists who questioned his claim, given the rumors of his paternal grandfather's illegitimacy.

In 1921, he became the 1,153rd Knight of the Order of the Golden Fleece and Knight with Collar of the Order of Charles III and Grand Cross of the Order of Isabella the Catholic both in 1925 (Collar of the Order of Isabella the Catholic in 1931). Later in 1941, following the death of his father and his ascendance to the title of King of France, Jaime adopted the Order of the Holy Spirit as his own by his right to the French Throne.

== Marriage and issue ==
On 4 March 1935, in Rome, Jaime married Victoire Jeanne Emmanuelle (Emanuela) Joséphine Pierre Marie de Dampierre (8 November 1913 in Rome – 3 May 2012 in Rome), daughter of Roger de Dampierre, 2nd Duke of San Lorenzo Nuovo, Vicomte de Dampierre (1892–1975) and of Donna Vittoria Ruspoli (1892–1982), daughter of Emanuele Ruspoli, 1st Prince di Poggio Suasa, and his third wife, English American Josephine Mary Curtis. Don Jaime and Donna Emanuela had two sons, named after Jaime's brothers, Alfonso and Gonzalo:

- Alfonso, Duke of Anjou and Cádiz (20 April 1936 – 20 January 1989); he married María del Carmen Martínez-Bordiú y Franco on 8 March 1972 and they were divorced in 1986. They had two sons and four grandchildren.
- Gonzalo, Duke of Aquitaine (5 June 1937 – 5 March 2000); he married María Carmen Harto Montealegre on 18 April 1983. He remarried María de las Mercedes Licer García on 25 June 1984 and they were divorced on 31 January 1989. He remarried to Emanuela Maria Pratolongo on 30 June 1984 and they were separated on 7 March 1986. Gonzalo and Emanuela were also married in a religious ceremony on 17 September 1992. He has an illegitimate daughter and five grandsons.

Don Jaime and Emmanuelle de Dampierre divorced on 6 May 1947 in Bucharest (recognized by the Italian courts on 3 June 1949 in Turin but never recognized in Spain) and, on 3 August 1949 in Innsbruck, Don Jaime remarried civilly to divorced singer Charlotte Luise Auguste Tiedemann (2 January 1919 in Königsberg – 3 July 1979 in Berlin), daughter of Otto Eugen Tiedemann and wife Luise Amalia Klein. In the eyes of the Roman Catholic Church and of the French legitimists, Emmanuelle de Dampierre (whose religious marriage with Don Jaime was not dissolved) remained always his wife. The second marriage produced no children. His first wife remarried in Vienna, on 21 November 1949, to Antonio Sozzani (12 July 1918 in Milan – 6 January 2007 in Milan), son of Cesare Sozzani and wife Cristina Alemani, without issue.

== Renunciation ==
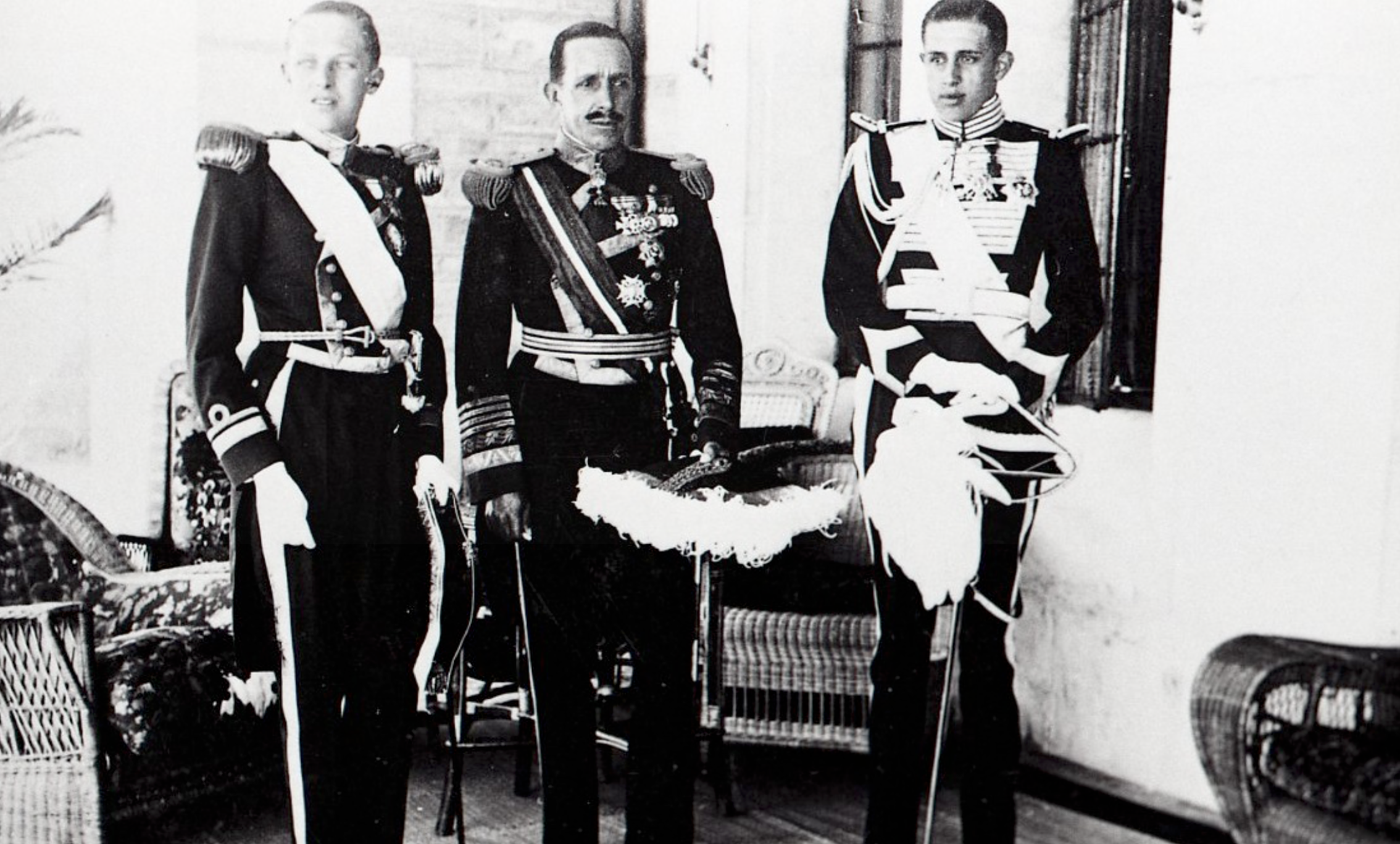
Jaime (right) with his father Alfonso XIII and his older brother Alfonso (left), ca. 1930

On 6 December 1949, Don Jaime retracted his renunciation of the restored throne of Spain. On 3 May 1964, he took the title "Duke of Madrid" as head of a Carlist branch of the Spanish succession (recognized by the legitimist group of Carlists who did not support the Bourbon-Parma claim after Alfonso Carlos, Duke of San Jaime died in 1936). On 19 July 1969, Don Jaime definitively renounced the Spanish succession in favour of his nephew, the future King Juan Carlos I, at the request of his elder son, Alfonso de Borbón.

Don Jaime died in St. Gall Cantonal Hospital in Switzerland on 20 March 1975. He is buried at the Royal Monastery of San Lorenzo de El Escorial.

== Honours and arms ==
=== Honours ===
- (Kingdom of France) House of Bourbon-France : Sovereign and Knight of the Royal Order of Saint Michael
- (Kingdom of France) House of Bourbon-France : Sovereign and Knight of the Royal Order of the Holy Spirit
- (Kingdom of France) House of Bourbon-France : Sovereign and Knight of the Royal and Military Order of Saint Louis
- (Kingdom of the Two Sicilies) House of Bourbon-Two Sicilies : Knight Grand Cross of Justice of the Sacred Military Constantinian Order of Saint George
- (Kingdom of the Two Sicilies) House of Bourbon-Two Sicilies : Knight of the Order of Saint Januarius
- Kingdom of Spain : Knight of the Golden Fleece
- Kingdom of Spain : Knight Grand Cross of the Order of Charles III
- Kingdom of Spain : Knight Grand Cross of the Order of Isabella the Catholic
- (Danish Realm) Kingdom of Denmark : Knight of the Order of the Elephant
- (Georgia (country)) House of Bagrationi-Moukhraneli : Knight of the Order of the Eagle of Georgia

=== Arms ===

Official coat of arms in Spain (23 June 1908 - 20 March 1975)

Coat of arms as Duke of Madrid, titular claimant to the Spanish throne (6 December 1949 - 29 July 1969)

Coat of arms as titular Dauphin of France, Legitimist claimant (6 September 1938 - 28 February 1941)

Coat of arms as Duke of Anjou, titular claimant to the French throne (28 February 1941 - 20 March 1975)

== Bibliography ==
- Zavala, José M. Don Jaime, el trágico Borbón: la maldición del hijo sordomudo de Alfonso XIII. Madrid: La Esfera de los Libros, 2006. ISBN 8497345657.
- Aranguren, Begoña. Emanuela de Dampierre: memorias, esposa y madre de los Borbones que pudieron reinar en España. Madrid: Esfera de los Libros, 2003. ISBN 8497341414.
- Pedersen, Jørgen. Riddere af Elefantordenen 1559–2009, Odense: Syddansk Universitetsforlag, 2009. ISBN 8776744345

Infante Jaime, Duke of Segovia House of Bourbon Cadet branch of the Capetian dynasty Born: 23 June 1908 Died: 20 March 1975
Titles in pretence
Preceded by Alfonso XIII	— TITULAR — King of France and Navarre; Legitimist; 28 February 1941 – 20 March 1975; Reason for succession failure: Bourbon monarchy deposed in 1830	Succeeded by Alfonso, Duke of Anjou and Cádiz
Preceded by Alfonso, Prince of Asturias	— TITULAR — Dauphin of France; Legitimist; 6 September 1938 - 28 February 1941	Succeeded by Alfonso, Duke of Anjou and Cádiz
