= Carsten Saft =

German neurologist and neuroscientist (born 1965)

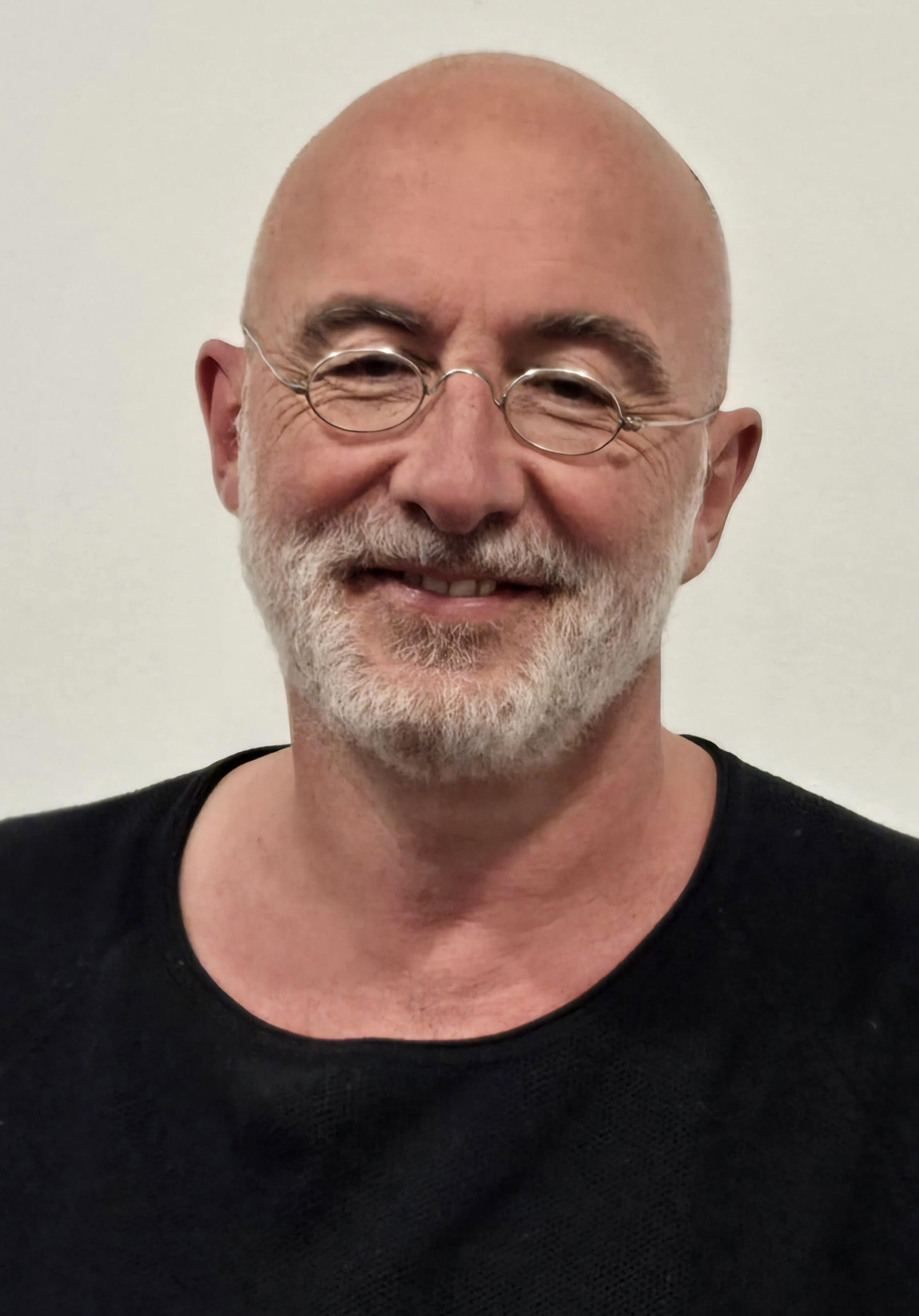
- Saft in 2025
- Born: Carsten Saft; 1965 (age 60–61); Minden, Germany
- Education: University of Mainz; University of Münster (MD, PhD); Hospital of the University of Pennsylvania (post Doc)
- Known for: Research into neurodegeneration, particularly Huntington disease
- Scientific career
- Fields: Neuroscience; Neurodegenerative diseases; Huntington's disease
- Workplaces: University Hospitals of the Ruhr-University of Bochum
- Thesis: (1997)
- Doctoral advisor: Erwin-Josef Speckmann
- Website: www.klinikum-bochum.de/fachbereiche/neurologie/prof-dr-med-carsten-saft.html

Carsten Saft (born 26 October 1965 in Minden, West Germany) is a German neurologist and neuroscientist specializing in neurodegenerative diseases and neurogenetics, particularly Huntington's disease.

== Early life and education ==
Saft studied human medicine from 1988 to 1996 at the Johannes Gutenberg University Mainz and the Westphalian Wilhelms University of Münster, including a study period in Philadelphia in the United States. In 1997 Saft received his Doctor of Medicine (Dr. med.) degree at Münster under Prof. Erwin-Josef Speckmann with a dissertation on the anti-epileptic effects of inorganic calcium antagonists on guinea pig hippocampal slices; he graduated summa cum laude and was awarded the University of Münster's dissertation prize for this work.

== Career ==
Saft began his medical career as a research assistant in 1996 at the Institute for Experimental Epilepsy Research in Münster. In January 1997 he joined the Department of Neurology at St. Josef Hospital in Bochum (Ruhr-University Bochum), where he completed his residency in neurology. He earned board certification in neurology in 2004. From 2002 to 2003, Saft worked as a project manager for neuroscience and multiple sclerosis research at the non-profit Hertie Foundation in Frankfurt am Main. He then underwent further training in psychiatry at the University of Münster from 2003 to 2004.

In 2006, Saft was appointed head of the clinical section of the Huntington-Zentrum NRW (Huntington Center North Rhine-Westphalia) at St. Josef Hospital in Bochum, which is part of the Catholic Clinics Bochum and affiliated with Ruhr University Bochum. He continues to lead this center, which provides specialized inpatient and outpatient care for Huntington's disease patients and their families. In 2007, after completing his habilitation in neurology at Ruhr University Bochum, Saft was awarded a three-year W2 endowed professorship in neurogenetics (funded by Teva Pharmaceutical Industries) at the university. He held this position from 2007 to 2010, focusing on Huntington's disease research. In 2013, Saft was granted the title of adjunct professor of neurology at Ruhr University Bochum, reflecting his continued academic teaching and research contributions (title awarded after his professorship term).

Throughout his career at Bochum, Saft has been instrumental in expanding Huntington's disease services. Under his leadership, the Huntington Center NRW became a unique facility in Germany, offering integrated neurological care including a dedicated Huntington inpatient ward, and psychiatric and psychosocial support in collaboration with partner hospitals, as well as genetic diagnostics in cooperation with the department of human genetics (director Huu Phuc Nguyen). In 2018, the center's significance was recognized by the state government of North Rhine-Westphalia, which granted approximately €5 million to the Catholic Clinic Bochum to enhance care and research for Huntington's and other rare diseases. Saft has also served as specialist for movement disorders at St. Josef Hospital, overseeing clinical services for Parkinson's and other movement disorder patients alongside Huntington's disease care.

== Research and scientific contributions ==
Saft's research focuses on biomarker development using motor tests such as tapping and speaking tests, functional MRI and event-related potentials as well as peripheral pathology, pathophysiology and therapy for Huntington's disease. His lab mainly investigates the role of neuroimmunological prozesses in Huntington's disease. Moreover he is an expert in the differential diagnosis of different chorea forms.

As a principal investigator, Saft has been involved in numerous clinical trials for Huntington's disease. He has participated in all major therapeutic trials for Huntington's in the past two decades. Notably, he was one of the investigators in the first-in-human trial of an antisense oligonucleotide drug (IONIS-HTTRx) aimed at lowering huntingtin protein levels, conducted in 2015–2017 under the international leadership of Prof. Sarah Tabrizi. Saft's center in Bochum was one of three sites in Germany for this groundbreaking study, which demonstrated for the first time that a therapy could reduce mutant huntingtin protein in patients. The results, published in the New England Journal of Medicine in 2019, were hailed as a milestone in Huntington's research, although Saft cautioned patients about maintaining realistic expectations until larger trials could prove clinical benefit.

Saft has co-authored over 200 scientific publications, including research on neuroimaging changes in pre-symptomatic Huntington's gene carriers and experimental treatments for Huntington's disease. He has collaborated with international consortia such as the European Huntington's Disease Network (EHDN) on observational studies (REGISTRY and Enroll-HD) and investigational therapies. In addition, Saft was the lead author of the German clinical guidelines on Huntington's disease (Chorea Huntington) in 2010, and he oversaw their subsequent updates in 2017 and 2022 in conjunction with the German Neurological Society (DGN). These consensus guidelines provided recommendations on diagnosis and management of Huntington's disease, including genetic testing protocols and symptom-directed treatments, and have been disseminated to physicians in Germany, Austria and Switzerland. Saft also serves on the editorial board of the Journal of Huntington's Disease and has been an editorial reviewer for other neurology journals, contributing to the dissemination and critical review of new research in his field.

== Public and advisory roles ==
Saft is actively involved in professional and patient organizations related to neurodegenerative diseases. He has been a member of the Scientific Advisory Board (Wissenschaftlicher Beirat) of the German Huntington's Disease Association (Deutsche Huntington-Hilfe e.V., DHH) since 2005. In this role, he regularly provides expert updates on research developments to the Huntington's patient community, often together with Bernhard Landwehrmeyer. For example, Saft has given educational talks and Q&A sessions for patients and families, such as the "Meet the HD Experts" online seminar hosted by the DHH in 2023. He is also a member of the Huntington Foundation in Germany and has served on its Board of Trustees (Stiftungsrat) in 2013 to 2024, where he helps guide and fund research and support projects. Within the DHH advisory board, Saft has led the working group on research ("AG Forschung"), coordinating scientific information and advising the patient organization on research priorities.

At the international level, Saft has played significant advisory roles in Huntington's disease networks. From 2014 to 2019, he was an elected member of the Scientific and Bioethics Advisory Committee (SBAC) of the European Huntington's Disease Network. He served as Co-Chair of the SBAC in 2016 and as Chair in 2017–2018, leading the committee that evaluates and oversees research proposals within the pan-European network. In these positions, Saft helped shape research strategy and ethical guidelines for multi-center studies across Europe. He is also a member of EHDN's clinical trial task force; notably, he sat on the steering committee of the REGISTRY longitudinal study and on the steering committee for a clinical trial of deep brain stimulation (DBS) in Huntington's disease. In 2022, Saft became the Huntington's disease representative in the European Reference Network for Rare Neurological Diseases (ERN-RND), serving as the clinical expert for the Bochum center which is one of the ERN-RND designated HD specialist sites. In this capacity, he contributes to Europe-wide standards of care and case discussions for chorea and Huntington's disease patients.

Saft has also been active in scientific societies. He is a member of the German Parkinson and Movement Disorders Society (DPG), the German Society of Neurogenetics and the German Neurological Society (DGN), through which he was appointed to lead the guideline committees for Huntington's disease as noted above. His leadership in developing national guidelines and participating in expert panels has been recognized as helping to improve the quality of care for Huntington's disease in Germany.

== Musical career ==
Outside of medicine, Carsten Saft is a passionate jazz and fusion musician. He plays in a jazz-fusion ensemble named “You Probably”, a project he formed together with Irish-born blues musician Matt Walsh (sax, trompet, trombone), German drummer Bernd Rath, and the bassist known as “Andreoid”, followed by Max Willers. Saft contributed as a guitarist and composer to the group’s debut album Don’t, which was released in late 2023. The album, credited to “You Probably – A Matt Walsh, Bernd Rath, Andreoid and Carsten Saft Project,” features twelve tracks blending elements of jazz, blues, and progressive rock, and was made available on streaming platforms in December 2023. In October 2025 a second album entitled Dance followed. Saft had been active in music since his youth and often performed in local jazz bands during his university years, though 2023 and 2025 releases marked his first professional recordings. In interviews, he has mentioned music as an important creative outlet that complements his scientific work, providing balance and a different form of expression.

== Personal life ==
Saft lives in Bochum, Germany. He has one daughter (born c.2005). His father, Jürgen Saft (born 1943), was a public servant and later a trade union official. Jürgen Saft was also involved in local politics as a member of the Social Democratic Party (SPD): he served on the district council (Kreistag) of Minden-Lübbecke from 1997 to 2009. He was also a member of the SPD Party Council ("SPD Parteirat") and a candidate for the first European Parliament in 1979. Carsten Saft credits his family background for instilling in him a strong sense of social responsibility; he has noted that seeing his father's community engagement influenced his own commitment to patient advocacy in his career.
