= Speckmann =

Speckmann or Speckman is a German surname, which is a habitational name for a person who lived near a swamp or specke in Middle Low German, or a locational surname for a person from German villages named Specke or Specken. The name may refer to:

- Bettina Speckmann (born 1972), German computer scientist, daughter of Erwin-Josef
- Diedrich Speckmann (1874–1938), German writer
- Erwin-Josef Speckmann (born 1939), German neuroscientist, father of Bettina
- Mark Speckman (born 1955), American football coach
- Paul Speckmann (born 1963), American musician
- Rosko Specman (born 1989), South African rugby player
