= Charlotte Tiedemann =

German opera singer and actress (1919–1979)

Charlotte
- Duchess of Segovia and Anjou
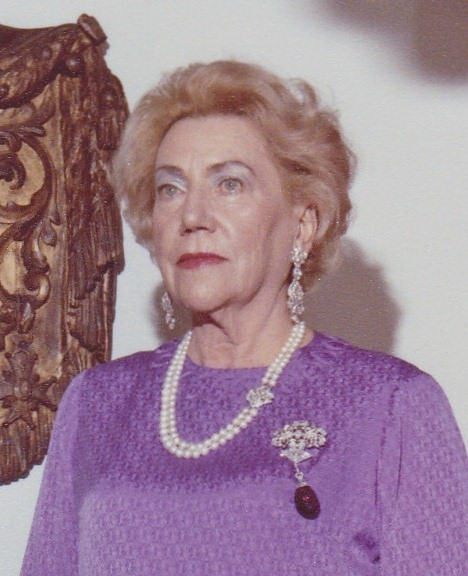
- Charlotte in 1979, shortly before her death
- Born: 2 January 1919; Königsberg, Weimar Republic
- Died: 3 July 1979 (aged 60); West Berlin, West Germany
- Burial: Waldfriedhof Zehlendorf
- Spouse: Franz Büchler (divorced); Fritz Hippler (divorced); Infante Jaime, Duke of Segovia (m. 1949; died 1975)
- Issue: Helga Hippler
Names
- Charlotte Luise Auguste Tiedemann
- House: Bourbon (by marriage)
- Father: Otto Tiedemann
- Mother: Luise Klein
- Occupation: singer, actress

Charlotte Luise Auguste Tiedemann (2 January 1919 – 3 July 1979) was a German opera singer, actress, and the second wife of Infante Jaime, Duke of Segovia, who was the second son of Alfonso XIII, King of Spain, and Princess Victoria Eugenie of Battenberg.

== Early life ==
Tiedemann was born on 2 January 1919 in Königsberg, Germany (now part of Russia) to Otto Eugen Tiedemann and Luise Amalia Klein.

== Career ==
She performed as a mezzo-soprano in Berlin. There were rumors that she had been a Nazi spy during her marriage. She worked with the operetta librettist Heinz Hentschke, who was a cultural official in Nazi Germany.

Tiedemann moved to Rome in 1944 to work for a radio program for German soldiers fighting in World War II.

She signed a contract with German film studio UFA and worked on the film Titanic and appeared in Italian cinema using the stage name Micaela Carlotta.

== Marriages ==
She married, firstly, to the German sound engineer Franz Büchler, with whom she had a daughter, Helga. She married a second time to the German filmmaker Fritz Hippler, who was a colleague of Nazi official Joseph Goebbels. Hippler legally adopted her daughter. Tiedemann's husband directed the film The Eternal Jew, a documentary that summarized antisemitic ideology in Nazism. She accompanied her husband to the home of Adolf Hitler. She and Hippler later divorced.

In 1947, while in Rome, she met Infante Jaime, Duke of Segovia, the son of the king of Spain, at Il Faro restaurant. On 3 August 1949, she married Infante Jaime in a civil ceremony in Innsbruck, Austria. Her husband was the Legitimist pretender to the former French throne.

Her husband had obtained a divorce from his first wife, Emmanuelle de Dampierre, that was recognized in Italy but not in France, Spain, or the Vatican. The Spanish royal family refused to recognize the marriage and banned Tiedemann from attending any family events. She used the title Duchess of Segovia, but the Spanish monarchy refused to grant her the title, instead recognizing Infante Jaime's first wife as the duchess.
