= Duke of Segovia =

Title in Spanish peerage

Dukedom of Segovia
- Arms of the Infante Jaime, Duke of Segovia
- Creation date: 23 June 1933
- Creation: First
- Created by: Alfonso XIII
- Peerage: Peerage of Spain
- First holder: Infante Jaime
- Last holder: Infante Jaime

Duke of Segovia, named after the city of Segovia, was a substantive title. It was created on 23 June 1933 by King Alfonso XIII, as the reason for the Infante Jaime renounced his rights to the defunct Spanish throne for himself and his descendants. It does not include any territorial landholdings and does not produce any revenue for the title-holder.

== Dukes of Segovia ==
=== First creation, 1933–1975 ===
Dukes	Portrait	Birth	Marriage(s)	Death
Infante Jaime; House of Bourbon; 1933–1975	Infante Jaime	23 June 1908; Royal Palace of La Granja de San Ildefonso, Segovia, Spain son of King Alfonso XIII and Queen Victoria Eugenie of Battenberg	Emmanuelle de Dampierre; 1935–1947; Charlotte Tiedemann; 1949–1975	20 March 1975; Kantonsspital St. Gallen, St. Gallen, Switzerland aged 66
