= Eduardo Urbano Merino =

Mexican painter and sculptor (born 1975)

- Born: October 8, 1975 (age 51); Mexico City
- Education: Academy of San Carlos
- Known for: Visual arts
- Website: eduardourbano.com

Eduardo Urbano Merino is a Mexican painter and sculptor. One of his most known works is the painting "Epilepsia, Dejando Atrás la Pesadilla" (Epilepsy, Leaving Behind the Nightmare), which is currently in permanent exhibition at the main lobby of the Royal University Hospital in Saskatchewan, Canada. His work is figurative surreal and hyperrealistic.

== Background ==
Urbano Merino studied at the Academy of San Carlos in Mexico City. As a student, he excelled in human anatomy, composition, perspective and painting techniques.

He sold his first painting professionally at the age of 16.

In 2011, Urbano Merino created a 2.06 meters bronze sculpture La Justicia (The Justice). Using the classic iconography of justice but creating a new style that recalls the work of Antonio Gaudi and his liquid architecture. The sculpture got recognition from Law Schools in Canada, England and the United States following the publication of an essay by Charalee Graydon in 2013.

Urbano Merino participated in an auction in October 2012 at the Soumaya Museum for the "Proyecto TAM", a project dedicated to buy shoes for children living in poor rural areas in Mexico.

In 2012 he was commissioned to paint one of the murals to celebrate the Bicentennial of Independence of Mexico. He created a 5x10 meter oil painting. It was installed in a place open to the public in Hidalgo Mexico. The same year he was commissioned to create a sculpture to celebrate the Mexican College of Rheumatology's tenth anniversary. He made a sculpture, called Esperanza y Plenitud (Hope and Fulfillment), which was unveiled on in October 2013 at the Chapultepec Castle in Mexico City. The sculpture is about rheumatoid arthritis and it is displayed at the Mexican College of Rheumatology in permanent exhibition.

Urbano Merino painted "Epilepsia, Dejando Atrás la Pesadilla" (Epilepsy, Leaving Behind the Nightmare), which became one of his most known works, in 2013. The painting was exhibited during the International Epilepsy Congress in Montreal, June 2013. The painting was published with other pieces depicting epilepsy surgery in a special article in the journal Epilepsy & Behavior and was used as the cover of the journal. The original painting is in a permanent exhibition at the main lobby of the Royal University Hospital in Saskatchewan Canada. In May 2015, International Innovation, a publication in UK highlighted the picture in their magazine. The painting has also been used in other medical journals.
