= Gonzalo, Duke of Aquitaine =

Spanish royal (1937–2000)

Gonzalo de Borbón y Dampierre; Gonzalve de Bourbon
- Arms of the Duke of Aquitaine (1972–2000).

Duke of Aquitaine
- Tenure: 21 September 1972 – 27 May 2000
- Born: Don Gonzalo Víctor Alfonso José Bonifacio Antonio María y Todos los Santos de Borbón y Dampierre and Gonzalve Victor Alphonse Joseph Boniface Antoine Marie et Toussaint de Bourbon; 5 June 1937; Sant'Anna Clinic, Rome, Italy
- Died: 27 May 2000 (aged 62); Lausanne, Switzerland
- Buried: Las Descalzas Reales
- Noble family: House of Bourbon
- Spouses: María del Carmen Harto y Montealegre (m. 1983; div. 1983) María de las Mercedes Licer y García (m. 1984; div. 1989) Emanuela Maria Pratolongo (m. 1992)
- Issue: Stephanie Michelle de Borbón
- Father: Infante Jaime, Duke of Anjou and Segovia
- Mother: Emmanuelle de Dampierre, Duchess of Anjou and Segovia

Don Gonzalo, Duke of Aquitaine (5 June 1937 – 27 May 2000) (Spanish: Gonzalo Víctor Alfonso José Bonifacio Antonio María y Todos los Santos de Borbón y Dampierre; French: Gonzalve Victor Alphonse Joseph Boniface Antoine Marie Toussaint de Bourbon) was a grandson of Alfonso XIII, King of Spain.

== Life ==
Gonzalo was born in the Sant'Anna Clinic in Rome on 5 June 1937, the younger son of Infante Jaime, Duke of Segovia and his first wife, Emmanuelle de Dampierre. He was baptised in the chapel of the hospital where he had been born.

In 1941, after the death of his paternal grandfather Alfonso XIII, Gonzalo moved with his family to Lausanne, Switzerland. They lived first at the Hotel Royal before Gonzalo and his older brother Alfonso were sent to the Collège Saint-Jean in Fribourg. On 8 December 1946, Gonzalo received his First Communion and was confirmed by Cardinal Pedro Segura y Sáenz, Archbishop of Seville.

In 1953, Gonzalo visited Spain for the first time. The following year, General Francisco Franco allowed Gonzalo and Alfonso to continue their education in Spain.

In September 1955, Gonzalo and Alfonso were both injured in an automobile accident near Lausanne, on a return trip from Windsor during which they had driven all day and night.

In December 1959, Gonzalo's engagement to Dorothy Marguerite Fritz of San Francisco, daughter of Nicholas Eugene Fritz Jr., was announced. A wealthy heiress, she owned the Huntington Hotel. The marriage never took place.

In November 1961, Alfonso and Gonzalo, concerned that their father was wasting away his money, sought an injunction from a French court to compel him to turn over management of his affairs to a court-appointed trustee, being supported in their action by their grandmother, Queen Victoria Eugenie, as well as by other members of the Spanish royal family. In January 1962, the court ruled that although there were insufficient grounds to find Jaime completely incompetent, a trustee was installed to restrain undue extravagance on his part.

On 28 January 1983, at Puerto Vallarta, Mexico, Gonzalo married María del Carmen Harto y Montealegre (born 23 April 1947 in Toledo) in a civil ceremony. They were divorced less than three months later, 13 April, before the marriage had been registered in Spain.

Arms of Emanuela, Duchess of Aquitaine (since 1995).

In June 1984, Gonzalo married a model, María de las Mercedes Licer y García (born at Valencia 15 October 1963), in a civil service at Madrid on 25 June 1984 and in a religious ceremony at Olmedo, near Valladolid five days later. They separated 3 July 1985, divorced civilly 3 July 1986 which became final 31 January 1989, and Gonzalo was granted annulment by the Vatican at Florence in May 1995. Prior to that annulment, he became engaged to the actress Marcia Bell, but the couple did not marry. On 12 December 1992 in Genoa, Italy, Gonzalo was married in a civil ceremony to Emanuela Maria Pratolongo (born Genoa, 22 March 1960), daughter of Vincenzo Pratolongo and Sofia Hardouin dei duchi di Gallese. Following Gonzalo's annulment from the previous marriage, the couple were married religiously 17 September 1995 in Rome.

Gonzalo had no children from any of his marriages. He did, however, have an illegitimate, but acknowledged daughter, Stephanie Michelle de Borbón (born 19 June 1968 in Miami, Florida) by Sandra Lee Landry, who was married 27 July 1995 to Richard Carl McMasters II (born Florida, 25 March 1972). They have five sons, two of whom were born before their marriage and all of whom were born in Florida:

- Nicholas Stefano Alessandro McMasters de Borbón (born 1994)
- Christian Alfonso McMasters de Borbón (born 1995)
- Jaime Sebastian McMasters de Borbón (born 1996)
- Richard Carl McMasters III de Borbón (born 1998)
- Alexander Leandro Joaquin Gonzalo McMasters de Borbón (born 2004)

Gonzalo died of leukemia at Lausanne on 27 May 2000. He is buried in the Chapel of Saint Sebastian in the church of the Descalzas Reales in Madrid.

== Rank and titles ==
In 1972, his uncle the Count of Barcelona invited him to the wedding of his daughter Margarita; the invitation did not recognise the royal rank of Gonzalo who wrote a letter of protest to his uncle.

On 8 March 1972, Jaime named Gonzalo a knight of the Order of the Holy Spirit and of the Order of Saint Michael; the declarative letters patent were dated 21 September 1972. Also on 21 September 1972, Jaime gave Gonzalo the title duc d'Aquitaine (Duke of Aquitaine).

== Ancestors ==
Ancestors of Gonzalo, Duke of Aquitaine

16. King Consort Francis of Spain
8. King Alfonso XII of Spain
17. Isabella II, Queen of Spain
4. Alfonso XIII, King of Spain
18. Archduke Karl Ferdinand of Austria
9. Archduchess Maria Christina of Austria
19. Archduchess Elisabeth Franziska of Austria
2. Infante Jaime, Duke of Segovia
20. Prince Alexander of Hesse and by Rhine
10. Prince Henry of Battenberg
21. Countess Julia Hauke, Princess von Battenberg
5. Princess Victoria Eugenie of Battenberg
22. Prince Albert of Saxe-Coburg and Gotha
11. Princess Beatrice of the United Kingdom
23. Victoria, Queen of the United Kingdom
1. Gonzalo, Duke of Aquitaine
24. Henri, vicomte de Dampierre
12. Richard de Dampierre, 1st Duc de San Lorenzo
25. Elizabeth Tayloe Corbin
6. Roger de Dampierre, 2nd Duc de San Lorenzo
26. Pierre Étienne Carraby
13. Jeanne Marie Carraby
27. Marie Marguerite Ybry
3. Emmanuelle de Dampierre
28. Prince Don Bartolomeo Ruspoli
14. Don Emanuele Ruspoli, 1st Principe di Poggio Suasa
29. Carolina Ratti
7. Donna Vittoria Ruspoli dei principi di Poggio Suasa
30. Joseph David Beers-Curtis
15. Josephine Mary Beers-Curtis
31. Elizabeth Shipton-Giles
