= Harold Speakman =

American poet and travel writer (1888–1928)

Harold Dunham Speakman (November 30, 1888 – September 24, 1928) was an early twentieth-century American author and artist, best known for the travel narratives Here’s Ireland (1925) and Mostly Mississippi (1927).

== Early life and education ==
Harold Speakman was born on November 30, 1888, in the Greenville section of Jersey City, New Jersey. His mother, Virginia Brandreth Dunham, was the eldest daughter of the publisher Oscar Mortimer Dunham, president of Cassell and Company in New York. Harold's father, William Allibone Speakman Jr., died less than one year after his birth, in November 1889.

After her husband's death, Virginia and Harold moved to Milwaukee, Wisconsin. In 1897, Virginia married William Dennis Reed, the assistant secretary of Northwestern National Insurance Company; he later became the president of the company. They had several more children, one of whom, Philip Dunham Reed, became chairman of General Electric.

Speakman attended West Division High School in Milwaukee and then studied painting and illustration at the Art Institute of Chicago. From 1911 to 1913, he studied art in Munich and Paris under Jean Paul Laurens. He was an instructor at the Art Institute before the war. His first publications as an illustrator were with the Abingdon Press, the publication branch of the United Methodist Church. He also published a book of religious-themed poems, Songs of Hope, in 1917.

== Military service and marriage ==
Beginning in August 1917, Speakman served as a Second Lieutenant with the 332nd Infantry, the only American regiment assigned to the Italian front in World War I. He was honorably discharged in 1919. His experiences in the war are chronicled in the book From a Soldier’s Heart (1919).

After the war, he traveled to China (1920–1921), Palestine (1921–1922), Ireland (1923–1924), and India (1928). Each except the final trip to India resulted in nonfiction narratives.

In July 1925, he married the artist Frances Russell Lindsay (known professionally as Russell Lindsay Speakman) from Topeka, Kansas, who had been his student at the Art Institute before the war. In August 1926, they began a seven-month river journey that followed the Mississippi River from its source at Lake Itasca to New Orleans, an adventure is recounted in Mostly Mississippi, A Very Damp Adventure. The book describes the river and its people before the devastating flood of 1927 and offers short verbal portraits of Laura Frazer (the inspiration for Mark Twain's Becky Thatcher), Irish poet Padraic Colum, and author statesman William Alexander Percy. Florence Finch Kelly lauded the book in a review for the New York Times, praising the writing and the illustrations.

== Death ==
The morning of September 24, 1928, Speakman died of a self-inflicted gunshot wound at Bellevue Hospital. Harold's step-brother Philip told the New York Times that Speakman had been in ill health for six months and “threatened several times to take his own life.”

Speakman's body was cremated. Frances remained in Manhattan, employed by the WPA as a mural painter until moving to Fort Lauderdale, Florida in the 1950s to live near her sister. She died in 1988 and is buried in Topeka.

== Publications ==
=== Author ===
- Silent Night: A Song of Christmas. New York, Cincinnati: Abingdon Press, 1914. Reprint by Abingdon Press, 1927.
- I Think When I Read That Sweet Story of Old. New York, Cincinnati: Abingdon Press, 1915.
- The First Easter. New York, Cincinnati: Abingdon Press, 1917.
- The Youngest Shepherd: A Poem of Bethlehem. New York: Dodge Publishing Co., 1917.
- Songs of Hope. New York: Thomas Y. Crowell Company, 1917.
- From a Soldier’s Heart. New York, Cincinnati: Abingdon Press, 1919.
- Beyond Shanghai. New York, Cincinnati: Abingdon Press, 1922.
- Hilltops in Galilee. New York, Cincinnati: Abingdon Press, 1923.
- This Above All. Indianapolis: Bobbs Merrill, 1924.
- Here’s Ireland. New York: Dodd, Mead and Company, 1925.
- Mostly Mississippi. New York: Arrowsmith, 1927. Republished by University of Minnesota Press, 2004.
- Once at Christmas. New York, Cincinnati: Abingdon Press, 1928.

=== Illustrator ===
- The First Christmas. New York, Cincinnati: Abingdon Press, 1915.
- The Forest Filled with Friends, by Raymond Macdonald Alden. Indianapolis: Bobbs-Merrill Company, 1915.
- O Love That Wilt Not Let Me Go, by George Matheson. New York, Cincinnati: Abingdon Press, 1915.
- The Rubáiyát of a Bachelor, by Helen Rowland. New York: Dodge Publishing Co., 1915.
- Gifts From the Desert, by Frederick B. Fisher. New York, Cincinnati: Abingdon Press, 1916.
- What the Stars Saw, and Other Bible Stories, by Caroline Kellogg. Indianapolis: Bobbs-Merrill Company, 1916.
- A Guide to Men: Being Encore Reflections of a Bachelor Girl, by Helen Rowland. New York: Dodge Publishing Co., 1922.
- Stories From the Life of Jesus, Told for Little Children, by Caroline Kellogg. Indianapolis: Bobbs-Merrill Company, 1922.
- The Story of Methodism, by Halford Luccock and Paul Hutchinson. New York, Cincinnati: The Methodist Book Concern, 1926.
- "If"; also, The White Woman's Burden, by Helen Rowland. New York: Dodge Publishing Co., 1927.
- This Married Life, by Helen Rowland. New York: Dodge Publishing Co., 1927.
