= Palazzo Ruspoli =

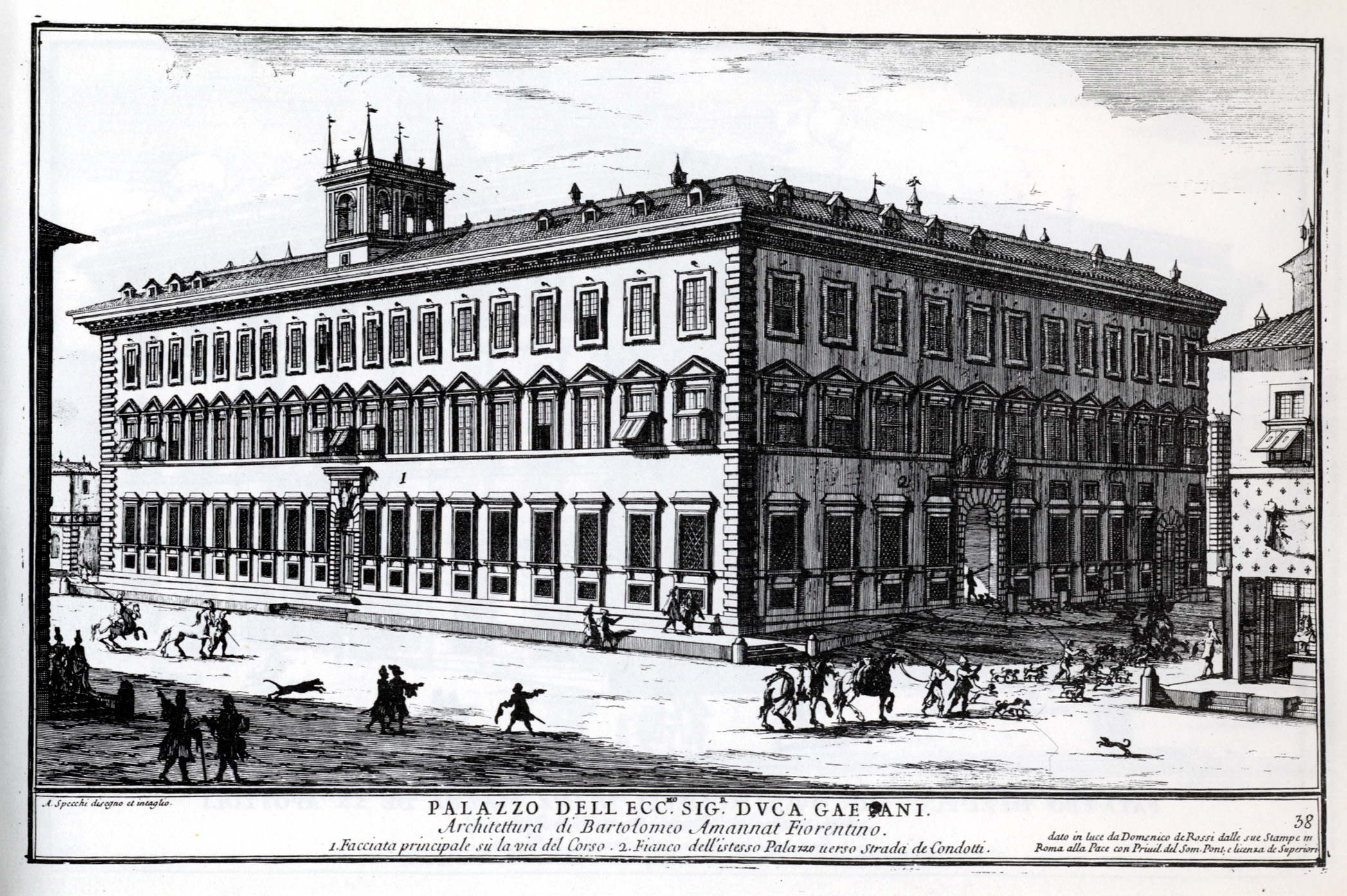
- Veduta of Gaetani Palace in 1699, with roofline viewing tower
- Click on the map for a fullscreen view

General information
- Location: Rome, Italy
- Coordinates: 41°54′15″N 12°28′43″E
- Owner: Ruspoli family

The Palazzo Ruspoli is a Renaissance-style, 16th century aristocratic palace located on Via del Corso 418, where Corso intersects with Largo Carlo Goldoni and the Piazza di San Lorenzo in Lucina, in the Rione IV of Campo Marzio in central Rome, Italy.

== Description ==
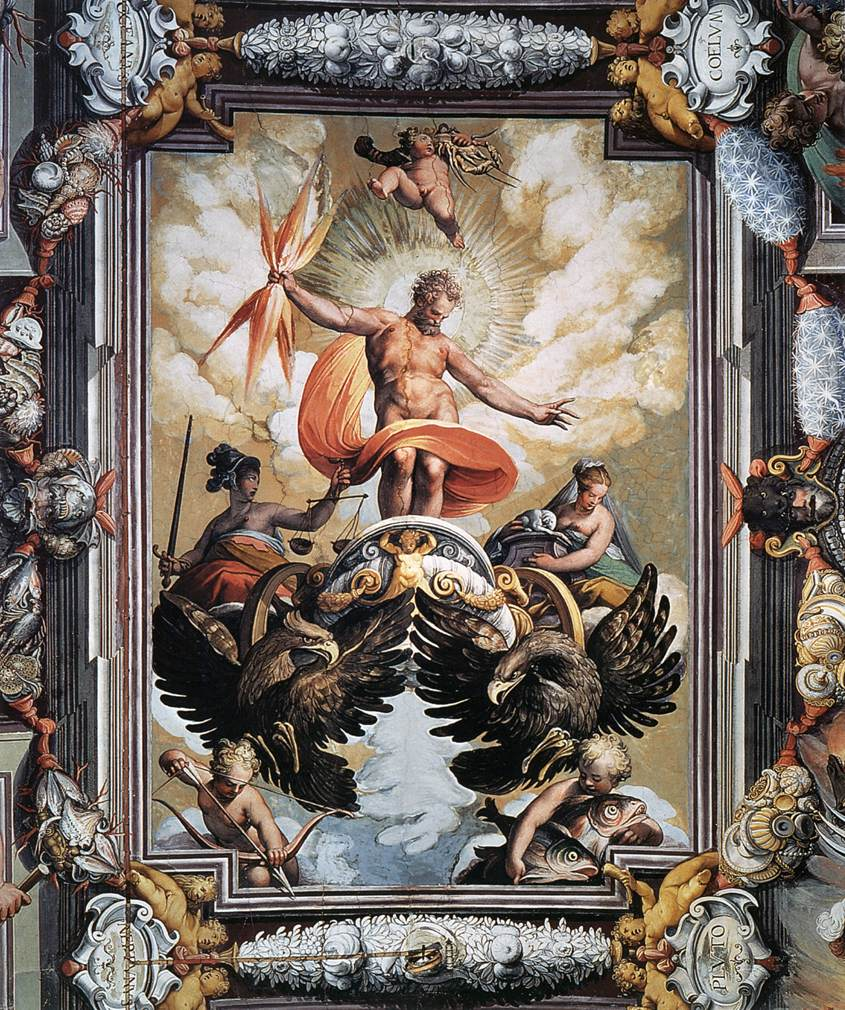
Zucchi's frescoes on gallery ceiling

By the 16th century, the site of the palace was home to the Jacobbili family, and in 1583, it was sold to the Florentine mercantile family of the Rucellai. They commissioned completion of the palace from Bartolomeo Ammannati. He consolidated the long three-story facade along via de Corso and added a loggia along the inner courtyard, frescoed by Jacopo Zucchi and used to display the family's ancient sculpture collection.

In 1629, the palace was acquired by the Caetani or Gaetani family, who commissioned a refurbishment of the facade along what is now Largo Goldoni. Circa 1640, the architect Martino Longhi the Younger was commissioned to build the scenographic staircase leading to the courtyard. In 1776, the palace became property of the Ruspoli family, who still own parts of the structure to this day. In the 19th century, the palace hosted the famed Caffè Nuovo, and it was also home to the exiled Napoleon III.

A description of the staircase in the 18th century noted that the staircase was singular among palaces in Rome for its size and for being constructed entirely of marble steps, costing 80 scudi each, arrayed in four flights of 30 steps, ten feet long and two feet wide. Along the stairs were antique busts of emperors Hadrian and Claudius; Bacchus and Silen; Apollo; Mercury; a woman dressed as Hercules; and Aesclepius.

== Notable people ==
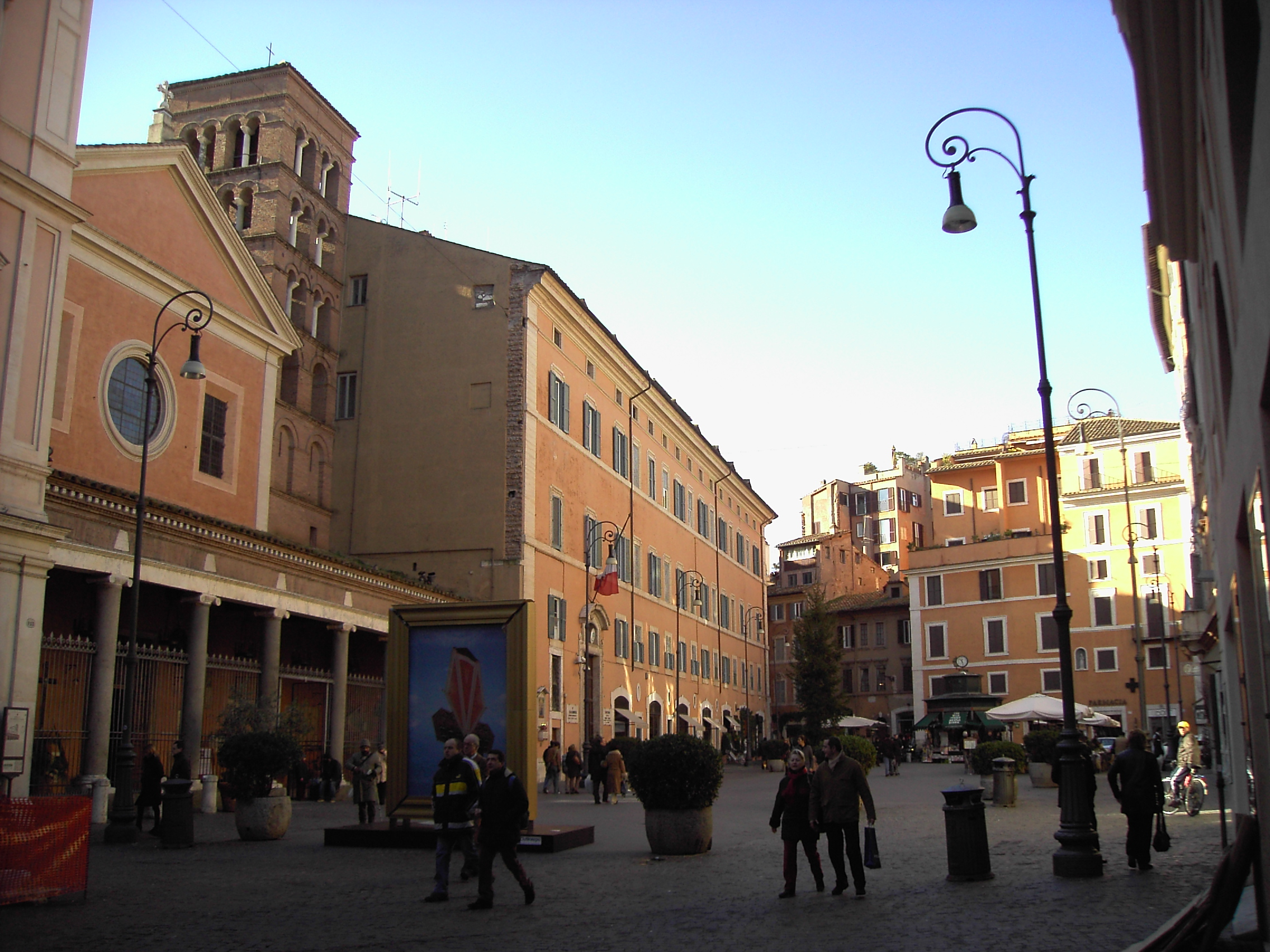
San Lorenzo in Lucina and Palazzo Ruspoli

- María Ernestina Larráinzar Córdoba (1854-1925), Italian-born Mexican writer, teacher, religious order founder
- Emmanuelle de Dampierre, Duchess of Anjou and Segovia (1913-2012)

== See also ==
- History of palace in website for boutique hotel on premises, Palazzo Ruspoli Napoleon

Preceded by Palazzo Corsini, Rome	Landmarks of Rome; Palazzo Ruspoli, Rome	Succeeded by Palazzo Spada
