= Manuel Larráinzar =

Mexican conservative politician

Minister of Justice
- President: Miguel Miramón

Ambassador of Mexico to the United States
- In office 22 May 1852 – 1 July 1853
- Preceded by: Luis de la Rosa Oteiza
- Succeeded by: Juan Nepomuceno Almonte

Personal details
- Born: 26 December 1809 Ciudad Real (nowadays San Cristóbal de las Casas), Chiapas
- Died: 11 September 1884 (aged 74) Mexico City
- Children: María Ernestina Larráinzar Córdoba (daughter)
- Education: San Ildefonso College

Manuel Larráinzar Piñero (26 December 1809 – 11 September 1884) was a Mexican conservative politician who served as minister of Justice in the cabinet of Interim President Miguel Miramón and as magistrate and counsellor of state to Emperor Maximilian of Mexico.

== Works ==
- Biografía de D. Fray Bartolomé de las Casas (1837).
- La cuestión de Tehuantepec (1852).
- Estudios sobre la historia de América, sus ruinas y su antigüedad (1875).
