= University Hospital Bonn =

Coordinates: 50°42′6.1″N 7°6′11.2″E

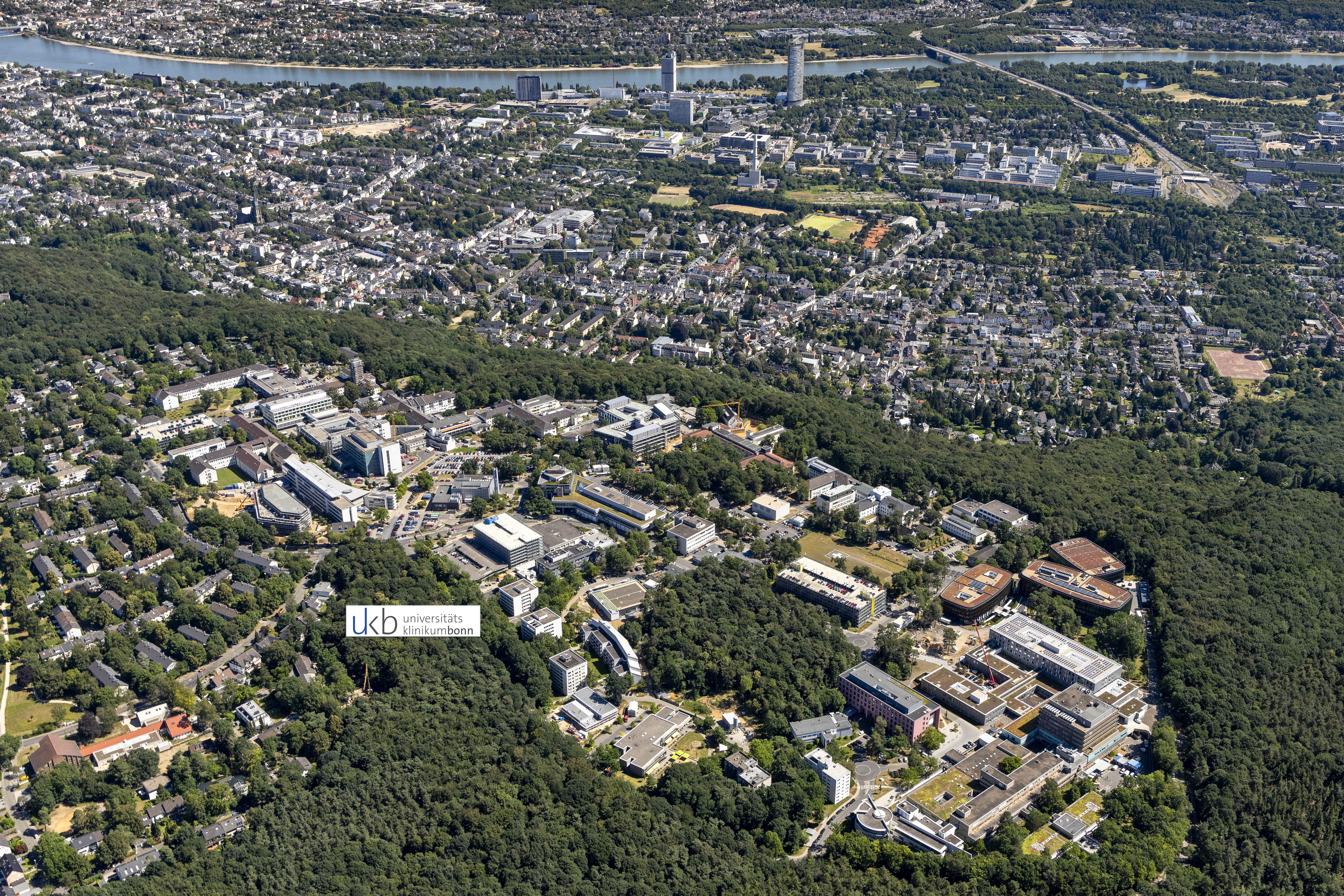

Geography
- Location: Bonn, Germany

Organisation
- Type: Teaching
- Affiliated university: University of Bonn

Services
- Beds: 1,306 (2022)

History
- Founded: 1818

Links
- Website: www.ukbonn.de
- Employees: approx. 8,500 (2022)
- CEO: Prof. Dr. med. Dr. h.c. mult. Wolfgang Holzgreve, MBA

Structure of the University Hospital Bonn

The University Hospital Bonn is a maximum care hospital with more than 1306 planned beds. Our more than 8,500 employees perform tasks in research, teaching and patient care as well as in public health at the highest level.

== History ==
At the same time as the Prussian founding of the Rheinische Friedrich-Wilhelms-Universität Bonn in 1818, the first chairs and clinics were established for internal medicine, surgery and obstetrics, among others. Due to the increased need for space, these clinics later moved to new buildings on Theaterstraße in the area of today's Beethovenhalle during the German Empire.

After World War II, the University Hospital Bonn moved to a large area on the Venusberg in the middle of the Kotten Forest, and now only the Forensic Medicine Institute, the Diamorphine Outpatient Clinic, the Preclinical Institutes and the Dental Clinic of the UKB remain in the city outside the Venusberg campus. Since 2001, Bonn University Hospital has been independent with its own supervisory board. It is managed by a five-member board of directors. Prof. Dr. med. Dr. h.c. mult. Wolfgang Holzgreve, MBA, has been chairman of the board since 2012.

== Structure ==
Key figures on the UKB (as of 2021)

- Over 1,150 physicians, full-time equivalents
- Over 2,000 nursing staff, full-time equivalents
- 38 clinics
- 31 institutes
- over 450,000 patients
- about 50,000 emergencies
- over 3,000 deliveries
- 585 trainees in health care professions

Nursing at the UKB (as of 2021)

- Nursing service: 1444 full-time employees
- Non-scientific. Med. Techn. service: 1,330 full staff
- Functional service: 621 full staff
- Staff of the training centers: 35 fulltime equivalents
- The training center for nursing professions has modern media equipment and skills labs and is tailored to the various training courses.
- Global Skill Partnership: In Mexico, 30 candidates are participating in the "Global Skill Partnership" project and will start working at UKB in 2022.

Rankings and Case Mix Index (CMI).

- In the current Focus Health Clinic List 2022, which refers to the 2021 evaluation, Bonn University Hospital was listed in first place among hospitals in North Rhine-Westphalia.
- In the F.A.Z. Institute's ranking "Top Employers - Innovative. Digital. Sustainable", Bonn University Hospital was listed in first place among public hospitals in Germany.
- The UKB is ranked first among university hospitals (UK) in NRW in the science ranking (LOMV).
- UKB had the third highest case mix index in 2022 and was the only one of the 35 German university hospitals to have an increase in performance in the Corona years 2020 and 2021.

== Research Networks ==
Genetic Medicine and Genetic Epidemiology

- BMBF NGFN+ Affective Disorders and Schizophrenia (M. Nöthen)
- BMBF Rare Diseases Network "CURE-Net" (Reutter)
- E-Rare Angioedema (S. Cichon)
- German Cancer Aid Collaborative Project Familial Colorectal Cancer (Founder Peter Propping †)
- W3-Professorship Genomic Statistics and Bioinformatics (State of NRW) (Krawitz)

Neurosciences

- DFG-SFB/TR 3: Mesial Temporal Lobe Epilepsies (expiring 2012) (Steinhäuser)
- DFG Clinical Research Unit KFO 177: Innate Immunity in Chronic Neurodegeneration (2007-2013) (Heneka, Klockgether)[3].
- DFG Research Unit FOR 926: Pathology and Pathophysiology of the Endocannabinoid System (re-evaluated 2011) (Zimmer).
- BMBF-BioPharma-Competition Biopharma-Neuroalliance: New Drug Targets and Protection Strategies for Neurodegenerative Diseases - Identification of microRNAs and their target mRNAs (2009-2012) (Pfeifer; Müller, Faculty of Mathematics and Natural Sciences)
- BMBF Competence Network Degenerative Dementias (KNDD) (re-evaluation 2010) (Maier).
- E-Rare International Network for Spinocerebellar Ataxias (RISCA) (re-review 2011) (Klockgether).
