= María Ernestina Larráinzar Córdoba =

Mexican writer and teacher

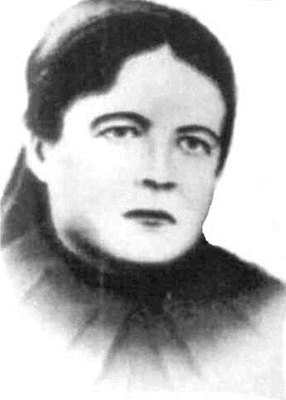
María Ernestina Larráinzar Córdoba (ca. 1900)

María Ernestina Larráinzar Córdoba (23 October 1854 – 16 January 1925) was an Italian-born Mexican writer and teacher. Along with her sister Josefina, they founded the religious order, Congregación Hijas del Calvario (Congregation of Missionary Daughters of Calvary).

== Biography ==
Ernestina Larráinzar Córdoba was born in the Palazzo Ruspoli in Rome, Italy, on October 23, 1854. She was the daughter of the Guatemalan Manuela Córdoba and the Chiapas diplomat, Manuel Larráinzar. She had two brothers and two sisters, Enriqueta and Josefina. In 1866, her father was appointed plenipotentiary Minister of the courts of Russia, Sweden and Denmark by Emperor Maximilian I of Mexico, so that, at the age of 12 or 13, she traveled with her parents and sisters to Saint Petersburg. After the fall of Second Mexican Empire, the family traveled through Europe to Guatemala.

After the death of Benito Juárez, in 1872, Larráinzar and her family were able to return to Mexico. With her sister Josefina, who was possibly her twin, Larráinzar wrote novels and travel books, and on January 19, 1885, they founded the Congregation of Missionary Daughters of Calvary, which spread to Cuba, Spain, Italy, Rhodesia and Jerusalem.

== Death and legacy ==
Larráinzar died in Mexico City on 16 January 1925.

A street in the Colonia del Valle is named "Calle Ernestina Larráinzar". There is also a private primary and secondary school in Cuauhtémoc, Mexico City named in her honor.

== Publications ==
She shared authorship of her literary works with her sister, Josefina Larráinzar.

- Horas serias en la vida. Reflexiones escritas en 1879 (1879)
- Misterios del corazón (1881)
- Viaje a varias partes de Europa (1882)
- ¡Sonrisas y lágrimas! (1883)
