= Bettina Speckmann =

German computer scientist

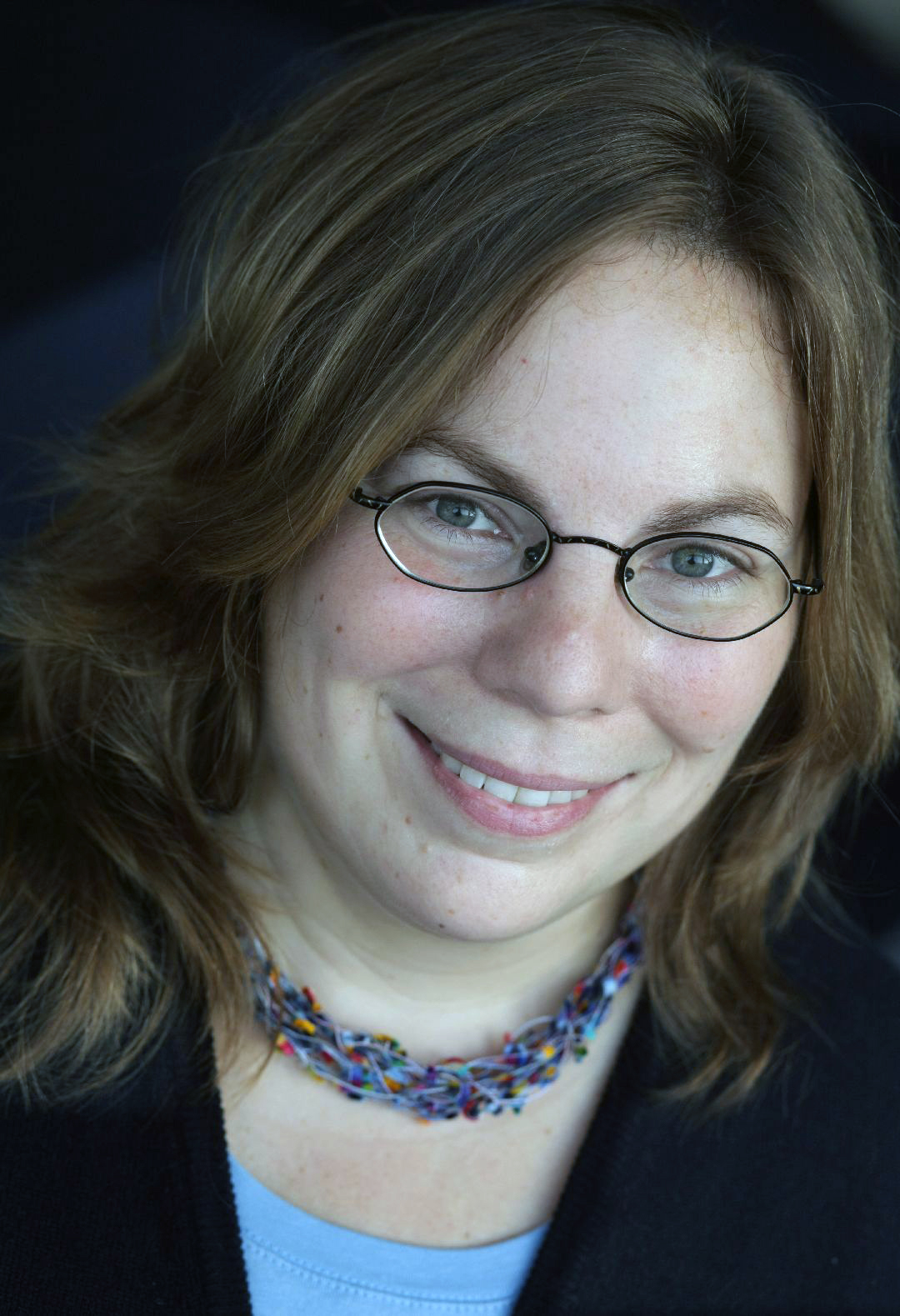
Bettina Speckmann, 2009

Bettina Speckmann (born 1972) is a German computer scientist who heads the Applied Geometric Algorithms group in the Department of Mathematics and Computer Science of Eindhoven University of Technology in Eindhoven, Netherlands, where she is a professor. The main topics of her research are computational geometry and information visualization, especially focusing on the geometry and visualization of objects in motion.

== Education and career ==
Speckmann earned a diploma from the University of Münster in 1996. She completed her Ph.D. in 2001 at the University of British Columbia under the joint supervision of Jack Snoeyink and David G. Kirkpatrick. Before joining the faculty at TU Eindhoven, she did postdoctoral research with Emo Welzl at ETH Zurich.

She is a member of the Computational Geometry Steering Committee, and has been program chair for the Symposium on Computational Geometry (2018), International Colloquium on Automata, Languages and Programming (2015), and International Symposium on Graph Drawing (2011).

== Recognition ==
In 2011, Speckmann was the first winner of the Netherlands Prize for ICT Research, given by the Koninklijke Hollandsche Maatschappij der Wetenschappen, for her work on geographic information systems. She was a member of the Global Young Academy from 2011 to 2016.

== Personal ==
Speckmann is the daughter of German neuroscientist and artist Erwin-Josef Speckmann.
