= Emmanuelle de Dampierre =

French aristocrat

- Duchess of Segovia and Anjou (more)
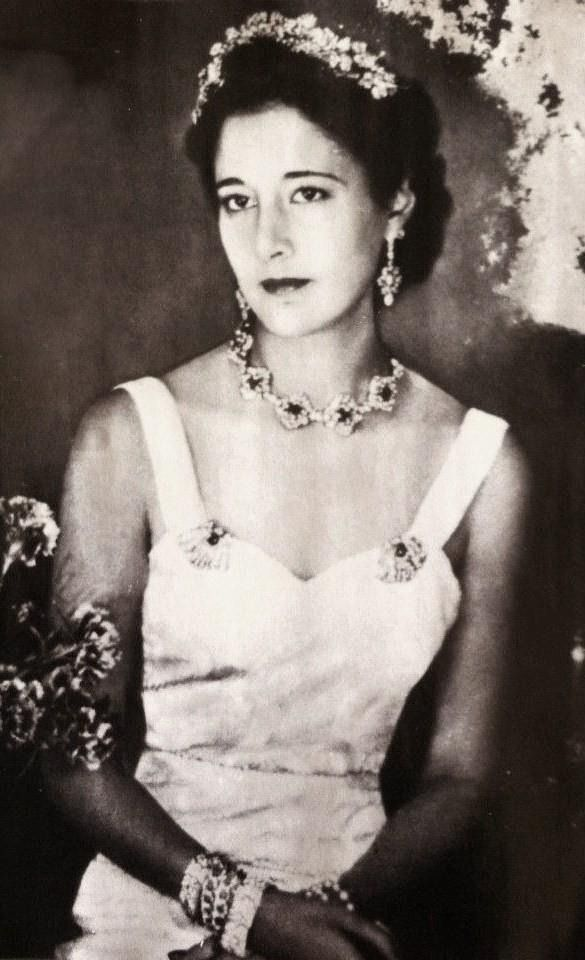
- Emmanuelle around 1942

Consort of the Legitimist pretender to the French throne
- Pretense: 28 February 1941 – 20 March 1975
- Born: 8 November 1913; Palazzo Ruspoli, Rome, Italy
- Died: 3 May 2012 (aged 98); Palazzo Massimo di Pirro, Rome, Italy
- Burial: 11 May 2012; Passy Cemetery
- Spouse: Infante Jaime, Duke of Segovia (m. 1935; div. 1947) Antonio Sozzani (m. 1949; div. 1967)
- Issue: Prince Alfonso, Duke of Anjou and Cádiz; Prince Gonzalo, Duke of Aquitaine
Names
- French: Victoire Jeanne Emmanuelle Joséphine Pierre Marie; Spanish: Victoria Juana Emanuela Josefina Petra María de Dampierre y Ruspoli
- House: House of Dampierre (by birth); House of Bourbon (by marriage)
- Father: Roger, 2nd Duke of San Lorenzo Nuovo, Vicomte de Dampierre
- Mother: Princess Vittoria Ruspoli
- Religion: Roman Catholic

Emmanuelle de Dampierre (Italian: Vittoria Emanuela; Spanish: Victoria Emanuela; 8 November 1913 – 3 May 2012) was a French-Italian aristocrat, a member of the Spanish royal family and the consort of the Legitimist pretender to the French throne from 28 February 1941 until 20 March 1975 as the wife of Infante Jaime, Duke of Anjou and Segovia, the second son of King Alfonso XIII and Queen Victoria Eugenie. She was the mother of Alfonso, Duke of Anjou and Cádiz and Gonzalo, Duke of Aquitaine.

Daughter of the 2nd Duke of San Lorenzo Nuovo, Emmanuelle was born a few months before the start of the First World War. She grew up between France and Italy, where her mother decided to live after her divorce. As a young woman, she joined the Italian Red Cross, in 1931. In Rome, she was received by King Victor Emmanuel III of Italy, at whose house she met the Duke of Segovia, Jaime. The two seems to become friends and Jaime’s father, the ex-king Alfonso XIII of Spain quickly presented his marriage proposal to Emmanuelle's mother, who accepted it. Jaime and Emmanuelle married a year after there first meeting. In the years that followed, she gave birth to two children, Alfonso in 1936 and Gonzalo in 1937.

During the Second World War, Italy was occupied by the Allies. The Spanish royal family left the country and they settled in Lausanne, Switzerland from 1943 until 1945. After the end of the war, the family moved back in Rome, and two years later, Emmanuelle divorced from Jaime in Romania. Their divorce was never legally recognised in Spain nor France. After the restoration of the Spanish monarchy in 1947, Emmanuelle’s children started their university in Madrid, in 1954. Some years later, in 1967, Emmanuelle divorced from her second husband, Antonio Sozzani, and her eldest son Alfonso married Franco’s granddaughter in 1972.

After the death of Jaime in 1975, the dowager Duchess of Anjou and Segovia came back in Spain for supporting her sons with their difficult marriages (Alfonso divorced Carmen in 1982 and Gonzalo married two times during the 1980s). In 1984, Emmanuelle’s eldest grandson, Francisco, died in a car crash. She was the sister-in-law of Infante Juan, Count of Barcelona and thus the paternal aunt-in-law of Juan Carlos I. At the time of her death at age 98, she was the longest-lived member of the Spanish royal family as well as the last daughter-in-law of King Alfonso XIII.

== Early life ==
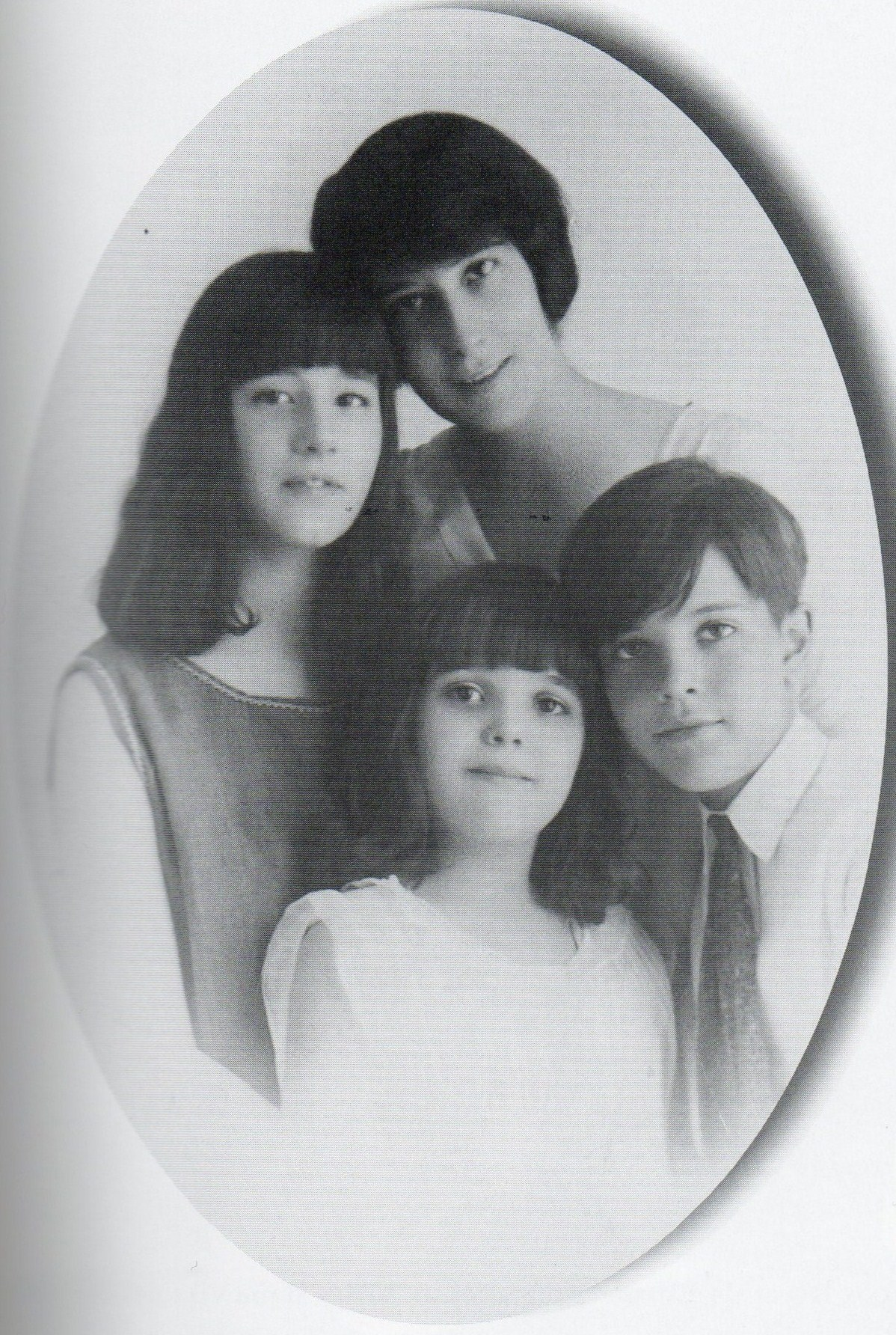
Emmanuelle de Dampierre with her mother, brother and sister in the 1920s.

Donna Victoire Jeanne Emmanuelle Joséphine Pierre Marie de Dampierre was born on 8 November 1913 at the Palazzo Ruspoli, her maternal family's palace on the Via del Corso in Rome. She was the eldest daughter of the French nobleman Roger de Dampierre, 2nd Duke of San Lorenzo Nuovo, Vicomte de Dampierre and his first wife, the Italian noblewoman and painter Princess Vittoria Ruspoli, a daughter of Emanuele Ruspoli, 1st Prince of Poggio Suasa. Both her maternal and paternal families were part of the Papal nobility. Through her uncle, Mario Ruspoli, 2nd Prince of Poggio Suasa, she was also connected to the Italian actress Esmeralda Ruspoli.

Emmanuelle was a descendant, in feminine line, of Prince Emanuel of Liechtenstein through his daughter, Princess Cristina of Liechtenstein. Although being descendant of the monarchs of Liechtenstein, Emmanuelle was also the descendant, in feminine line, of Gustav Vasa, the first King of Sweden from the House of Vasa.

She spent much of her childhood moving between Paris and Rome, until her parents divorced in 1930. At which time she returned with her mother, brother and sister to the Palazzo Ruspoli to live with her grandmother Josephine, Dowager Princess of Poggio Suasa.

In her memoirs, Emmanuelle describes her fatherless childhood. Although she lived almost her entire childhood without a father, she grew up in a happy atmosphere, later recalling:

Ours was a fatherless childhood. His absence wasn't the best situation imaginable, but it wasn't a tragedy for us, nor, of course, the source of any later trauma. The reality is that at some point, we simply stopped seeing him. As I mentioned before, I was very young when this happened, and my siblings even younger, since I was the oldest of the three. You could say we didn't miss him. Our life was comfortable and pleasant; we felt protected by my grandmother and my mother. I don't recall ever having a sad atmosphere at home.

Emmanuelle attended the Assumption School in Paris, and later in Rome. After her schooling ending, she travelled with her grandmother in London. Although she hated injuries, Emmanuelle became a Red Cross nurse on the recommendation of one of her friends. It was on this occasion that she acquired Italian nationality, because, being born French, she could not serve in the Italian Red Cross.

== Marriages ==
In 1934, Emmanuelle met Infante Jaime at a cocktail party. His father, King Alfonso XIII quickly presented his marriage proposal to Emmanuelle's mother, who accepted it, despite the fact than both of their children (Infante Jaime and Emmanuelle) didn’t like each others. It was at a dinner at Princess Radziwill's home that she met her future father-in-law. A few weeks later, their engagement was announced. They were married on 4 March 1935, during a great ceremony, at the Church of Sant'Ignazio in Rome. Although Jaime had to relinquish his rights to the Spanish throne, it was the second major royal wedding since that of Infanta Beatriz and Prince Alessandro Torlonia, 2 months earlier.

=== Life in the Spanish royal family ===
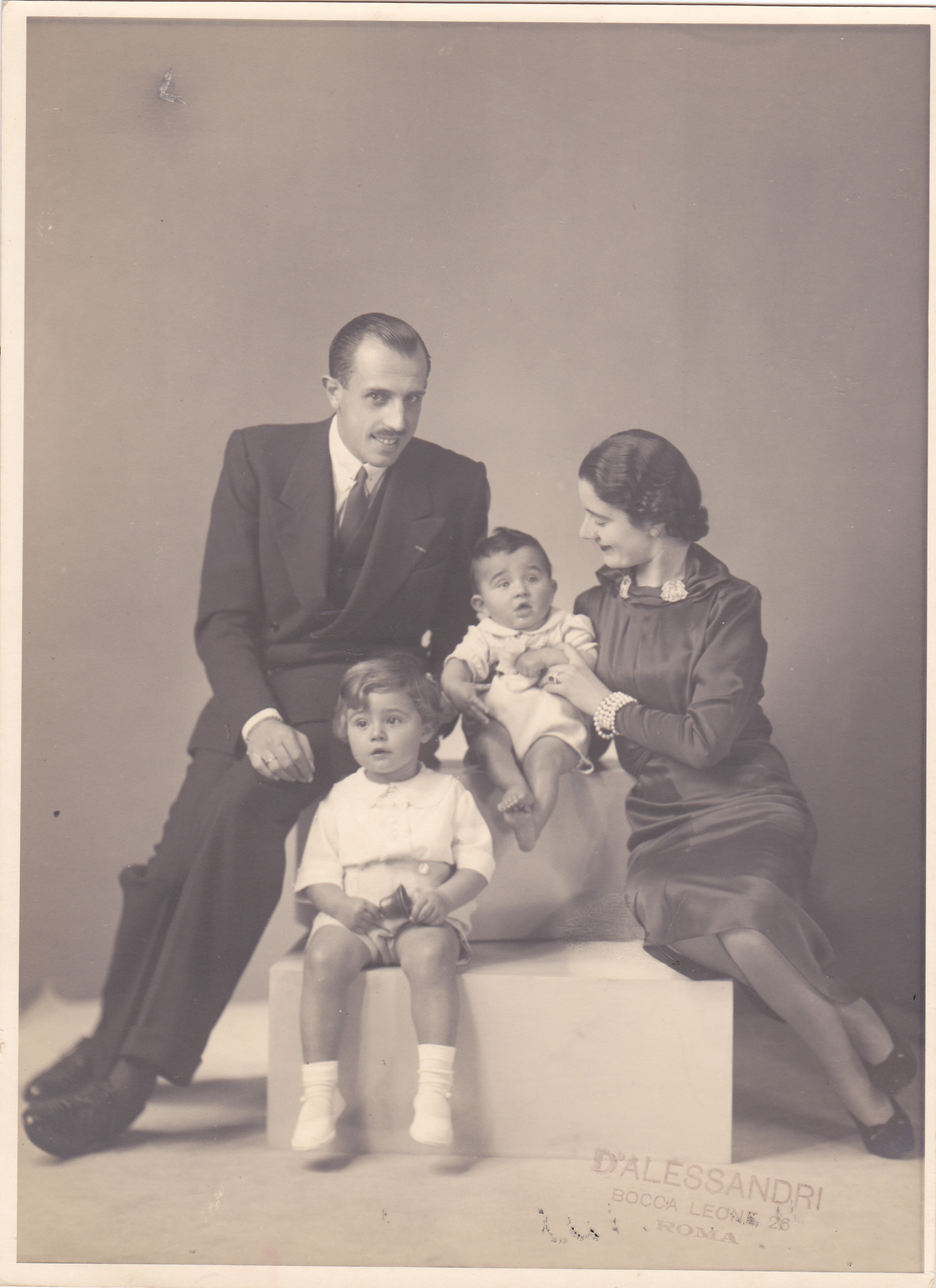
The Duke and Duchess of Anjou and Segovia in 1937 with their sons, Alfonso and Gonzalo.

Jaime and Emmanuelle established their first home at the Great Hotel of Rome, close to King Alfonso XIII. Emmanuelle continued to work for the Italian Red Cross while the Infante continues to cheat on his wife. The couple bore the title of Duke and Duchess of Segovia as the Dukedom was granted by King Alfonso.

According to Emmanuelle, she was raped during their honeymoon before giving birth to their eldest son, in 1936. They finally had two sons :

- Prince Alfonso, Duke of Anjou and Cádiz (20 April 1936 – 20 January 1989)
- Prince Gonzalo, Duke of Aquitaine (5 June 1937 – 5 March 2000)

King Alfonso died in 1941, which deeply affected Emmanuelle, who greatly admired her father in law.

During the Second World War, Jaime and his sons found refuge in Lausanne, Switzerland, with Queen Victoria Eugenie and other members of the Spanish royal family. The Duchess continued to work for the Italian Red Cross until 1942, the year in which she also took refuge in Lausanne with her family. During this period, the relations between Jaime and Emmanuelle continued to deteriorate.

=== Titular Queen of France ===
Styles of Emmanuelle, Duchess of Anjou
- Reference style: Her Royal Highness
- Spoken style: Your Royal Highness

At the end of the war, the family move to Rome and when her husband took up Duke of Anjou as a title of pretence on 28 March 1946, Emmanuelle became the Duchess of Anjou and was known simply as Madame. In 1947, Emanuelle and Infante Jaime divorced in Bucharest. She married a second time to Antonio Sozzani, a Milanese stockbroker, in Vienna. She and Sozzani divorced in 1967. While her first divorce was legally recognized in Italy, it was not recognized by the Catholic Church nor by the Spanish and French governments. From 1947 until her death in 2012, Emmanuelle was considered, both in Spain, in France and in many European courts, to be the true wife of the Infante.

== Later life and death ==
The 1980s were a very difficult period for Emmanuelle. After three years of separation, her eldest son, Alfonso, and his wife divorced in 1982. Two years later, in 1984, a serious car accident claimed the life of the Duke's eldest son, François de Bourbon (1972-1984), while Alfonso and his second son were seriously injured. Finally, in 1989, Alfonso died of a serious neck injury in a skiing accident in the United States. Many years later, in 2000, Emmanuelle's youngest son, Gonzalo, died from leukemia.

In 2003, Emanuelle published a memoir titled Memorias: Esposa y madre de los Borbones que pudieron reinar en España. Emmanuelle, called Madame, was considered by Legitimists as the French Queen Mother, and after the death of her eldest son Alfonso, as the Queen Dowager.

On 1 June 2007, Emmanuelle was present to the christening of her great granddaughter Princess Eugenie of Bourbon, the eldest son of Prince Louis Alphonse of Bourbon, and his wife María Margarita Vargas, Duke and Duchess of Anjou. The great ceremony took place in the Apostolic Nunciature to France and Eugenie was baptised by the Cardinal Fortunao Baldelli, Apostolic Nuncio to France from 1999 to 2009. Many guests were present, including Jean Foyer, former French Minister of Justice, the Duchess of Franco, the Duke of Bauffremont.

On 5 September 2010, the christening of Emmanuelle’s great grandsons, Prince Louis and Prince Alphonse of Bourbon took place in St. Peter's Basilica.

Emmanuelle died following a long-term illness at Palazzo Massimo di Pirro on 3 May 2012, aged 98 years. She was buried in the Dampierre family vault at the Passy Cemetery in Paris.

== Titles, styles, honours and arms ==
=== Titles and styles ===
==== Spain ====
- 8 November 1913 - 4 March 1935: Donna Emmanuelle de Dampierre
- 4 March 1935 - 3 May 2012: Her Excellency The Duchess of Segovia, Grandee of Spain
  - Her Excellency Emmanuelle de Dampierre, Grandee of Spain

==== France (Legitimists) ====
- 8 November 1913 - 3 March 1935: Mademoiselle Emmanuelle de Dampierre
- 4 March 1935 - 29 September 1936: Her Serene Highness The Duchess of Segovia
- 29 September 1936 - 6 September 1938: Her Royal Highness The Duchess of Segovia
- 6 September 1938 - 28 February 1941: Her Royal Highness The Dauphine of France
- 28 February 1941 - 20 March 1975: Her Royal Highness The Duchess of Anjou and Segovia
- 20 March 1975 - 3 May 2012: Her Royal Highness The Dowager Duchess of Anjou and Segovia

=== Honours ===
National

- Spain: Dame of the Order of Queen Maria Luisa, 1935
- Spain: Dame of the Decoration of the Royal Cavalry Armory of Seville, 1938
- Kingdom of Italy: Dame of the Italian Red Cross, 1931
- Kingdom of Italy: Dame of the Order of Saints Maurice and Lazarus

Foreign

- Sovereign Military Order of Malta: Bailiff Dame of the Sovereign Military Order of Malta

=== Arms ===
Coat of arms of Emmanuelle de Dampierre in Spain as Duchess of Segovia (1935-2012).

Coat of arms of Emmanuelle de Dampierre in France as Duchess of Anjou and Segovia with Order of Queen Maria Luisa (1941-2012).

Emmanuelle de Dampierre House of Dampierre Born: 8 November 1913 Died: 3 May 2012
Titles in pretence
Preceded by Victoria Eugenie of Battenberg	— TITULAR — Queen consort of France; Legitimist; 28 February 1941 – 20 March 1975	Succeeded by Carmen Martínez-Bordiú
