= Fergie Speakman =

Australian athletics coach (1900–1990)

Fergie Speakman (1900–1990) was an athletics coach who trained runners primarily on the Australian professional running circuit including five winners of the men's Stawell Gift - the most by any coach in the history of the race.

Speakman coached for over 50 years and has the longest span between Stawell winners with his first winning in 1932 and his last winner in 1985 when he was aged 85.

Speakman was an inaugural inductee and awarded legend status to the Stawell Gift Hall of Fame.

His Stawell Gift winners are:

- 1932 Roy Barker
- 1958 Malcolm Durant
- 1963 John Bell
- 1969 Barry McLeod
- 1985 Paul Young

Speakman also coached two Bendigo Thousand winners (Roy Beckwith 1951; Bob Tormey 1959) two Burnie Gift winners (1974 John Mowatt; 1979 Ian Hagger) and dozens of other winners on the Australian professional running circuit. His best Stawell carnival was in 1963 when he coached four winners - the winner of the Gift (John Bell), 440 yards with Des Cooke and the 660 yards/880 yards double with Malcolm Durant.

Speakman ran throughout the 1920s making a few Gift finals including the 1928 Warracknabeal Gift final, won by Doug Nicholls. Speakman won the first heat of the 1929 Stawell Gift beating pre-race favourite Bert Hyde, but was later run out in the semi-final.

In 1930, while watching a local football match, Speakman noticed the swiftness of young player named Roy Barker and offered to coach him. Barker became Speakman's first runner and trained him to win the 1932 Stawell Gift. Speakman trained Barker to the 1934 Stawell final and soon after, the Australian sprint championships.

In December 1949, Speakman was appointed by the Victorian Athletic League to coach visiting USA Olympian and professional sprint champion Barney Ewell. A month later, Ewell advised Speakman he couldn't handle the 'Australian method' of training and (Ewell) would coach himself.

In 1954, Speakman coached Jamaican Olympic silver medallist Herb McKenley during McKenley's stay in Australia.

Speakman was also a committee member, life member and chairman of selectors of the Essendon Football Club.

Since 1991, the trophy for the trainer of the winner of the men's Stawell Gift has been named the Ferg Speakman trophy. In 2025, Paul Young coached the winner of the men's Stawell Gift, forty years after Speakman had coached Young to win the 1985 Gift. Young became the first former Speakman trained athlete to be awarded the Ferg Speakman trophy.
