= Helen Rowland =

American journalist

Helen May Rowland
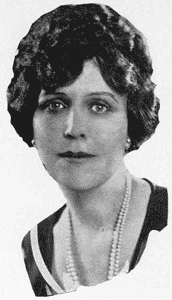
- Born: 1875
- Died: 1950 (aged 74–75)
- Occupation: Journalist
- Known for: newspaper columnist with New York World

Helen May Rowland (/ˈroʊlənd/; 1875–1950) was an American journalist and humorist. For many years she wrote a newspaper column in the New York World called "Reflections of a Bachelor Girl". Many of her pithy insights from these columns were published in book form, including Reflections of a Bachelor Girl (1909), The Rubáiyát of a Bachelor (1915), and A Guide to Men (1922).

She wrote humorous works about the 700 wives of Solomon, King of Israel, and about the White Woman's Burden in a parody of The White Man's Burden by Rudyard Kipling.

== Namesakes ==
She is often confused with the vaudevillian and singer Helen Rowland, who was later billed professionally as Helene Daniels. Born as Helen Hannah Rubin (September 28, 1908, Bronx, New York - October 15, 1992, New York), she started in 1927 as a vaudeville performer, opposite Ohio native "Muriel Malone" (born c. 1910/1911 - died April, 1980, Greenville, South Carolina) as a duo "Rubin and Malone", and sang on radio and recordings during the 1930s and early 1940s.

A silent film child actress also had the same name. She was born c.1918/1919 and was often credited as "Baby Helen Rowland" and briefly as "Baby Helen Lee" (during her second film appearance), distinguishing her from both the journalist and the singer.

== Books ==
- Reflections of a Bachelor (1903)
- A Book of Conversations: The Digressions of Polly (1905)
- The Widow (1908)
- Reflections of a Bachelor Girl (1909)
- The sayings of Mrs. Solomon: Being the confessions of the seven hundredth wife as revealed to Helen Rowland (1913)
- The Rubaiyat of a Bachelor (1915)
- A Guide To Men: Being Encore Reflections of a Bachelor Girl (1922) A Guide to Men, Project Gutenberg
- If, A Chant for Wives also The White Woman's Burden (1927)
- This Married Life (1927)
