= CHDI Foundation =

US non-profit foundation

CHDI Foundation, Inc
- Founded: 2002
- Merger of: Renewable Foundation, Inc., Sweetfeet Foundation, Inc.
- Type: 501(c)(3) Non-operating private foundation
- Tax ID no.: 73-1683871
- Purpose: Huntington's disease research and drug development
- Location(s): Los Angeles, New York City and Princeton
- Method: Contract-based support of third-party research organizations
- President, Treasurer: Kenneth J. Slutsky
- Revenue: $224,410,566 (2014)
- Expenses: $169,211,469 (2014)
- Website: chdifoundation.org
- Formerly called: High Q Foundation

The CHDI Foundation, Inc., is a United States–based non-profit biomedical foundation that aims to "rapidly discover and develop drugs that delay or slow the progression of Huntington's disease", a neurodegenerative genetic disorder that affects muscle coordination and leads to cognitive decline.

== History ==
CHDI's predecessor, the High Q Foundation, was established in 2002 by a group of private donors. It was officially incorporated in New Jersey on October 17, 2003. Originally, the High Q foundation aimed to identify targets for treatments, while CHDI – the 'Cure Huntington's Disease Initiative' – was a sister organization allied to the Hereditary Disease Foundation, that focused on developing drugs to hit those targets. 'CHDI', which is officially no longer an abbreviation for anything, now refers to the foundation as a whole.

In 2012 CHDI adopted a new logo, depicting a tree composed of interconnected circles. According to Simon Noble, CHDI's Director of Scientific Communication, the logo represents the groundedness of the Foundation, the hereditary nature of HD, the interconnectedness of biological pathways and the medicinal chemistry of drug development.

== Funding and direction of HD research ==
CHDI collaborates with a large number of academic and commercial research groups worldwide. It operates through a "virtual" biotechnology model, funding third party research organizations as opposed to having a physical research infrastructure of its own. Rather than supplying grants, CHDI enters into research contracts with its collaborators, and exerts a managerial role in addition to providing financial support.

In a 2007 Nature news feature, CHDI's then senior scientific advisor Allan Tobin stated, "Ninety-five per cent of science works on the principle that the best thing to do is to let good scientists follow their noses ... But this is a different attitude. We think we can direct the science."

CHDI's annual spend is unknown, but it is the largest single funder of Huntington's disease research: according to a Nature news feature, it spent $50 million in 2006. The identity of CHDI's donors is not public.
