= Epilepsy & Behavior =

- Discipline: Epilepsy
- Language: English
- Edited by: Steven Schachter

Publication details
- History: 2000-present
- Publisher: Elsevier
- Frequency: Bimonthly
- Impact factor: 2.061 (2013)

Standard abbreviations
- ISO 4: Epilepsy Behav.

Indexing
- CODEN: EBPEA4
- ISSN: 1525-5050 (print); 1525-5069 (web)
- LCCN: sn99008772
- OCLC no.: 41569329

Links
- Journal homepage; Journal page at publisher's website; Online archive

Epilepsy & Behavior is a bimonthly peer-reviewed medical journal covering behavioral aspects of epilepsy. The journal was established in 2000 and is published by Elsevier. The editor-in-chief is Steven Schachter (Harvard University). According to the Journal Citation Reports, the journal has a 2013 impact factor of 2.061.
