= Kantonsspital St. Gallen =

St Gallon Cantonal Hospital
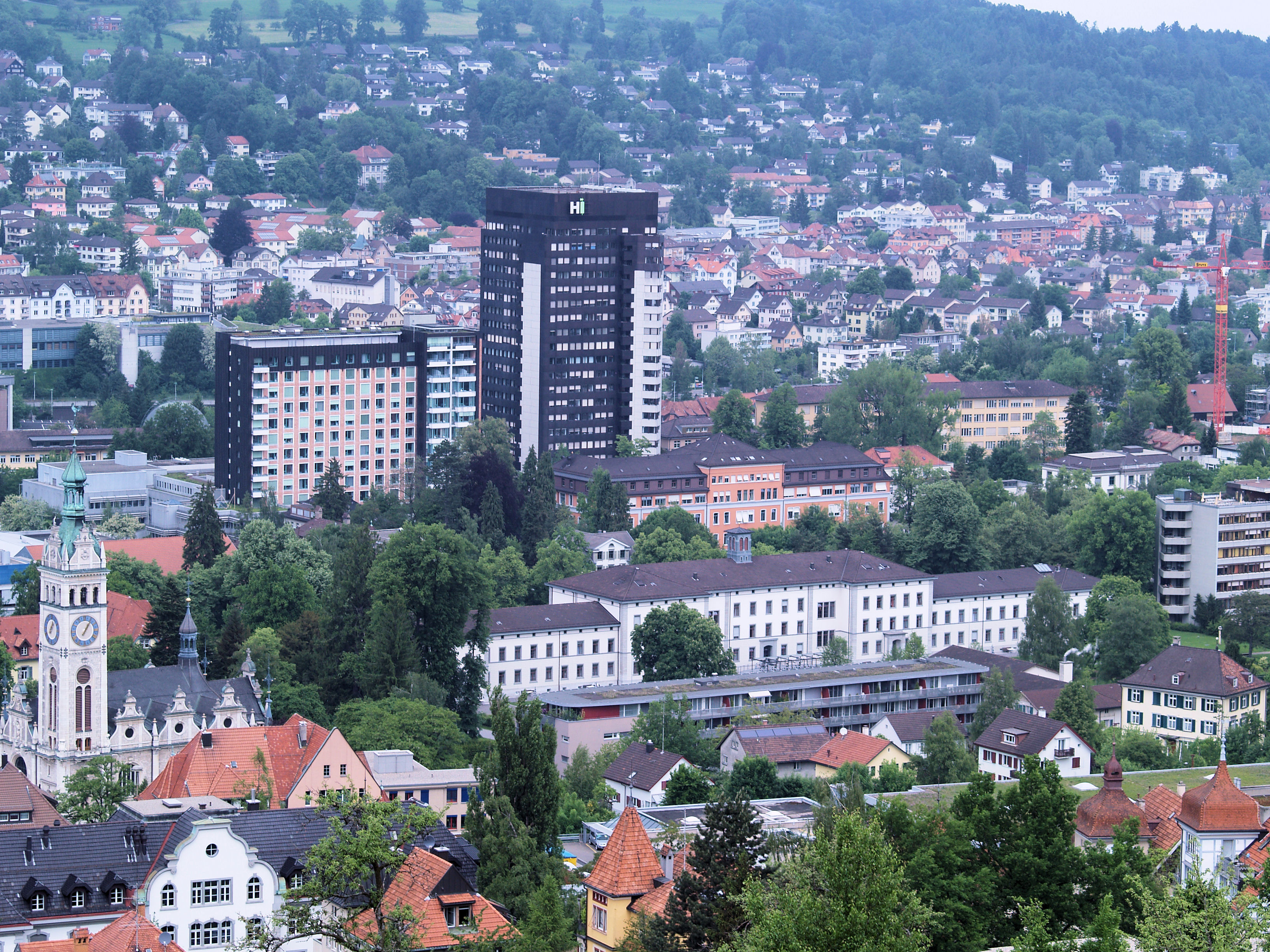
- View of St. Gallen with the hospital in the center.

Geography
- Location: Rorschacher Strasse 95, St. Gallen, Canton of St. Gallen, Switzerland
- Coordinates: 47.430080°N 9.387828°E

Organisation
- Care system: Public
- Type: District General

Services
- Emergency department: Yes

Helipads
- Helipad: Yes

History
- Founded: 1873

Links
- Website: http://www.kssg.ch

The Kantonsspital St. Gallen (German for: Canton of St. Gallen-Hospital) is the main hospital in the Canton of St. Gallen and the sixth largest in Switzerland. It lies in the center of St. Gallen, the capital of the canton.
