= Erwin-Josef Speckmann =

German neuroscientist and artist

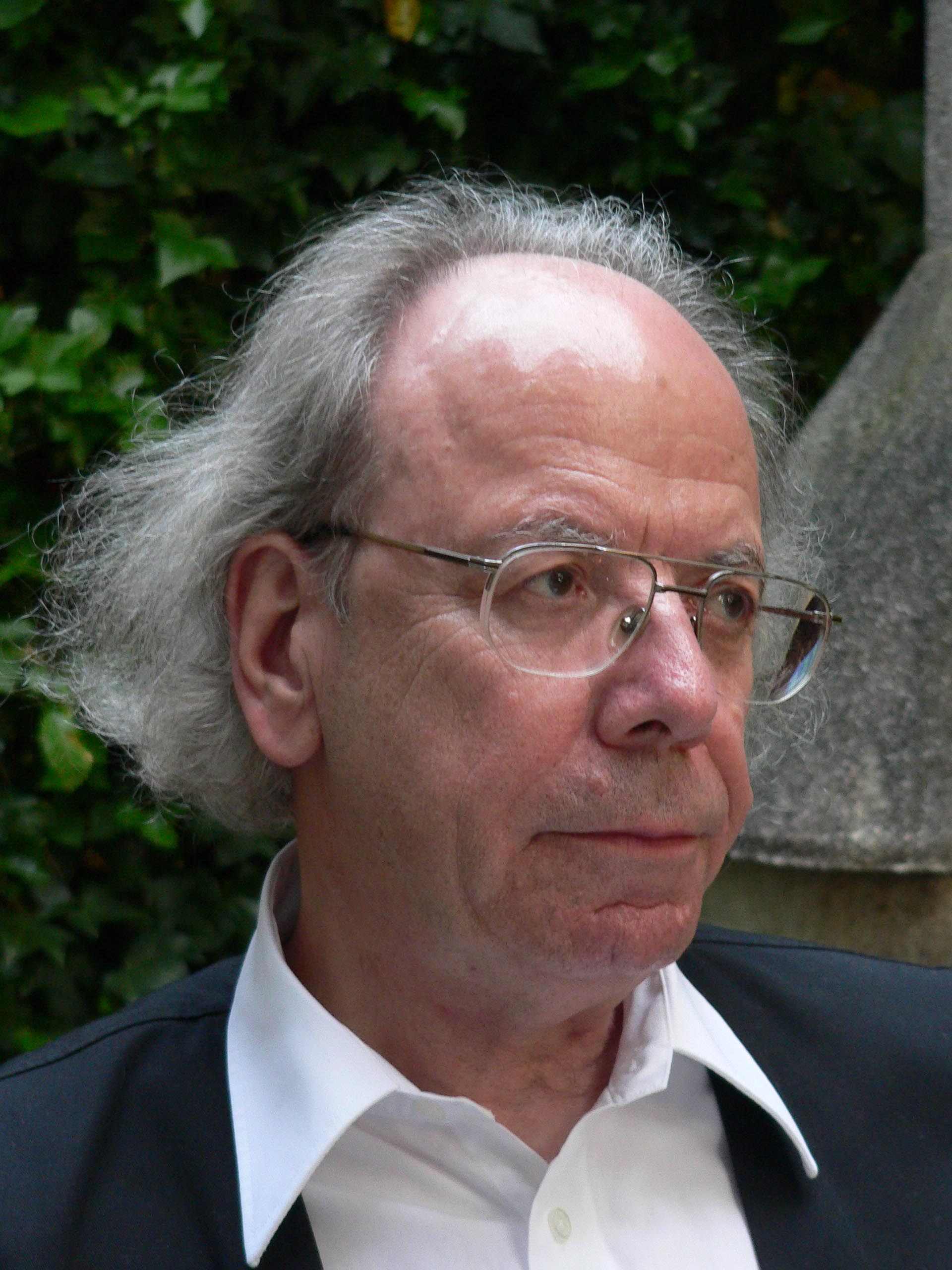
- Born: April 25, 1939 (age 87)
- Occupations: Neuroscientist; Artist
- Children: Bettina Speckmann

Erwin-Josef Speckmann (born April 25, 1939, in Münster, Germany) is a German neuroscientist and artist. Until his retirement in 2005, he was the head of the Institute of Physiology at the University of Münster, and a professor in the Art Academy Münster. He is also a former dean of the medical faculty at the University of Münster, two-time president of the German EEG Society, and past president of the German Physiological Society. As well as his work on neuroscience, Speckmann has exhibited his art in several exhibition spaces including the botanical gardens of Münster and published three books about his art. He has also worked to promote music therapy.

== Awards and honors ==
- 1974: Special award of Stiftung Michael (Stiftung zur Bekämpfung von Anfallskrankheiten)
- 1981: Hans Berger Prize
- 1984: Alfred Hauptmann Prize
- 2006: Honorary member of Deutsche Gesellschaft für Klinische Neurophysiologie und funktionelle Bildgebung
- 2007: Otfrid Foerster Medal
- 2010: Honorary member of Deutsche Gesellschaft für Epileptologie
- 2011: Officer's Cross of Order of Merit of the Federal Republic of Germany
- 2019: Honorary member of University of Fine Arts Münster

== Books (selection) ==
- Erich Schütz, Heinz Caspers, Erwin-Josef Speckmann: Physiologie. 15th edition, Urban & Schwarzenberg, München/Wien/Baltimore 1978; 16th edition 1982.
- Einführung in die Neurophysiologie. Wissenschaftliche Buchgesellschaft, Darmstadt 1981; 3rd edition 1991.
- Experimentelle Epilepsieforschung. Wissenschaftliche Buchgesellschaft, Darmstadt 1986.
- Erwin-Josef Speckmann, Helga Schulze: Der Versorgungsteil des Organismus. Wissenschaftliche Buchgesellschaft, Darmstadt 1990.
- Erwin-Josef Speckmann, Werner Wittkowski: Bau und Funktionen des menschlichen Körpers. 18th edition, Urban & Schwarzenberg, München 1994; 20th edition: Elsevier/Urban & Fischer, München 2004. Handbuch Anatomie - Bau und Funktionen des menschlichen Körpers. 21. Auflage: Elsevier / Urban & Fischer, München 2020
- Erwin-Josef Speckmann, Jürgen Hescheler, Rüdiger Köhling (Hrsg.): Physiologie. 8th edition, Elsevier/Urban & Fischer, München 2024.
- Das Gehirn meiner Kunst. Kreativität und das selbstbewusste Gehirn. Daedalus, Münster 2008; 3rd edition, Daedalus, Münster 2018.
- Grenzflächen. Prinzip der Lebendigkeit im Lebenden. Daedalus, Münster 2013.
- Das Kunst-Ding. Braucht Kunst einen dinglichen Ausdruck? Ein Vorwort aus Hirnforschung und künstlerischer Praxis. Daedalus, Münster 2017
- Grenzflächen II, Daedalus, Münster 2021, ISBN 978-3-89126-288-7
- Der Geist aus der Kunst. Das unverstandene Wissen und die gefühlte Energie. Essays: I. Kunst – ein Spiel; II. Kunst – eine Vorschule des Betens; III. Kunst – Muster als Ordnungsgefüge; IV. Kunst – Immersion. Daedalus Verlag, Münster 2023, ISBN 978-3-89126-295-5
