= Cristóbal Martínez-Bordiú, 10th Marquis of Villaverde =

Cristóbal, Marqués de Villaverde
- Duke Consort of Franco
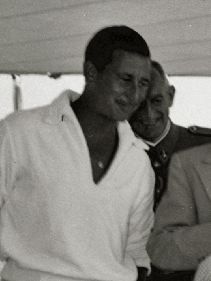

Marquess of Villaverde
- Tenure: 12 December 1980 – 4 February 1998
- Predecessor: María de la Esperanza Bordiú y Bascarán
- Successor: Francisco Martínez-Bordiú y Franco
- Born: 1 August 1922; Jaén, Mancha Real, Spain
- Died: 4 February 1998 (aged 75); Madrid, Spain
- Burial: Almudena Cathedral
- Spouse: Carmen Franco y Polo (m. 1950)
- Issue: María del Carmen, Duchess of Anjou and Cádiz; María de la O Ardid y Martínez-Bordiú; Francisco Martínez-Bordiú y Franco, 11th Marquess of Villaverde; María del Mar Martínez-Bordiú y Franco; José Cristóbal Martínez-Bordiú y Franco; María de Aránzazu Quiroga y Martínez-Bordiú; Jaime Martínez-Bordiú y Franco
- Father: José María Martínez y Ortega
- Mother: María de la Esperanza Bordiú y Bascarán, 7th Countess of Argillo

Don Cristóbal Martínez-Bordiú y Ortega, 10th Marquess of Villaverde (1 August 1922 – 4 February 1998) was a Spanish aristocrat, the son-in-law of dictator Francisco Franco, and a heart surgeon. In Spanish, his peerage is written El X Marqués de Villaverde (English: The 10th Marquess of Villaverde).

== Family ==
Born as Cristóbal Martínez y Bordiú, he was one of four children of José María Martínez y Ortega (Jaén, Mancha Real, 24 October 1890 – Mancha Real, 10 November 1970) and wife (m. Sabiñán, 2 February 1918) María de la O Esperanza Bordiú y Bascarán (Madrid, 19 December 1896 – Mancha Real, 12 December 1980), 7th Countess of Argillo. Cristóbal was given the title of 10th Marquess of Villaverde by his mother.

When he was 23, he graduated from medical school.

== Marriage and children ==
He was married on 10 April 1950 in the Palacio Real de El Pardo with María del Carmen Franco y Polo, the future Duchess of Franco, the only daughter of Generalísimo Francisco Franco, the Spanish Caudillo. There were more than 800 attending the wedding. It was performed by the Bishop Leopoldo Eijo y Garay of the Diocese of Madrid (now Archdiocese of Madrid). This wedding brought him high social status in the Spain of General Franco. He was jokingly nicknamed the Yernísimo, in a clear reference to the title of Generalísimo of his father-in-law (yerno in Spanish means son-in-law, although in proper Spanish grammar the suffix -ísimo can only be added to certain adjectives to indicate "very", but it can never be used with nouns). In 13 years, he and his wife had seven children:

- María del Carmen Martínez-Bordiú y Franco (b. El Pardo, 26 February 1951), who married firstly to Prince Alphonse, Duke of Anjou and Cádiz, son of the Infante Jaime, Duke of Segovia and grandson of King Alfonso XIII; divorced in 1982 and had issue; married secondly in 1984 to Jean-Marie Rossi; divorced in 1995 and had issue; married thirdly in 2006 to José Campos García, without issue.
  - Prince Francisco de Asís, Duke of Bourbon (1972–1984)
  - Prince Louis, Duke of Anjou (1974–), married in 2004 to María Margarita Vargas Santaella (1983–) and has issue:
    - Princess Eugenia of Bourbon (2007–)
    - Prince Louis, Duke of Burgundy (2010–)
    - Prince Alphonse, Duke of Berry (2010–)
    - Prince Henri, Duke of Touraine (2019–)
  - María Cynthia Rossi (1985–)
- María la O (Mariola) Martínez-Bordiú y Franco (b. El Pardo, 19 November 1952), married in El Pardo on 14 March 1974 Rafael Ardid y Villoslada (b. 1 February 1947), and had issue:
  - Francisco de Borja Ardid y Martínez-Bordiú (b. Madrid, 20 December 1975), married in Ciudad Real on 23 July 2005 María Ruiz y Vega
  - Jaime Rafael Ardid y Martínez-Bordiú (b. Madrid, 28 September 1976)
  - Francisco Javier Ardid y Martínez-Bordiú (b. Madrid, 7 April 1987)
- Francisco Franco y Martínez-Bordiú, 11th Marquess of Villaverde, 2nd Lord of Meriás (b. 9 December 1954)
- María del Mar (Merry) Martínez-Bordiú y Franco (b. 6 July 1956), married firstly at the Pazo de Meirás on 3 August 1977 and divorced in 1982 Joaquín José Giménez-Arnau y Puente (b. 14 September 1943), and had issue, and married secondly in New York City, New York, on 4 August 1986 and divorced in 1991 Gregor Tamler, without issue:
  - Leticia Giménez-Arnau y Martínez-Bordiú (b. 25 January 1979), married on 8 August 2008 Marcos Sagrera y Palomo
- José Cristóbal (Cristóbal) Martínez-Bordiú y Franco (b. El Pardo, 10 February 1958), married civilly in New York City, New York, on 23 November 1984 and religiously in Madrid on 27 October 1990 Model Josefina Victoria Toledo y López (b. San José de Tirajana, Canary Islands, 1963), and had issue:
  - Daniel Martínez-Bordiú y Toledo (b. Madrid, 11 June 1990)
  - Diego Martínez-Bordiú y Toledo (b. Madrid, 4 May 1998)
- María de Aránzazu (Arantxa) Martínez-Bordiú y Franco (b. 16 September 1962), married at the Pazo de Meirás on 27 July 1996 Claudio Quiroga y Ferro, without issue.
- Jaime Felipe (Jaime) Martínez-Bordiú y Franco (b. 8 July 1964), married in Madrid on 24 November 1995 Nuria March y Almela (b. July 1966), later divorced and had issue. Married secondly on 7 April 2021 in a civil ceremony in Madrid to Marta Fernández, without issue:
  - Jaime Martínez-Bordiú y March (b. Madrid, 13 November 1999)

== First Spanish heart transplant ==
Since he was a heart surgeon and great friend and admirer of Dr. Christiaan Barnard, he became the first Spaniard to perform a heart transplant in September 1968. The patient only survived 24 hours. A popular joke was that Villaverde killed more in La Paz (the hospital where he worked, and translating to The Peace) than his father-in-law in the war.

On a visit to Spain Dr. Barnard joked, "I am a surgeon who wants to be a playboy and he is a playboy that wishes to be a surgeon."

== Franco's deathbed ==
Dr Martínez-Bordiú headed the medical team that tended the dictator in his final illness (November 1975). In 1984, Jaime Peñafiel's gossip magazine La Revista published pictures of Franco in his hospital bed surrounded by tubes and medical equipment. Martínez-Bordiú acknowledged taking the pictures but claimed that the photographs were stolen from him.

== Death ==
The Marqués died in Madrid on 4 February 1998 and was succeeded as marquess by his eldest son, Francisco, 11th Marqués de Villaverde. The 10th Marquess of Villaverde is buried in the crypt of Almudena Cathedral.

== Orders and decorations ==
- Knight of the Spanish Order of the Golden Fleece
- Knight Collar of the Order of Charles III
- Knight of the Order of Calatrava
- Knight Grand Cross of the Order of Isabella the Catholic
- Knight of the Order of the Holy Sepulchre
