= Alfonso, Duke of Anjou and Cádiz =

Alfonso
- Duke of Anjou and Duke of Cádiz
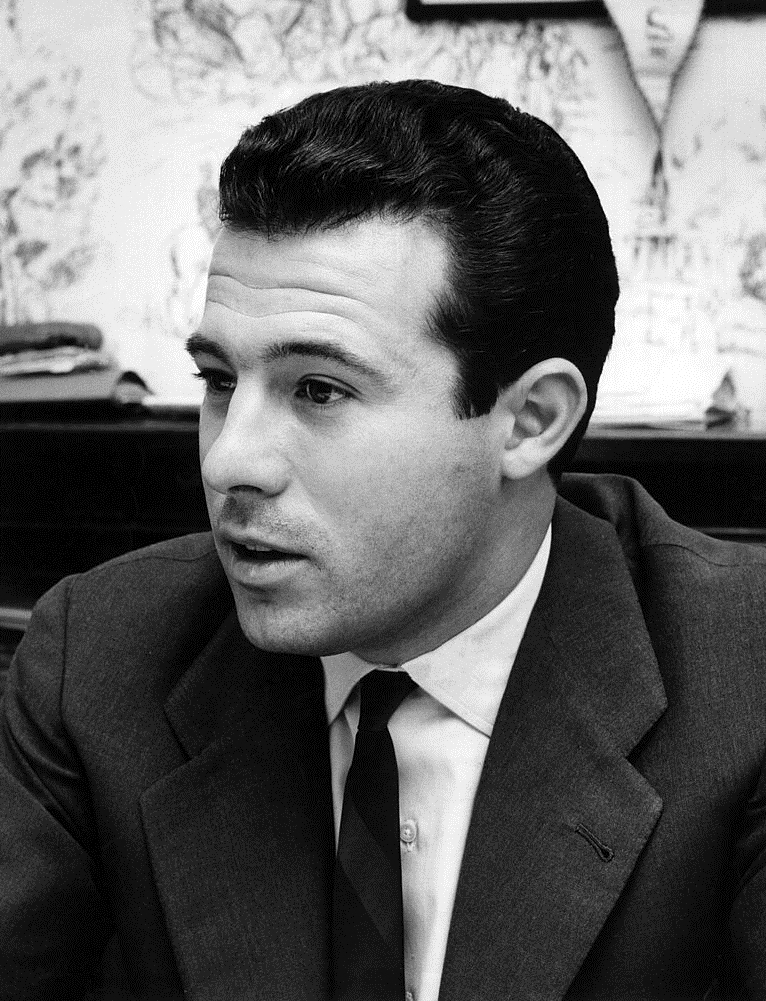
- Alfonso in 1963

Duke of Cádiz
- Tenure: 22 November 1972 – 30 January 1989
- Successor: Reverted to the Crown

Legitimist pretender to the French throne
- Pretence: 20 March 1975 – 30 January 1989
- Predecessor: Infante Jaime, Duke of Segovia
- Successor: Louis Alphonse de Bourbon
- Born: 20 April 1936; Clinica di Sant'Anna, Rome, Kingdom of Italy
- Died: 30 January 1989 (aged 52); Avon, Colorado, U.S.
- Burial: Las Descalzas Reales
- Spouse: María del Carmen Martínez-Bordiú y Franco (m. 1972; div. 1982)
- Issue: Prince François, Duke of Bourbon; Prince Louis Alfonso, Duke of Anjou
Names
- Spanish: Don Alfonso Jaime Marcelino Manuel Víctor María de Borbón-Segovia y Dampierre; French: Alphonse Jacques Marcellin Emmanuel Victor Marie de Bourbon
- House: Bourbon
- Father: Infante Jaime, Duke of Anjou and Segovia
- Mother: Emmanuelle de Dampierre, Duchess of Anjou and Segovia
- Religion: Roman Catholicism

Alfonso, Duke of Anjou, Duke of Cádiz, Grandee of Spain (Spanish: Don Alfonso Jaime Marcelino Manuel Víctor María de Borbón y Dampierre; French: Alphonse Jacques Marcellin Emmanuel Victor Marie de Bourbon; 20 April 1936 – 30 January 1989) was a grandson of King Alfonso XIII of Spain, a potential heir to the throne in the event of the restoration of the Spanish monarchy, and the Legitimist claimant to the throne of France.

== Upbringing ==
Alfonso was born at Sant'Anna Clinic in Rome, the elder son of Infante Jaime, Duke of Segovia, King Alfonso's second of four sons. His mother was Donna Emanuela de Dampierre, daughter of Roger, Duke of San Lorenzo and Donna Vittoria Ruspoli dei principi di Poggio Suasa. The Segovias lived in Rome where Jaime's father had maintained a royal court-in-exile since the royal family fled Spain following the 1931 election of republicans and socialists in Spain's major cities. Alfonso was baptised by Eugenio Cardinal Pacelli (later Pope Pius XII) at the Palazzo Ruspoli on the Via del Corso in Rome, home of his maternal grandmother, Donna Vittoria Ruspoli dei principi di Poggio Suasa.

In 1941, Alfonso and his parents followed his English-born grandmother, Queen Victoria Eugenie to Lausanne in Switzerland. They lived first at the Hotel Royal, before Alfonso and his younger brother Gonzalo were sent to the Collège Saint-Jean (later Villa St. Jean International School) in Fribourg. On 8 December 1946 Alfonso made his first communion with his brother, Gonzalo; on the same day he was confirmed by Pedro Cardinal Segura y Sáenz, Archbishop of Seville.

== Spanish succession rights ==
The king's eldest son, Alfonso, Prince of Asturias, had inherited hemophilia from his maternal great-grandmother Queen Victoria, yet had been considered Spain's heir apparent until the republic was established in 1931. In 1933 he renounced any claim to inherit the Spanish throne (in the event of a restoration) to marry a Cuban commoner, Edelmira Sampedro-Ocejo, and later died of internal bleeding following a minor auto accident by September 1938. Next in the line of succession, Infante Don Jaime, deaf and largely mute, was that same day persuaded to renounce his claim (and that of future descendants) alongside his elder brother, thereby assuming the Duke of Segovia title and clearing the way for King Alfonso's third son, Don Juan, Count of Barcelona to take up the monarchist cause on behalf of the banished dynasty. There being no need for Segovia to contract a dynastic alliance, Emanuela de Dampierre's noble rather than royal background was looked upon approvingly by the former king and former queen when the couple wed in Rome in 1935, and neither style nor title is attributed to Alfonso de Borbón-Segovia y Dampierre in the 1944 edition of the Almanach de Gotha.

During the Spanish Civil War which began in July 1936 Franco emerged as the Caudillo of the Falangist movement, overturning the republic and promising restoration, yet consolidating his grip on power in Madrid. Following Alfonso XIII's death in Rome in February 1941, Franco wrote Don Juan, acknowledging him as rightful heir to the throne (though without inviting him to occupy it), implicitly confirming that he considered Segovia and his sons excluded from the royal succession. Although in 1947, following the overturn of monarchies in Eastern Europe and Italy, Franco promulgated, and voters approved, a succession law which defined Spain as a kingdom, it also empowered Franco to decide whom to enthrone and when. Don Juan responded by issuing the Estoril Manifesto which affirmed the traditional order of succession, and followed up with comments embracing a democratic monarchy. The new law allowed Franco or his successor to choose any man "of royal lineage" as king, and Alfonso was mentioned that year as a possible alternative to Don Juan and his son, Juan Carlos, should Franco consider the former too liberal to reign over a Falangist Spain.

In December 1949, Segovia retracted his renunciation as coerced and claimed that he was the rightful claimant to Spain's crown. Relations between Don Juan and Franco continued to deteriorate and in 1952 the latter prevailed upon Segovia to send his elder son to Spain to be educated under his guidance. Reluctantly, Alfonso moved from Switzerland to Spain, initially to study law at Deusto University and, in 1955 to attend the elite Centro de Estudios Universitarios (CEU). By 1956 Franco was diverting sponsors of some civic events from Juan Carlos, who was also being educated in Spain under the Caudillo's supervision, to Alfonso. By 1964, Franco considered Juan Carlos his preferred candidate for the throne over his father, but also considered that if the latter deviated from obedience to Franco or loyalty to his Movimiento Nacional, Alfonso was a suitable alternative. Alfonso's strongest supporter in Franco's government was José Solís Ruiz, minister and secretary-general of the Movimiento. Anticipating that Franco would soon offer to declare him Spain's next king rather than Don Juan, in June 1969, Juan Carlos warned his father that if he declined Franco's offer, Alfonso would be invited to accept the crown, nevertheless Don Juan refused to consent to being bypassed. Nonetheless on 12 July 1969 Franco offered to designate Juan Carlos king whenever he stepped down from power, and Juan Carlos accepted.

Asked by Juan Carlos to be chief witness at the ceremony declaring him successor and Prince of Spain, Alfonso immediately agreed to do so and sent some of his supporters to visit his father in Paris to persuade him to express no opposition publicly. In return for his full support, Franco later appointed Alfonso Spain's ambassador to Sweden. But in June 1972, after he had taken up that post, Alfonso advised Franco's foreign minister Laureano López Rodó that he deemed his support conditional upon his cousin's continued loyalty to Francoist Spain. He further hinted that Spain's law of succession should be amended to facilitate Alfonso's replacing or succeeding Juan Carlos as Franco's heir or on the throne, if circumstances called for such a change.

On 8 March 1972, in the Palace of El Pardo in Madrid, Alfonso married Doña María del Carmen Martínez-Bordiú y Franco, daughter of Don Cristóbal Martínez-Bordiú, 10th Marquis de Villaverde, and of his wife, Doña Carmen Franco y Polo (Franco's only daughter. Doña Carmen was granted a title in 1975 becoming the 1st Duchess de Franco after Franco's death). The witnesses of the marriage were Franco and Alfonso's mother. Alfonso and Carmen separated in 1979, received a civil divorce in 1982 and an ecclesiastical annulment in 1986.

On 22 November 1972, General Franco awarded Alfonso the Spanish title Duque de Cádiz with the dignity Grandee of Spain, and he received the style of Royal Highness. The Cádiz title had been held by Alfonso's great-great-grandfather, the Infante Francisco de Asís.

== French succession rights ==
Since Alfonso's mother was not born a princess of royal descent, his grandfather Alfonso XIII did not consider young Alfonso in line to the Spanish throne in accordance with the Pragmatic Sanction of 1830. Alfonso's father Jaime, however, came to assert that his sons were French dynasts entitled to the style of Royal Highness.

In Spain up until 1972, Alfonso was generally addressed as Don Alfonso de Borbón y Dampierre. Elsewhere he was often addressed as a prince.

On 25 November 1950, Alfonso received the title Duc de Bourbon (Duke of Bourbon) from his father. In 1963, Alfonso engaged the French historian and ardent royalist Hervé Pinoteau as his private secretary. Pinoteau remained with him until the duke's death.

On 20 March 1975, Alfonso's father Jaime died. On 3 August 1975, he took the courtesy title Duc d'Anjou (Duke of Anjou).

On 21 January 1985 (the 192nd anniversary of the death of King Louis XVI) Alfonso was present for the requiem mass at the Chapelle expiatoire in Paris.

== Marriage and children ==
proposed arms as Duke of Cádiz (Spain), never adopted

Coat of arms as pretender to the French throne (1975–1989)

- Don Francisco de Asís Alfonso Jaime Cristóbal Víctor José Gonzalo Cecilio de Borbón y Martínez-Bordiú, Duke of Bourbon (Madrid, 22 November 1972 – Pamplona, 7 February 1984).
- Don Luis Alfonso Gonzalo Víctor Manuel Marco de Borbón y Martínez-Bordiú, Duke of Anjou (born Madrid, 25 April 1974).

== Lawsuit of the Count of Clermont against the Duke of Anjou ==
In 1987, his paternal 10th cousin Prince Henri of Orléans, Count of Clermont, eldest son of Henri, Count of Paris, the then Orléanist claimant to the defunct throne of France, initiated a court action against Alfonso for his use of the title Duke of Anjou and the coat-of-arms France Moderne (three fleur-de-lis or); Henri asked the court to fine Alfonso 50,000 French francs for each future violation. In 1988, Prince Ferdinand, Duke of Castro and Prince Sixtus Henry of Bourbon-Parma joined Henri's lawsuit in reference to the use of the title Duke of Anjou, but not in respect to the coat-of-arms. On 21 December 1988, the Tribunal de grande instance of Paris ruled that the lawsuit was inadmissible because the title's legal existence could not be proven; that neither the plaintiff (Henri) nor the intervenors (Fernando and Sixtus) had established their claims to the title; and that Henri was not injured from the use of the plain arms of France by the Spanish branch of the Bourbon family.

In 1989, Prince Henri d'Orléans and Prince Sixtus Henry of Bourbon-Parma appealed the judgment in the lawsuit about the use of a title and arms by Alfonso; the original judgment in favour of Alfonso was upheld.

== Career ==
From 1977 to 1984, Alfonso was President of the Spanish Skiing Federation, and from 1984 to 1987 President of the Spanish Olympic Committee.

== Death ==
Alfonso died in a skiing accident in Beaver Creek Resort, Eagle County, Colorado, on 30 January 1989, from broken neck by a cable which he collided with as it was being raised to support a banner at the finish line of a course at the FIS Alpine World Ski Championships.

== Honours ==
- Sovereign Military Order of Malta: Bailiff Knight Grand Cross of Honour and Devotion
- Spain: Knight Grand Cross of the Order of Isabella the Catholic
- Sweden: Commander Grand Cross of the Royal Order of the Polar Star

=== Dynastic ===
- (Kingdom of France) House of Bourbon-France: Sovereign and Knight of the Royal Order of Saint Michael
- (Kingdom of France) House of Bourbon-France: Sovereign and Knight of the Royal Order of the Holy Spirit
- (Kingdom of France) House of Bourbon-France: Sovereign and Knight of the Royal and Military Order of Saint Louis
- (Kingdom of Italy) House of Savoy: Knight Grand Cordon of the Royal Order of Saints Maurice and Lazarus
- (Kingdom of the Two Sicilies) House of Bourbon-Two Sicilies: Knight Grand Cross of Justice of the Sacred Military Constantinian Order of Saint George

== Bibliography ==
- Dem, Marc. Le duc d'Anjou m'a dit: la vie de l'aîné des Bourbons. Paris: Perrin, 1989. ISBN 2-262-00725-X.
- Silve de Ventavon, Jean. La légitimité des lys et le duc d'Anjou. Paris: Editions F. Lanore, 1989. ISBN 2-85157-060-9.
- Zavala, José M. Dos infantes y un destino. Barcelona: Plaza & Janés, 1998. ISBN 84-01-55006-8.

Alfonso, Duke of Anjou and Cádiz House of Bourbon Cadet branch of the Capetian dynasty Died: 30 January 1989
Spanish nobility
| Preceded by New creation | Duke of Cádiz; 3rd creation 22 November 1972 — 30 January 1989 | Extinct |
French nobility
| Preceded by Infante Jaime | Duke of Anjou; 3 August 1975 – 30 January 1989 | Succeeded by Louis Alphonse |
| New title | Duke of Bourbon; 25 November 1950 – 1975 | Succeeded by François de Bourbon |
Titles in pretence
| Preceded by Infante Jaime, Duke of Segovia | — TITULAR — King of France and Navarre; 20 March 1975 – 30 January 1989; Reason for succession failure: Bourbon monarchy abolished in 1830 | Succeeded by Louis Alphonse de Bourbon |
| Preceded by Infante Jaime, Duke of Segovia | — TITULAR — Dauphin of France; 28 February 1941 - 20 March 1975 | Succeeded by François de Bourbon |
