= Carmen Martínez-Bordiú =

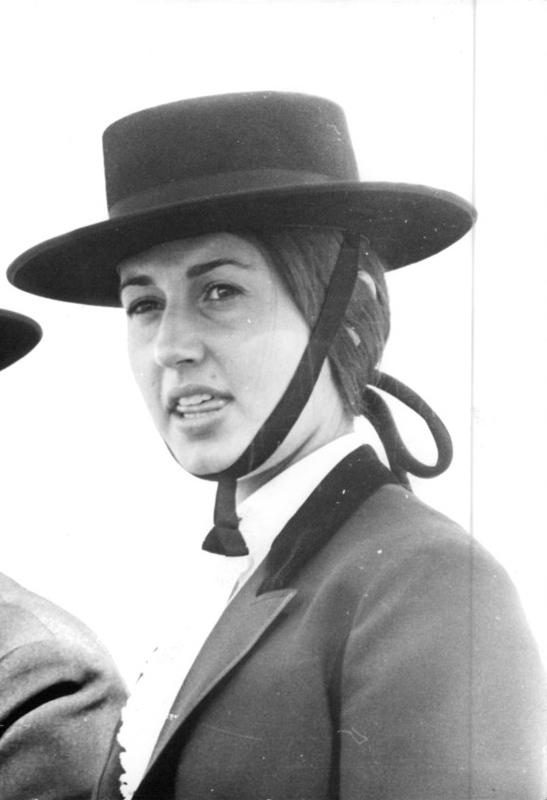
- Martínez-Bordiú in 1969

Duchess of Franco
- Tenure: 4 July 2018 – 21 October 2022
- Predecessor: Carmen Franco
- Successor: Title abolished

Consort of the Legitimist pretender to the French throne
- Pretence: 20 March 1975 – 16 December 1986
- Born: 26 February 1951 (age 75); Madrid, Spain
- Spouses: Alfonso, Duke of Anjou and Cádiz (m. 1972; div. 1982) Jean-Marie Rossi (m. 1984; div. 1995) José Campos García (m. 2006)
- Issue: François, Duke of Bourbon; Louis Alphonse, Duke of Anjou; María Cynthia Rossi
Names
- María del Carmen Esperanza Alejandra de la Santísima Trinidad
- House: Bordiú y Franco (by birth); Bourbon (by marriage)
- Father: Cristóbal Martínez-Bordiú, 10th Marquis of Villaverde
- Mother: Carmen Franco, 1st Duchess of Franco

María del Carmen Martínez-Bordiú y Franco (born 26 February 1951), commonly known as Carmen Martínez-Bordiú, is a Spanish aristocrat and social figure.

Martínez-Bordiú was the 2nd Duchess of Franco from July 2018 until revocation of her dukedom and associated grandeeship on 21 October 2022 as a result of the Democratic Memory Law. She was the granddaughter of former Spanish general and dictator Francisco Franco and this law aimed to remove some of the remaining Franco symbols from the country, including the abolition of her title of nobility, granted to her mother by King Juan Carlos I shortly after General Franco's death.

== Birth and youth ==
Carmen Martínez-Bordiú was born in the Palacio Real de El Pardo in Madrid and was the daughter of Cristóbal Martínez-Bordiú, 10th Marquis of Villaverde, and Carmen Franco, 1st Duchess of Franco. Her maternal grandparents were the fascist dictator (caudillo) Francisco Franco, the Spanish Head of State at the time of her birth and for the next 24 years, and Carmen Polo y Martínez-Valdés, 1st Lady of Meirás. Her paternal grandparents were José María Martínez y Ortega (1890–1970) and María de la O Bordiú y Bascarán, 7th Countess of Argillo (1896–1980).

Martínez-Bordiú was the first grandchild of General Franco. She was born in the Palacio del Pardo, an ancient palace of the Spanish royal family, used as a residence of the president after the declaration of the Spanish Republic, and turned into a republican military site during the Civil war that broke out after Franco's upheaval. The palace was the Franco family residence from 1940, when the Spanish Civil War ended and General Franco became the Spanish Head of State, to after his death in 1975. She has six siblings: María de la O (Mariola), Francisco (Francis), María del Mar (Merry), José Cristóbal (Cristóbal), María de Aránzazu (Arantxa), and Jaime Felipe (Jaime).

== First marriage ==
The 21-year-old Martínez-Bordiú was married on 8 March 1972 in the Chapel of the Palace of El Pardo in Madrid to Prince Alfonso, Duke of Bourbon, elder son of Infante Jaime of Spain, Duke of Segovia, and grandson of King Alfonso XIII of Spain. General Franco subsequently granted Prince Alfonso the title of Duke of Cádiz and the style of Royal Highness.

The couple had two sons:

- François, Dauphin of France, Duke of Bourbon and Brittany (22 November 1972, in Madrid – 7 February 1984, in Pamplona).
- Louis Alphonse, Duke of Anjou (born 1974).

General Franco died on 20 November 1975, and the family lost its political power. Alfonso and Martínez-Bordiú separated in 1979, received a civil divorce in 1982 and a Catholic annulment in 1986. Alfonso was given custody of their sons.

== Second marriage and family tragedies ==
After separating from her first husband in 1979, Martínez-Bordiú lived with a Frenchman, Jean-Marie Rossi (18 November 1930 – 5 December 2021), who was 20 years her elder. Rossi was divorced from Barbara Hottinguer, by whom he had twin daughters, Mathilda and Marella (b. 1971), and a son, Frederick. Martínez-Bordiú and Rossi were married in a civil ceremony on 11 December 1984 in Rueil-Malmaison, with Martínez-Bordiú already around five months pregnant. By the time the child was born, she and her new husband had each suffered the death of a child. In February, Martínez-Bordiú's elder son, François, died in a car accident. Only weeks later, Rossi's elder daughter, Mathilda, died in a boating accident. Martínez-Bordiú then gave birth to her daughter, María Cynthia Francisca Matilda Rossi, in Paris on 28 April 1985.

In January 1989, Martínez-Bordiú's first husband died in a skiing accident in Colorado. He had had custody of their surviving son, Louis Alphonse, and Martínez-Bordiú became involved in a legal battle with her former mother-in-law for custody of the young boy. She lost the battle, and her former mother-in-law gained custody. Martínez-Bordiú and her second husband separated in 1994 and divorced in 1995. She then lived with an Italian man, Roberto Federici, with the relationship ending in 2004.

== Third marriage and grandchildren ==
On 18 June 2006 in Cazalla de la Sierra, Seville, she married a third time to a Spaniard, José Campos García (born in Santander), who was 13 years her junior. She became a grandmother on 5 March 2007 with the birth of granddaughter Eugenia. In 2006, she was a contestant on "Mira quién baila!" ("Look Who's Dancing!"), the Spanish version of "Strictly Come Dancing". On 28 May 2010, Martínez-Bordiú had twin grandsons, Luis and Alfonso. Another grandson, Henri, followed on 1 February 2019.

== Arms ==
Coat of arms of Doña María del Carmen (1951–1972; 1986–2018; 2022–present)

Coat of arms as Duchess of Cádiz (1972–1982)

Coat of arms as titular queen consort of France (1975-1986)

Coat of arms as Duchess of Franco (2018–2022)

== Bibliography ==
- Hola magazine website article (in Spanish)
- 20 Minutos article (in Spanish)
- José Apezarena, Luis Alfonso de Borbón: Un príncipe a la espera, Plaza & Janés, 2007. (in Spanish)
- Barrientos, Paloma (2006). Carmen Martínez-Bordiú : a mi manera (in Spanish). Madrid: Ediciones B. pp. 285, [14] p. : il., 23 cm. ISBN 978-84-666-2982-9. OCLC 85893891.
- Barrientos, Paloma (1994). Carmen Rossi : "la nieta" : biografía. Primer plano. (in Spanish). Barcelona: Ediciones B. pp. 204 p. 24 cm. ISBN 84-406-4746-8. OCLC 434241356.
- Marc Dem, Le duc d'Anjou m'a dit - La vie de l'aîné des Bourbons, Perrin, Paris, 1989. ISBN 2-262-00725-X (in French)
- Zavala, José M. (José María) (2008). El Borbón non grato : la vida silenciada y la muerte violenta del duque de Cadiz (in Spanish). Barcelona: Altera. pp. 438 p., [32] p. of plates : col. ill., facsims., 25 cm. ISBN 978-84-96840-38-6.
- Peñafiel, Jaime. La nieta y el General : tres bodas y un funeral (in Spanish). Madrid: EdicionesTemas de Hoy. pp. 255 p. : ill. (some col.), 24 cm. ISBN 978-84-8460-609-3.

Carmen Martínez-Bordiú Born: 26 February 1951
Spanish nobility
| Preceded by Carmen Franco y Polo | Duchess of Franco; 2018–2022 | Vacant Title abolished |
Titles in pretence
| Preceded by Emmanuelle de Dampierre | — TITULAR — Queen consort of France; Legitimist; 20 March 1975 – 16 December 1986 | Vacant Title next held by Marie Marguerite, Duchess of Anjou |
