= Cercle d'action legitimiste =

French royalist political movement

Circle of Legitimist Action Cercle d'Action Légitimiste
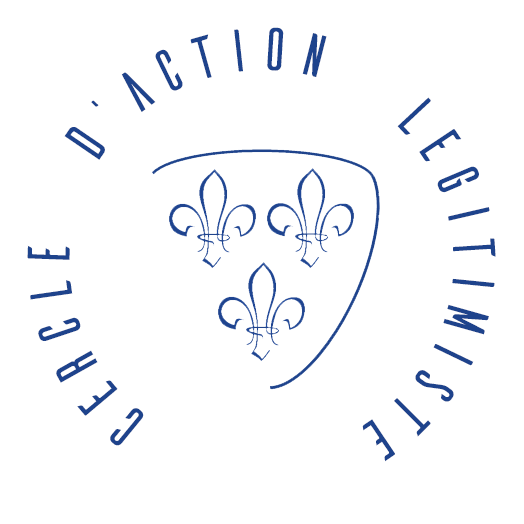
- Abbreviation: CAL
- Founders: Loïc Baverel
- Founded: 19 December 2015; 10 years ago
- Newspaper: Vexilla Galliae
- Youth wing: Cercle Royal des Enfants de France
- Ideology: Monarchism (French); Legitimism
- Political position: Big tent
- Religion: Roman Catholicism
- International affiliation: Internationale Légitimiste
- Colours: White Royal blue
- Slogan: "Pour Dieu, la Patrie et le Roi"

Website
- www.actionlegitimiste.fr

The Cercle d'Action Légitimiste (CAL) is a French legitimist and Catholic association founded in 2015 and which is subject to the Law of 1 July 1901 and the Decree of 16 August 1901 (Association loi de 1901). The Cercle d'Action Légitimiste campaigned for the restoration of royalty in France and promoted traditional royalism by working for the accession to the throne of the eldest of the Capetians and head of the House of Bourbon, Louis de Bourbon, Duke of Anjou, referred to as Louis XX, considered by the Legitimists as the Titular King of France and Navarre.

== Principles and objectives ==
Its objective is to implement a legitimist, counter-revolutionary action, is by nature Catholic. It is based on the Catholic social teaching, and on what the association considers to be the natural order instituted and willed by God.

The CAL seeks to train its members and sympathizers and to perfect their knowledge of the Catholic social teaching and legitimist doctrine, but it also aims to promote among the French the virtues of the Natural Law and the royal solution in order to realise the common good.

The CAL, a counter-revolutionary movement, is in fact opposed to the Orléanists of the Action française, another French monarchist movement that defended the claims to the throne of the Count of Paris, within the framework of a constitutional monarchy.

It rejects popular sovereignty, universal suffrage and liberal democracy, and therefore refuses to participate in national elections. Only participation in local elections, in particular municipal elections, is recognised as worthy of interest in connection with the principle of subsidiarity, provided that one does not vote for candidates affiliated to a republican political party or who publicly promote ideologies or acts condemned by legitimist and Catholic principles.

The CAL rejects the classification between right-wing and left-wing political movements, considering them to be all revolutionary, and therefore refuses to be classified in these terms in the French political game. However Legitimism has been, and therefore also the CAL, is considered to be a movement pertaining to the royalist far-right.

National flag of the CAL

Legitimist flag used by CAL members in some manifestations

Flag of the Mantois delegation of the CAL.

== History ==
The CAL was founded in 2015 by Loïc Baverel. Originally conceived as a branch of the UCLF, Loïc Baverel wanted to change militant methods by creating his own Circle.

In January 2019, Baverel was interviewed by M6 on the occasion of the royalist banquet that traditionally follows the commemorations in memory of Louis XVI and the victims of the Revolution at the Chapelle expiatoire in Paris, he claims that Louis de Bourbon's message in favor of the Yellow vests protests has pushed a large number of people to take an interest in legitimism and the CAL.

== Organization ==
Coat of Arms of the Legitimist International

The Cercle d'action légitimiste had sections in several cities (Paris, Reims, Vannes, Lille, Dunkirk, Strasbourg, Bordeaux, Nancy, Dijon, Chambéry, Nice, etc.) and delegations in several departments or provinces (Delegations of Mantois which covered the Yvelines, Orléanais, Dauphiné, Vendée, Limousin, Lyonnais and Réunion). The majority of these sections and delegations are referenced by the far-left news site StreetPress in Cartofaf, an online map noting the various far-right movements of and in France.

It also has a delegation from Japan made up of French expatriates, Catholics and royalists.

The Legitimist International, also called the White International, was founded by the CAL as an international delegation, it deals with relations between the CAL and foreign royalist and legitimist movements and has representations to some of them (Representation of the Two Sicilies).

The Cercle Royal des Enfants de France (CREF) (English: Royal Circle of Children of France) is associated with the CAL, of whom it is the youth organisation.

== Activism ==
Initially very active on social networks, the CAL has diversified through the creation of its sections and delegations which regularly organize conferences, masses for its members or in memory of royal or counter-revolutionary events or characters, actions of pasting posters or stickers, participation in pilgrimages or various events.

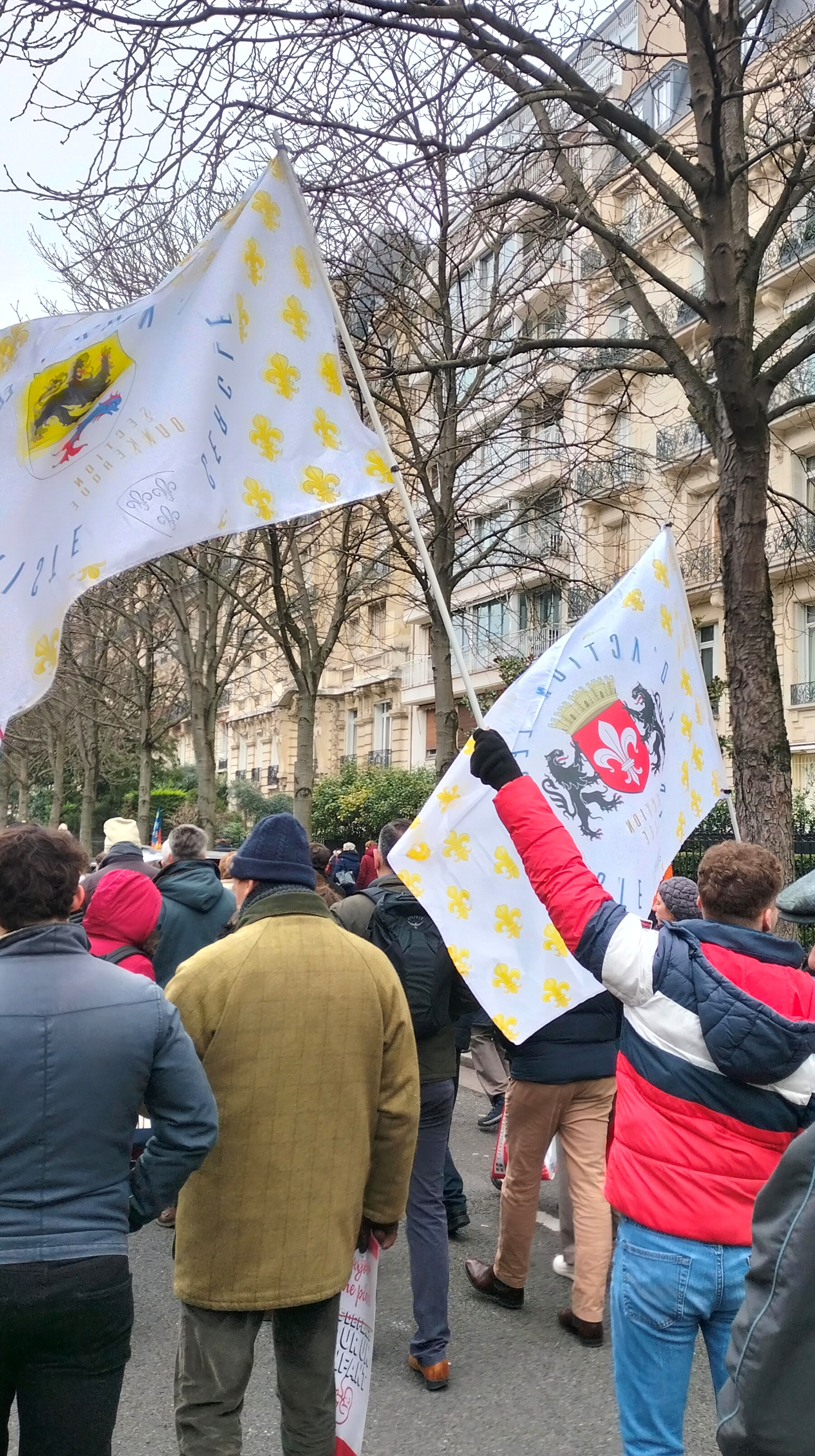
Flags of Dunkirk and Lille CAL's Sections during the March for life 2025 in Paris.

The members of the CAL regularly participated in events organized by other allied legitimist organizations such as the UCLF or the IMB particularly the annual mass organised in memory of Louis XVI or other victims of the French Revolution.

== Publications ==
The CAL has a paper magazine entitled Vexilla Galliae and its online version. Articles on legitimism, Catholic social teaching, militancy, history and current events are regularly published or republished there by prominents traditional catholic priest as Jean-François Thomas (prêtre jésuite) and Régis de Cacqueray.

The youth organisation of the CAL, the CREF also publish a paper magazine Une France, un roi and the website TV Royauté.

== Religious aspects ==
The Circle is placed under the patronage of Saint Mayeul and Saint Odilo, two emblematic saints of Bourbonnais, the province where the CAL was born. His chaplaincy was provided by the Fraternité Royale, a prayer association for Louis de Bourbon, Duke of Anjou.

== Popular culture ==
The CAL is now considered a major royalist movement in France. It is mentioned as such in 2024 in the novel Un peu plus à l'Est by academic Lucien Nouis, who teaches eighteenth-century literature and philosophy at New York University (NYU). and in the novel by Liliane Skalecki from the 8 Volume of her serie : "Ein Fall für Mathilde de Boncourt".

== See also ==
- Bonapartism
- Bourbon Restoration
- Carlism
- France in the long nineteenth century
- French dynastic disputes
- Fundamental laws of the Kingdom of France
- Line of succession to the French throne (Legitimist-Orléanist)
- Loyalism
- Miguelist
- Orléanist
- Party of Order
- René Rémond
- Reactionary
- Royalist
- Succession to the French throne
- Ultra-royalists
- List of movements that dispute the legitimacy of a reigning monarch
