= Legitimists =

French royalist faction

Legitimist flag bearing the great arms of the Legitimist pretender to the crown of France since 1962

The Legitimists (French: Légitimistes) are royalists who adhere to the rights of dynastic succession to the French crown of the descendants of the eldest branch of the Bourbon dynasty, which was overthrown in the 1830 July Revolution. They reject the claim of the July Monarchy of 1830–1848 which placed Louis Philippe, Duke of Orléans, head of the Orléans cadet branch of the Bourbon dynasty, on the throne until he too was dethroned and driven with his family into exile.

Following the movement of Ultra-royalists during the Bourbon Restoration of 1814, Legitimists came to form one of France's three main right-wing factions, which were principally characterized by their counter-revolutionary views. According to historian René Rémond, the other two right-wing factions were the Orléanists and the Bonapartists.

Legitimists believe that the traditional rules of succession, those based upon or found in Salic law, determine the rightful King of France. The last ruling king whom Legitimists acknowledge as legitimate was Charles X, and when the line of his heirs became extinct in 1883 with the death of his grandson Henri, Count of Chambord, the most senior heir to the throne according to the Blancs d'Espagne was Infante Juan, Count of Montizón, a descendant of Louis XIV through his grandson Philip V of Spain.

The fact that all Legitimist claimants since 1883 have been members of the Spanish royal dynasty, as well as the fact that Philip V renounced his and his descendants' claims to the French throne in the Treaty of Utrecht, are irrelevant, according to Legitimists. However, these facts have prompted other French royalists to pivot to support of the Orléans line, members of which would be next in the traditional line of succession if Philip V's heirs were excluded.

The current Legitimist pretender to the French throne is Prince Louis, Duke of Anjou, the senior great-grandson of Alfonso XIII of Spain by male primogeniture, whose line was excluded from the Spanish succession due to the renunciations of Infante Jaime, Duke of Segovia.

== History ==
=== Bourbon Restoration (1814–1830) ===
Following the Bourbon Restoration in 1814, a strongly restricted census suffrage sent to the Chamber of Deputies an Ultra-royalist majority in 1815–1816 (la Chambre introuvable) and from 1824 to 1827. Known to be more royalist than the king (plus royalistes que le roi), the Ultras were the dominant political faction under Louis XVIII (1815–1824) and Charles X (1824–1830). Opposed to the constitutional monarchy of Louis XVIII and to the limitation of the sovereign's power, they hoped to restore the Ancien Régime and cancel the liberal, republican and democratic ideas of the French Revolution. While Louis XVIII hoped to moderate the restoration of Bourbon rule to make it acceptable to the population, the Ultras would never abandon the dream of an integral restoration, even after the 1830 July Revolution which set the Orléanist branch on the throne and sent the Ultras back to private life in their country chateaux. Their importance during the Restoration was in part due to electoral laws which largely favored them (on one hand a Chamber of Peers composed of hereditary members and on the other a Chamber of Deputies elected under a heavily restricted census suffrage which permitted approximately 100,000 voters).

Louis XVIII's first ministers, who included Charles Maurice de Talleyrand-Périgord, Armand-Emmanuel de Vignerot du Plessis, duc de Richelieu and Élie, duc Decazes, were replaced by the Ultra-dominated Chambre introuvable. Louis XVIII finally decided to dissolve this chaotic assembly, but had an equally difficult relationship with the new liberals who replaced them. After the 1820 assassination of Charles Ferdinand, Duke of Berry, the ultra-reactionary son of the comte d'Artois (Louis XVIII's brother and future Charles X) and a short interval during which Richelieu governed, the Ultras were back in government headed by the Jean-Baptiste de Villèle.

The death in 1824 of the moderate Louis XVIII emboldened the Ultra faction. In January 1825, Villèle's government passed the Anti-Sacrilege Act which punished by death the theft of sacred vessels (with or without consecrated hosts). This anachronistic law (according to Jean-Noël Jeanneney) was in the end never applied (except on a minor point) and repealed in the first months of Louis Philippe's reign (1830–1848). The Ultras also wanted to create courts to punish radicals and passed laws restricting the press.

After the 1830 July Revolution replaced the Bourbons with the more liberal Orléanist branch, the Ultras' influence declined, although it survived until at least the 16 May 1877 crisis and 1879. They softened their views and made the restoration of the House of Bourbon their main aim. From 1830 on, they became known as Legitimists.

=== Legitimists under the July Monarchy (1830–1848) ===
During the July Monarchy of 1830 to 1848, when the junior Orléanist branch held the throne, the Legitimists were politically marginalized, many withdrawing from active political life. Until 1844, the situation was complicated by debate as to who the Bourbon heir was, as Charles X and his son, the Dauphin Louis-Antoine had both abdicated during the 1830 Revolution in favor of Charles's young grandson, Henri, Count of Chambord. Until the deaths of Charles X and his son in 1836 and 1844, many Legitimists continued to recognize each of them in turn as the rightful king, ahead of Chambord.

=== Legitimists under the Second Republic and the Second Empire (1848–1871) ===
The fall of King Louis Philippe I in 1848 led to a strengthening of the Legitimist position. Although the childlessness of Chambord weakened the hand of the Legitimists, they came back into political prominence during the Second Republic. Legitimists joined with Orleanists to form the Party of Order which dominated parliament from the elections of May 1849 until Bonaparte's coup on 2 December 1851. They formed a prominent part of Odilon Barrot's ministry from December 1848 to November 1849, and in 1850 were successful in passing the Falloux Law which brought the Catholic Church back into secondary education.

Through much of this time there was discussion of fusion with the Orléanist party in their common interest of a monarchical restoration. This prospect prompted several sons of Louis Philippe to declare their support for Chambord, but fusion was not achieved, and after 1850 the two parties again diverged. The most committed Orléanists supported the candidacy of Louis Philippe's third son, François d'Orléans, Prince of Joinville, for the presidency while the Legitimists largely supported allowing Louis-Napoléon Bonaparte to run for a second term. In spite of this support for Bonaparte's ambitions, they opposed his scheme to restore universal suffrage in the last months of 1851, and their leaders, like those of the Orléanists, were arrested during Bonaparte's coup.

The period of the Second Empire saw the Legitimists once again cast out of active political life.

=== Legitimists under the Third Republic (1871–1940) ===
Nevertheless, the Legitimists remained a significant party within elite opinion, attracting the support of the larger part of the remaining Ancien Régime aristocracy. After the Siege of Paris in 1870 and the 1871 Paris Commune, the Legitimists returned one final time to political prominence. The 8 February 1871 election, held under universal manhood suffrage, gave the National Assembly a royalist majority supported by the provinces while all the Parisian deputies were republican. This time the Legitimists were able to agree with the Orléanists on a program of fusion largely because of the growing likelihood that the Chambord would die without children. The liberal Orléanists agreed to recognize Chambord as king and the Orléanists claimant himself Prince Philippe, Count of Paris (1838–1894) recognized Chambord as head of the French royal house. In return, Legitimists in the Assembly agreed that should Chambord die childless, Philippe d'Orléans would succeed him as king. Unfortunately for French monarchism, Chambord's refusal to accept the tricolor as the flag of France and to abandon the fleur-de-lys, symbol of the Ancien Régime, made restoration impossible until after his death in 1883, by which time the monarchists had long since lost their parliamentary majority due to the 16 May 1877 crisis. The death of Chambord effectively dissolved the Legitimists as a political force in France.

Affected by sinistrisme, few conservatives explicitly called themselves right-wing during the Third Republic as it became a term associated with the counter-revolution and anti-republican feelings and by the 1900s was reserved for reactionary groups. Those Legitimists who had rallied to the Republic in 1893, after Chambord's death ten years before still called themselves Droite constitutionnelle or républicaine (Constitutional or Republican Right). However, they changed their name in 1899 and entered the 1902 elections under the name Action libérale (Liberal Action). By 1910, the only group which openly claimed descent from the right wing gathered only nostalgic royalists. From 1924 on, the term right-wing practically vanished from the parliamentary right's glossary.

By this time, the vast majority of Legitimists had retired to their country chateaux and abandoned the political arena. Although the Action française (French Action) remained an influential movement throughout the 1930s, its motivations for the restoration of monarchy were quite distinct from older Legitimists' views and Charles Maurras' instrumental use of Catholicism set them at odds. Thus, Legitimists participated little in the political events of the 1920s and 1930s, in particular in the 6 February 1934 riots organized by far-right leagues. The royalist aristocrats clearly distinguished themselves from the new ultra right which was influenced by the emerging movements of fascism and Nazism. However, Legitimists joined Maurras in celebrating the fall of the Third Republic after the 1940 Battle of France as a divine surprise and many of them entered Philippe Pétain's Vichy administration, seeing a golden opportunity to impose a reactionary program in occupied France.

=== Legitimists under Vichy and after World War II (1940–1989) ===
French royalism largely receded to irrelevance in World War II and beyond. While before World War II, many French conservatives and other members of the right also harbored royalist aspirations, conservative movements dropped this platform during and after the war. Charles de Gaulle's center-rightist Gaullism explicitly repudiated monarchism, and far-right organizations disdained the old aristocratic elite. According to historian René Rémond's studies of right-wing factions in France, Legitimists strongly supported the Vichy regime; nevertheless, they received little from the Vichy government, and the regime emphasized Catholic traditionalism rather than a return to aristocracy.

Legitimism revived after the Second World War for several reasons.

- In 1946, the senior Capetian heir, Infante Jaime, Duke of Segovia, the eldest surviving son of King Alfonso XIII of Spain, who 13 years earlier had renounced his rights to the throne of Spain on account of his deafness, took up the courtesy title of Duke of Anjou.
- The academic work of historians like Hervé Pinoteau, jurists like Guy Augé and Stéphane Rials or genealogists like Patrick Van Kerrebrouck challenging the Orléanist theses have received a certain response from the public.
- The positions taken by Henri d'Orléans, Count of Paris, in particular in favor of General de Gaulle, Algerian independence and François Mitterrand shocked certain royalists.
- During the Capetian millennium of 1987, the then senior Capetian heir, Alfonso de Bourbon, Duke of Anjou and Cadiz, elder son of the aforementioned Infante Jaime, made himself known by presiding over numerous commemorative ceremonies. In the wake of the Capetian millennium, media personalities like Thierry Ardisson popularized Legitimist conceptions.

Since the accession of King Juan Carlos I of Spain in 1975, the senior Capetian heirs have not laid claim to the throne of Spain. The Legitimist suitor having had French nationality (which he had since birth, owing to his French mother) in 1987, and passing the nationality on to his son (the current suitor), certain arguments of the partisans of Orléans would have become obsolete.

According to René Rémond, Marcel Lefebvre's Society of Saint Pius X, founded in 1970, shares aspects with the Legitimist movement. Nevertheless, Legitimism is a largely spent force.

=== Legitimism from 1989 to present, under the pretendence of Louis de Bourbon ===
Current legitimism has several instances:

- The private secretariat of Louis de Bourbon, which takes care of his public affairs (diary, outings and official participation in the various events to which he is invited).
- The Secretariat also manages the Prince's communication and in particular his official website www.legitimite.fr as well as his presence on social networks.
- On the cultural level, the Institute of the House of Bourbon (IMB) was founded in 1973 at the request of Jacques-Henri de Bourbon. It was recognized as being of public utility in 1997. Its honorary president is Prince Louis, Duke of Anjou and its president, Charles Emmanuel, Duke of Bauffremont (born 1946), who succeeded his father in this position. In order to make better known the work of the kings who made France, the IMB organizes symposiums, conferences, travel exhibitions, and various commemorations. It also has a sponsorship and heritage protection action (commemorative plaques, restoration of graves, monuments, etc.)
- The Union of Legitimist Circles of France (UCLF), founded in 1979 by Gérard Saclier de La Bâtie. Its objective is to encourage the study of French historical legitimacy and to make the monarchy known. It brings together a large number of associations and circles and organizes political training days and demonstrations.
- Le Cercle d'action legitimiste (CAL), founded in 2012 by Loïc Baverel. Originally conceived as a branch of the UCLF, Loïc Baverel wanted to change militant methods by creating his own grouping. The objective of the CAL is political and aims to professionalize the militant approach in order to promote Legitimist principles.

== Spanish Bourbons ==
A remnant of Legitimists, known as the Blancs d'Espagne (Whites of Spain), by repudiating Philip V's renunciation of the French throne as ultra vires and contrary to the fundamental French monarchical law, upheld the rights of the eldest branch of the Bourbons, represented as of 1883 by the Carlist pretender to the Spanish throne. This group was initially minuscule, but it began to grow larger after World War II due both to the political leftism of the Orléanist pretender Henri, Count of Paris and to the active efforts of the claimants of the elder line after extinction of the Carlist male line—Infante Jaime, Duke of Segovia, the disinherited second son of Alfonso XIII of Spain; and his son Prince Alphonse, Duke of Anjou—to secure Legitimist support, such that by the 1980s the elder line had fully reclaimed for its supporters the political title of Legitimists.

The Spanish-born Prince Luis Alfonso is the Bourbon whom the French Legitimists consider to be the de jure king of France under the name Louis XX. A 1987 attempt by the Orléanist heir (and other Bourbons, none of the elder branch) to contest Louis-Alphonse's use of the Anjou title and to deny him use of the plain coat of arms of France was dismissed by the French courts in March 1989 for lack of jurisdiction (the courts did not address the merits of the claims). He is a French citizen through his paternal grandmother and is generally recognised as the senior legitimate representative of the House of Capet.

== Dynastic arguments ==
Legitimists consider the valid rationale for restoration and the order of succession to the French throne derives from fundamental laws of the Ancien Régime, which were formed in the early centuries of the Capetian monarchy.

According to these rules, monarchy is the basic form of government and the monarch the indispensable executive of government, succession to the throne being hereditary and passing by Salic primogeniture. Thus, females and any male who is not the premier né (i.e. the legitimate eldest descendant of the most senior Capetian line) are excluded from the throne. The king must also be Catholic.

Other tenets of the Legitimist position are the following:

- Continuity (or immediacy) of the crown as upon the death of a monarch his heir automatically and immediately becomes king without the need of any formal act of investiture and even if political circumstances would not allow him to actually take power.
- Unavailability (or inalienability) of the crown as it is not the personal property of the king, therefore nobody, not even the king himself, can alter the line of succession by abdication, renunciation, or appointment of an heir of his own choosing. This argument is crucial for Legitimists regarding the continuing validity of the rights of succession of the Spanish line of Philip V and his descendants. According to this view, Philip's renunciation of his rights of succession to the French throne in the Treaty of Utrecht of 1713 was null and void and therefore his descendants still retain their claim to the French throne ahead of the Orléans line.

It has been a point of contention within the Legitimist camp to what extent French nationality constitutes a precondition for royal succession. While adherents of the Spanish Anjou line argue that princes of foreign nationality can still succeed to the French crown, others hold that French nationality of both the claimant and his ancestors is a requirement.

== List of Legitimist claimants to the French throne ==
Claimant	Portrait	Birth	Marriages	Death
Louis XVI of France; 1792–1793		23 August 1754, Versailles; Son of Louis, Dauphin of France and Marie-Josèphe of Saxony, Dauphine of France	Marie Antoinette of Austria; 16 May 1770; 4 children	21 January 1793; Paris; Aged 38
Louis-Charles, Dauphin of France (Louis XVII); 1793–1795		27 March 1785, Versailles; Son of Louis XVI of France and Marie Antoinette of Austria	Never married	8 June 1795; Paris; Aged 10
Louis XVIII; 1795–1824 (King of France 1814–1815, 1815–1824)		17 November 1755, Versailles; Son of Louis, Dauphin of France and Marie-Josèphe of Saxony, Dauphine of France	Marie Joséphine of Savoy; 14 May 1771; No children	16 September 1824; Paris; Aged 68
Charles X 1824–1836 (King of France 1824–1830)		9 October 1757, Versailles; Son of Louis, Dauphin of France and Marie-Josèphe of Saxony, Dauphine of France	Marie Thérèse of Savoy; 16 November 1773; 3 children	6 November 1836; Gorizia; Aged 79
Louis Antoine, Duke of Angoulême (Louis XIX); 1836–1844		6 August 1775, Versailles; Son of Charles X and Marie Thérèse of Savoy	Marie-Thérèse, Duchess of Angoulême; 10 June 1799; No children	3 June 1844; Gorizia; Aged 68
Henri, Count of Chambord (Henri V); 1844–1883		29 September 1820, Paris; Son of Charles Ferdinand, Duke of Berry and Marie-Caroline of Bourbon-Two Sicilies, Duchess of Berry	Marie Thérèse of Austria-Este; 7 November 1846; No children	24 August 1883; Schloss Frohsdorf; Aged 63

=== The succession after Henri, Count of Chambord ===
==== House of Orléans ====
In the 1870s, the rival Legitimist and Orléanist claimants agreed for the sake of restoration of the monarchy in France to end their rivalry. Philippe d'Orléans, Count of Paris and grandson of Louis Philippe I, accepted the prior claim to the throne of Chambord, who remained childless; Chambord in turn acknowledged that Philippe would claim the right to succeed him as heir, and after his death many Legitimists accepted the descendants of Philippe as the rightful pretenders and became known as Unionists.

Claimant	Portrait	Birth	Marriages	Death
Philippe, Count of Paris (Philippe VII); 1883–1894		24 August 1838; Paris; Son of Prince Ferdinand Philippe, Duke of Orléans and Duchess Helen of Mecklenburg-Schwerin	Princess Marie Isabelle of Orléans; 30 May 1864; 8 children	8 September 1894; Stowe House; Aged 56
Philippe, Duke of Orléans (Philippe VIII); 1894–1926		24 August 1869; York House, Twickenham; Son of Philippe, Count of Paris and Princess Marie Isabelle of Orléans	Archduchess Maria Dorothea of Austria; 5 November 1896; No children	28 March 1926; Palermo; Aged 56
Jean, Duke of Guise (Jean III); 1926–1940		4 September 1874; France; Son of Robert, Duke of Chartres and Marie-Françoise of Orléans	Isabelle of Orléans; 30 October 1899; 4 children	25 August 1940; Larache, Spanish Morocco; Aged 65
Henri, Count of Paris (Henri VI); 1940–1999		5 July 1908; Chateau de Nouvion-en-Thiérache, Aisne, France; Son of Jean, Duke of Guise and Isabelle of Orléans	Isabelle of Orléans-Braganza; 8 April 1931; 11 children	19 June 1999; Chérisy; Aged 90
Henri, Count of Paris (Henri VII); 1999–2019		June 14, 1933; Woluwe-Saint-Pierre, Belgium; Son of Henri, Count of Paris and Isabelle of Orléans-Braganza	Marie Thérèse, Duchess of Montpensier; 5 July 1957; 5 children Micaëla Cousiño Quiñones de León; 31 October 1984 (Civil); 26 September 2009 (Religious)	21 January 2019; Paris; Aged 85
Jean, Count of Paris (Jean IV); 2019–present		May 19, 1965; Boulogne-Billancourt, Paris, France; Son of Henri, Count of Paris and Marie-Thérèse of Württemberg	Philomena de Tornos Steinhart; 19 March 2009; 5 children	

==== House of Bourbon-Anjou ====
Those Legitimists who did not accept the Orléanist line as the successors of Chambord argued that the renunciation of the French throne by Philip V of Spain, second grandson of Louis XIV, was invalid; in 1883 (when Chambord died childless), the throne passed by right to Philip V's heirs in the male-line. In 1883, the senior male of the Spanish branch of Bourbons was Infante Juan, Count of Montizón. His father, Infante Carlos, Count of Molina, had lost Spain's throne in favour of his niece, the non-Salic heiress of his elder brother, Isabella II and his lineage became known as the Carlist pretenders in Spain.

When the Carlist branch died out in 1936, the French claim was inherited by the Isabelline Spanish line. As Isabella II's consort and (official) father of her children was her paternal first cousin, Francisco de Asís, Duke of Cádiz, (a male-line grandson of Charles IV via his third son, Infante Francisco de Paula of Spain) their grandson, Alfonso XIII, was now the most senior agnatic descendant of Philip V (although by that time Alfonso had been dethroned by the Second Spanish Republic). The French and Spanish claims separated at Alfonso's death as his eldest surviving son Infante Jaime, Duke of Segovia renounced his claim to the Spanish throne due to physical disability and some years later asserted a claim to the French succession based on Legitimist principles. The present French Legitimist claimant descends from Jaime while the present king of Spain descends from his younger brother Don Juan.

Claimant	Portrait	Birth	Marriages	Death
Infante Juan, Count of Montizón (Jean III); 1883–1887		15 May 1822, Aranjuez; Son of Infante Carlos, Count of Molina and Infanta Maria Francisca of Portugal	Maria Beatrix of Austria-Este; 6 February 1847; 2 children	18 November 1887; Hove; Aged 65
Infante Carlos, Duke of Madrid (Charles XI); 1887–1909		30 March 1848, Ljubljana; Son of Infante Juan, Count of Montizón and Maria Beatrix of Austria-Este	Princess Margherita of Bourbon-Parma; 4 February 1867; 5 children Princess Berthe de Rohan; 28 April 1894; No children	18 July 1909; Varese; Aged 61
Infante Jaime, Duke of Madrid (Jacques I); 1909–1931		27 June 1870, Vevey; Son of Infante Carlos, Duke of Madrid and Princess Margherita of Bourbon-Parma	Never married	2 October 1931; París; Aged 61
Infante Alfonso Carlos, Duke of San Jaime (Charles XII); 1931–1936		12 September 1849; London; Son of Infante Juan, Count of Montizón and Maria Beatrix of Austria-Este	Infanta Maria das Neves of Portugal; 26 April 1871; No children	29 September 1936; Vienna; Aged 87
Alfonso XIII of Spain (Alphonse I); 1936–1941		17 May 1886, Madrid; Son of Alfonso XII of Spain and Maria Christina of Austria	Victoria Eugenie of Battenberg; 31 May 1906; 7 children	28 February 1941; Rome; Aged 54
Infante Jaime, Duke of Segovia (Henri VI); 1941–1975		23 June 1908, Segovia; Son of Alfonso XIII of Spain and Victoria Eugenie of Battenberg	First marriage Emmanuelle de Dampierre; 4 March 1935; Rome; Divorced on 6 May 1947; 2 children Second marriage (civil only, not recognized by the Church); Charlotte Luise Auguste Tiedemann; 3 August 1949; Vienna; No children	20 March 1975; St. Gallen; Aged 67
Prince Alphonse, Duke of Anjou and Cádiz (Alphonse II); 1975–1989		20 April 1936, Rome; Son of Infante Jaime, Duke of Segovia and Emmanuelle de Dampierre	María del Carmen Martínez-Bordiú y Franco; 8 March 1972; Royal Palace of El Pardo; Divorced on 1982 and annulled in 1986; 2 children	30 January 1989; Beaver Creek; Aged 53
Prince Louis, Duke of Anjou (Louis XX); 1989–present		25 April 1974, Madrid; Son of Alfonso, Duke of Anjou and Cádiz and María del Carmen Martínez-Bordiú y Franco	María Margarita Vargas Santaella; 5 November 2004; Caracas; 4 children	

== Electoral results ==
These are the results for broadly Legitimist parties in French national elections.

Election year	No. of overall votes	% of overall vote	No. of overall seats won	+/–	Leader
1831	28,270	22.6	104 / 460	0	François-René de Chateaubriand
1834	4,218	3.3	15 / 460	▼89	Pierre-Antoine Berryer
1837	4,855	3.2	15 / 460	–	Pierre-Antoine Berryer
1839	8,655	4.3	20 / 460	▲5	Pierre-Antoine Berryer
National Assembly (French Third Republic)
1871	Unknown (2nd)	?	182 / 675	▲182	Auguste-Alexandre Ducrot
1876	332,470	4.5	24 / 553	▼158	Auguste-Alexandre Ducrot
1877	687,422	8.5	44 / 521	▲20	Auguste-Alexandre Ducrot

== See also ==
- Bonapartism
- Bourbon Restoration
- Carlism
- France in the long nineteenth century
- French dynastic disputes
- Fundamental laws of the Kingdom of France
- Gustavians
- Jacobitism
- Line of succession to the former French throne (Orléanist)
- Loyalism
- Miguelist
- Orléanist
- Party of Order
- René Rémond
- Reactionary
- Royalist
- Succession to the French throne
- Ultra-royalists
- List of movements that dispute the legitimacy of a reigning monarch
- Bourbon-Orléanist Restoration Project
