= Louis Alphonse de Bourbon =

Spanish-French aristocrat

- Duke of Anjou (more)
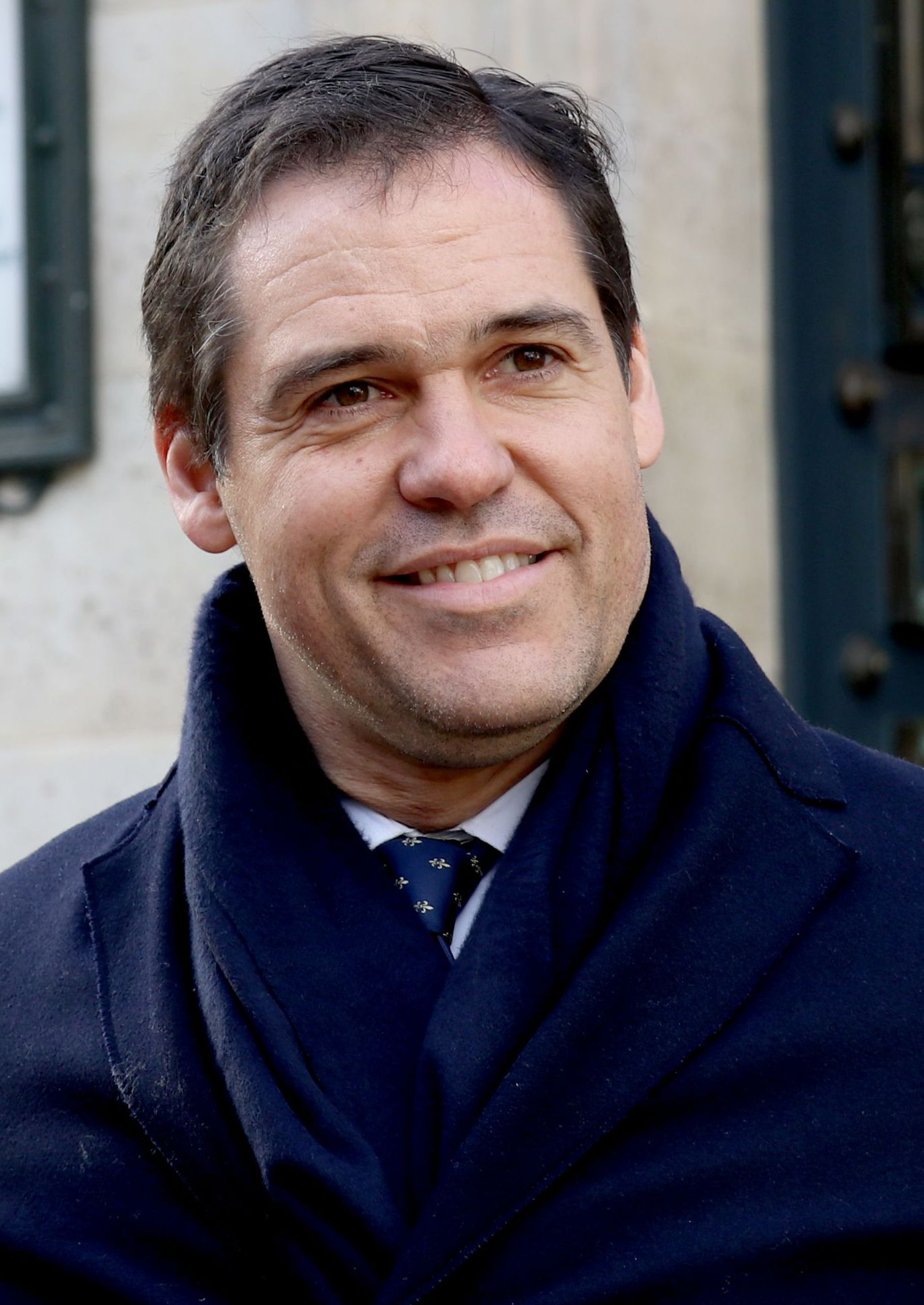
- Pictured in 2020

Legitimist pretender to the French throne
- Pretence: 30 January 1989 – present
- Predecessor: Alfonso, Duke of Anjou and Cádiz
- Heir apparent: Luis de Borbón
- Born: Luis Alfonso Gonzalo Víctor Manuel Marco de Borbón y Martínez-Bordiú; 25 April 1974 (age 52); Madrid, Spain
- Spouse: María Margarita Vargas Santaella (m. 2004)
- Issue: Eugenia de Borbón y Vargas; Luis de Borbón y Vargas; Alfonso de Borbón y Vargas; Henri de Borbón y Vargas
- House: Bourbon
- Father: Alfonso, Duke of Anjou and Cádiz
- Mother: Carmen Martínez-Bordiú
- Religion: Roman Catholic

Louis Alphonse de Bourbon, Duke of Anjou (Spanish: Luis Alfonso Gonzalo Víctor Manuel Marco de Borbón y Martínez-Bordiú; born 25 April 1974) is regarded by French Legitimists as the head of the House of Bourbon and the rightful claimant to the defunct throne of France under the name Louis XX. His claim is based on his descent from Louis XIV (r. 1643–1715) through his grandson Philip V of Spain. Philip renounced his claim to the French throne under the Treaty of Utrecht in 1713. The rival Orleanist pretenders argue that this, as well as being born a Spanish citizen, makes Louis Alphonse ineligible for the throne.

Louis Alphonse is patrilineally the senior great-grandson of King Alfonso XIII of Spain. His grandfather Infante Jaime, Duke of Segovia, renounced his rights to the Spanish throne for himself and his descendants owing to his deafness. The crown of Spain has descended to his second cousin, King Felipe VI. Through his mother, he is also a great-grandson of Spain's caudillo (leader) General Francisco Franco; and through his father, a great-great-great-grandson of Queen Victoria of the United Kingdom. Since the death of his father in 1989, he has used the courtesy title of Duke of Anjou.

== Early life ==
=== Birth ===
Louis Alphonse was born in Madrid, the second son of Alfonso de Borbón, Duke of Anjou and Cádiz, and of his wife María del Carmen Martínez-Bordiú y Franco, eldest granddaughter of Francisco Franco. Alfonso was at that time the dauphin (using "Duke of Bourbon" as title of pretence) according to those who supported the Legitimist "claim" of his father, Infante Jaime, Duke of Segovia to the French throne. On 20 March 1975, Jaime died, and Alfonso then asserted his claim to be Head of the House of Bourbon and Legitimist claimant to the throne of France. As such, he took the title "Duke of Anjou".

=== Childhood ===
Louis Alphonse's parents separated in 1982, and their Catholic marriage was annulled in 1986. His mother has since remarried civilly twice; he had two stepsisters Mathilda (deceased) and Marella, and a stepbrother Frederick, all born before his mother's marriage to Jean-Marie Rossi and a half-sister, Cynthia Rossi, born afterwards. On 7 February 1984, Louis Alphonse's older brother Francisco died as the result of a car crash in which Louis Alphonse was also injured, although less so than their father, who was driving the automobile. From that date Louis Alphonse was recognised as the heir apparent to his father by the Legitimists. As such, he was given the additional title Duke of Bourbon on 27 September 1984 by his father. In 1987, the Spanish government declared that titles traditionally attached to the dynasty (such as the Dukedom of Cádiz) would henceforth be borne by its members on a lifetime only basis, forestalling Louis Alphonse from inheriting that grandeeship.

=== Education ===
Louis Alphonse took his primary studies at College Molière, a bilingual school, where he earned his baccalaureate. In 1991, he was admitted to CUNEF University, where he earned a master's degree in international finance. Louis is multilingual, speaking English, Spanish, and French (in addition to some Italian and German).

== Succession ==
Coat of arms as pretender to the French throne

On 30 January 1989, his father died in a skiing accident near Vail, Colorado. In 1994, Louis Alphonse received 150 million pesetas from a lawsuit against Vail Associates, which owned the ski resort where the accident occurred. Louis Alphonse was recognised by some members of the Capetian dynasty as Chef de la Maison de Bourbon (Head of the House of Bourbon) and took the title Duke of Anjou, but not his father's Spanish dukedom. Legitimists consider him the rightful pretender to the defunct French throne.

Louis Alphonse was the heir apparent to his mother's Spanish Dukedom of Franco and Grandeeship until the abolition of the titles by the Democratic Memory Law.

In 2002, Louis Alphonse was elected by the French Society of the Cincinnati as the representative of Louis XVI. He is also an honorary member of the "Academia de Historia y Geografía Militar del Paraguay" (Academy of History and Military Geography of Paraguay).

In addition to his Spanish citizenship, Louis Alphonse acquired French nationality through his paternal grandmother, Emmanuelle de Dampierre, also a French citizen. He attended the Lycée Français de Madrid, obtaining his COU in June 1992. He studied economics at the IESE Business School. He worked several years for BNP Paribas, a French bank in Madrid.

In 2017, Louis Alphonse stated that he wishes for the remains of his ancestors, including King Charles X, to remain at the Kostanjevica Monastery in Slovenia, after a movement reportedly began to have the King's remains moved to be buried along with other French monarchs in Basilica of St Denis.

In 2021, Louis Alphonse attended the wedding of Grand Duke George Mikhailovich of Russia.

== Politics ==
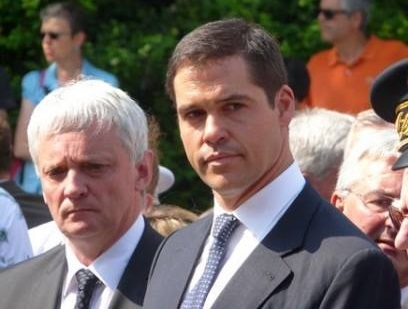
With Thierry Lazaro in 2014

The political, institutional and social state of our country continues to worsen. I consider it my role as head of the House of Bourbon and heir of the dynasty that made France to speak on the issue...At a moment of decision, I hope that the monarchical legacy of which I am the trustee is still sufficiently vibrant in the heart of my compatriots to be a source of inspiration and, I must say, hope." - Louis Alphonse de Bourbon, in October 2025, amid the 2024–2025 French political crisis.

Louis Alphonse describes himself as a monarchist, "but not anti-republican". He argues for a constitutional monarchy, with a king who acts as moral authority, foreign ambassador, unifying figure, and reminder of a nation's history.

He opposes same-sex marriage, same-sex adoption, euthanasia, and abortion.

He holds ties to the right-wing populist Spanish political party Vox and is a close friend of its leader, Santiago Abascal. In March 2018, Louis Alphonse was named honorary president of the Francisco Franco National Foundation, a position held by his grandmother, Carmen Franco, 1st Duchess of Franco, until her death in December 2017. On 15 July, later that year, he headed a Movement-for-Spain demonstration at the Valley of the Fallen monument, leading supporters of the late Spanish dictator, his great-grandfather Francisco Franco. They opposed the Spanish social democratic government's plan to remove Franco's remains from a basilica near Madrid. He also launched a change.org petition, calling for the resignation of the social democratic Prime Minister Pedro Sánchez.

In 2019, he expressed public support for the yellow vests movement in France. Later that year, he spoke at the World Congress of Families XIII, where he called for a return to "Christian society".

In 2025, he offered to replace French President Emmanuel Macron saying, "My family has served France for centuries, and if France asks, I will be at its service."

== Marriage and children ==
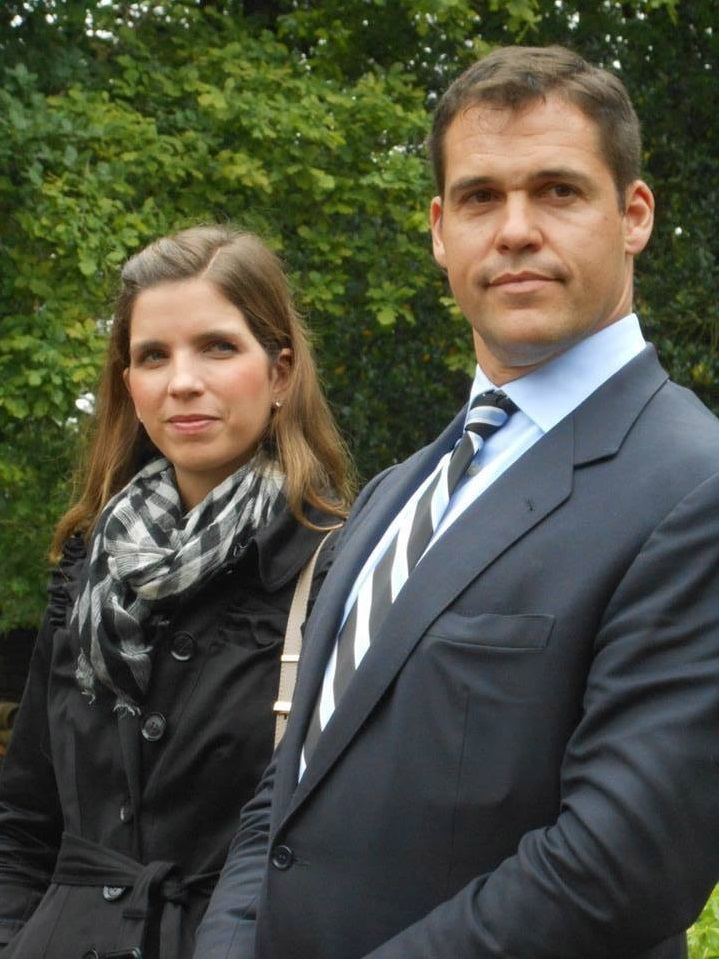
With his wife in 2015

Louis Alphonse's engagement to marry María Margarita Vargas Santaella, the daughter of Venezuelan businessman Victor Vargas, was announced in November 2003. They were married civilly in Caracas on 5 November 2004 and religiously on 6 November 2004 in La Romana, Dominican Republic. None of the members of the Spanish royal family attended the wedding. Although no official reason was given, it was no secret that the then king of Spain, Juan Carlos I, did not approve his cousin's claim to the French throne, nor the fact that Louis Alphonse issued the wedding invitations styled as "Duke of Anjou".

Louis Alphonse and María Margarita had their first child, Eugénie, on 5 March 2007 at Mount Sinai Medical Center in Miami, Florida. She was baptised in June 2007 at the papal nunciature in Paris. Her godparents are Prince Charles-Emmanuel of Bourbon-Parma and his wife, Constance. French Legitimists recognize her as Eugénie, Madame Royale, the style commonly attributed to the eldest unmarried daughter of a king of France (in Spain her name is Doña Eugenia de Borbón y Vargas).

The couple had twin sons, Louis and Alphonse, on 28 May 2010 in New York City. Their father has conferred upon them the historic French titles of, respectively, Duke of Burgundy (duc de Bourgogne) and Duke of Berry (duc de Berry). In Spain, the twins are Don Luis and Don Alfonso de Borbón y Vargas.

Their fourth child, Henri, was born on 1 February 2019 in New York and was granted the title of Duke of Touraine (duc de Touraine) by his father.

== Financial controversies ==
Through his marriage to María Margarita Vargas Santaella, Louis Alphonse became closely linked to the Banco Occidental de Descuento (BOD) financial group, owned by his father-in-law Victor Vargas, a Venezuelan banker known colloquially as "the banker of Chavismo" for the growth of his empire during the governments of Hugo Chávez. Between 2005 and 2019, Louis Alphonse served as International Vice President of BOD and also sat on the board of two of its offshore subsidiaries: AllBank Corp in Panama and Banco del Orinoco N.V. in Curaçao. According to investigative reports, his aristocratic profile and status as a claimant to the French throne lent an air of prestige and credibility to the group, helping to attract investors and depositors who associated his name with financial trustworthiness.

In Luxembourg, Louis Alphonse incorporated a company called Mella SA. On 23 February 2016, he appointed Mario Nunzio Rao as the company's financial administrator. Rao had previously served in the same capacity at Galloix Holding, a Swiss firm which, according to data from Spain's Central Operative Unit (UCO), had allegedly been used by former banker Mario Conde to launder money obtained through the looting of Banco Banesto.

When Mella SA was dissolved at the end of 2020, its assets revealed Louis Alphonse's involvement in two loss-making Spanish companies: Reto 48 España 2015 SL, a chain of two gyms in Madrid that had recorded losses of €158,480 in 2019 alone, and Spanish Influencers 2017 SL, a social media marketing company of which Louis Alphonse presented himself as general director and which had not filed accounts since its first year of activity, when it lost more than €84,000 against revenues of just €34,000.

In September 2019, Panamanian banking authorities intervened and ordered the liquidation of AllBank Corp after finding it unable to guarantee depositor funds. Days earlier, the Central Bank of Curaçao had declared Banco del Orinoco N.V. bankrupt, finding that it had presented fraudulent documentation regarding its assets—particularly Venezuelan sovereign bonds—to justify its solvency. The collapse of both institutions left approximately 2,441 affected clients and an estimated debt of $854 million.

In February 2022, investigative journalism consortium Suisse Secrets revealed that Louis Alphonse and Margarita Vargas had appeared as signatories on a Credit Suisse account holding approximately 1.2 million euros between 2007 and 2017, held in the name of a Panamanian company. A spokesman for Louis Alphonse stated that he held only "authorized signature" on the account and that the funds belonged to his wife, and that the account was closed in 2017.

In April 2021, a Panamanian law firm filed a criminal complaint against the board of AllBank—of which Louis Alphonse was a member—on behalf of companies claiming damages exceeding $20 million, alleging misappropriation of $15 million.

On 2 October 2025, the trustee of the Curaçao court overseeing the Banco del Orinoco N.V. case filed a criminal complaint before the Curaçao Public Prosecutor's Office for alleged "fraudulent bankruptcy." The complaint named Victor Vargas, Louis Alphonse, and other directors of the bank, accusing them of mismanagement of assets of approximately $1.5 billion and document forgery. In the event of a conviction, victims could seek the seizure of assets in Curaçao, the Netherlands, and other EU countries through judicial cooperation mechanisms.

== Bibliography ==
- Thierry Ardisson. Louis XX. Contre-enquête sur la monarchie., Olivier Orban, 1986, ISBN 2-85565-334-7
- Jean Foyer, Titre et armes du prince Louis de Bourbon, Diffusion-Université-Culture, 1990.
- Apezarena, José. Luis Alfonso de Borbón: Un príncipe a la espera, Random House Mondadori, 2007, ISBN 978-84-01-30552-8.
- Cassani Pironti, Fabio. "Bref crayon généalogique de S.A.R. la Princesse Marie-Marguerite, Duchesse d'Anjou, née Vargas Santaella", Le Lien Légitimiste, n. 16, 2007.
- Opfell, Olga S. H.R.H. Louis-Alphonse, Prince of Bourbon, Duke of Anjou: Royal House of France (House of Bourbon), Royalty Who Wait: The 21 Heads of Formerly Regnant Houses of Europe. Jefferson: McFarland & Company, Inc., Publishers, 2001. 11–32.

Louis XX of France House of Bourbon Cadet branch of the Capetian dynasty Born: 25 April 1974
Titles in pretence
Preceded by Alfonso, Duke of Anjou and Cádiz	— TITULAR — King of France and Navarre; 30 January 1989 – present Reason for succession failure: Bourbon monarchy deposed in 1830	Incumbent; Heir: Louis, Dauphin of France
Preceded by François	— TITULAR — Dauphin of France; 7 February 1984 - 30 January 1989	Vacant Title next held by Louis
