= Carmen Franco, 1st Duchess of Franco =

Spanish noblewoman (1926–2017)

María del Carmen Franco y Polo
- Marchioness of Villaverde
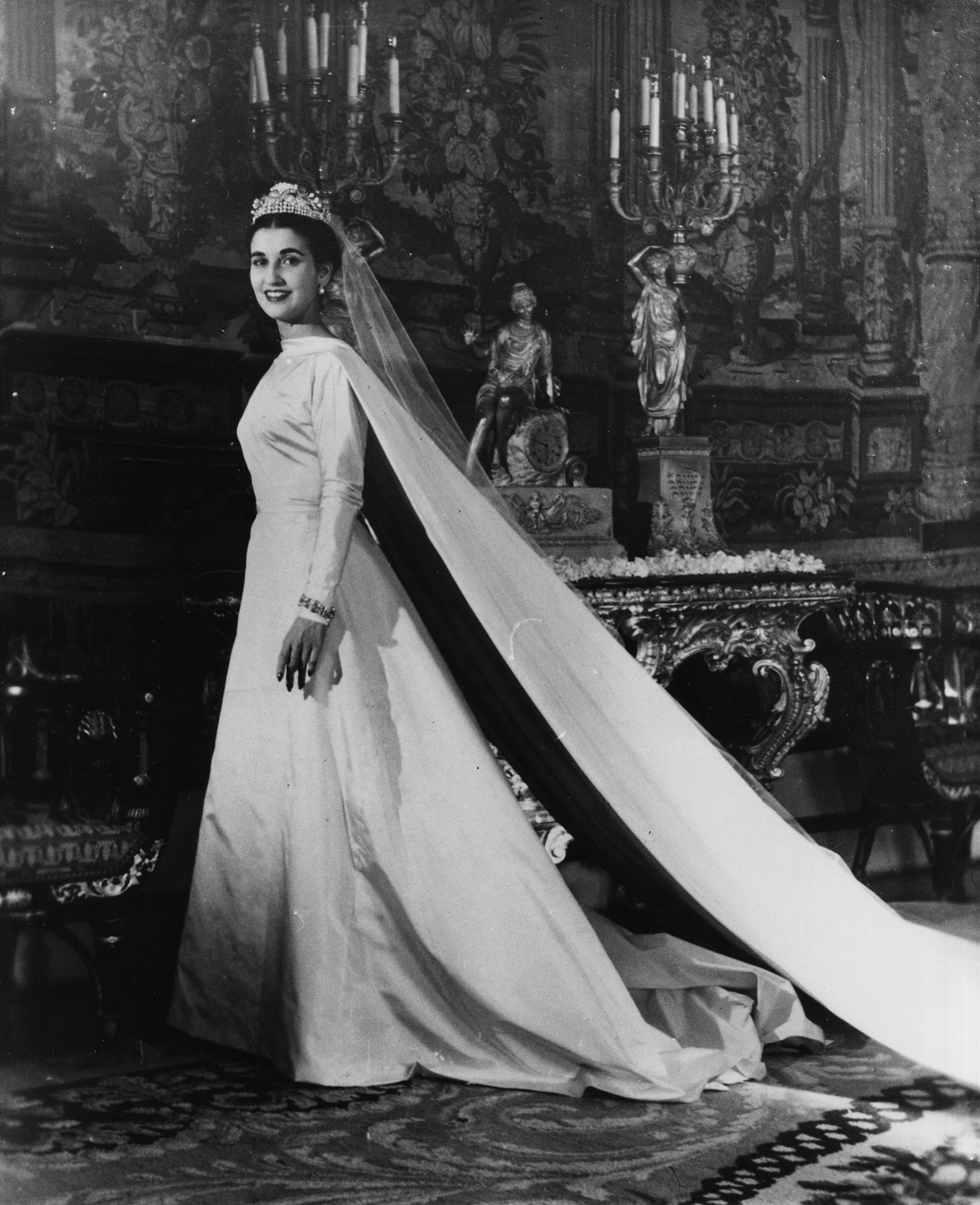
- Pictured on her wedding day in 1950.

Duchess of Franco
- Tenure: 26 November 1975 – 29 December 2017
- Successor: Carmen Martínez-Bordiú
- Born: María del Carmen Franco y Polo; 14 September 1926; Oviedo, Asturias, Spain
- Died: 29 December 2017 (aged 91); Madrid, Spain
- Spouse: Cristóbal Martínez-Bordiú, 10th Marquis of Villaverde (m. 1950; died 1998)
- Issue: Carmen Martínez-Bordiú, 2nd Duchess of Franco; María de la O Martínez-Bordiú; Francisco Franco, 2nd Lord of Meirás; María del Mar Martínez-Bordiu; José Cristóbal Martínez-Bordiú; María de Aránzazu Martínez-Bordiú; Jaime Felipe Martínez-Bordiú
- Father: Francisco Franco
- Mother: Carmen Polo, 1st Lady of Meirás

Coat of arms of the 1st Duchess of Franco

María del Carmen Franco y Polo, 1st Duchess of Franco, Grandee of Spain, Marchioness of Villaverde (14 September 1926 – 29 December 2017) was the only child of Spain's caudillo, General Francisco Franco and Carmen Polo y Martínez-Valdés. In Asturian fashion, she was known by many nicknames, such as Nenuca, Carmelilla, Carmencita, Cotota and Morita.

== Family ==
Franco was born in Oviedo. Officially, she was the daughter of Francisco Franco and Carmen Polo. However, historian and hispanist Paul Preston claims that she may have actually been the biological daughter of Franco's younger brother, Ramón Franco, and a prostitute who died after giving birth to her.

On 10 April 1950, in El Pardo, she married Cristóbal Martínez-Bordiú, 10th Marquis of Villaverde. Villaverde was a prominent surgeon. In 1968, he conducted the first heart transplant operation in Spain. The couple had seven children:

- María del Carmen Martínez-Bordiú y Franco, 2nd Duchess of Franco (b. El Pardo, 26 February 1951), who married Prince Alfonso, Duke of Anjou and Cádiz, son of Infante Jaime, Duke of Segovia and grandson of King Alfonso XIII of Spain; and had issue.
- María de la O "Mariola" Martínez-Bordiú y Franco (b. El Pardo, 19 November 1952), married in El Pardo on 14 March 1974 to Rafael Ardid y Villoslada (b. 1 February 1947), and had issue.
- Francisco de Asís Franco y Martínez-Bordiú, 11th Marquis of Villaverde (b. 9 December 1954), married and divorced twice and had issue.
- María del Mar "Merry" Martínez-Bordiú y Franco (b. 6 July 1956), married firstly at the Pazo de Meirás on 3 August 1977 and divorced in 1982, Joaquín José Giménez-Arnau y Puente (b. 14 September 1943), and had issue; married secondly in New York City, New York on 4 August 1986, and divorced in 1991, Gregor Tamler, without issue.
- José Cristóbal Martínez-Bordiú y Franco (b. El Pardo, 10 February 1958), married civilly in New York City, on 23 November 1984 and religiously in Madrid on 27 October 1990 to model Josefina Victoria Toledo y López (b. San José de Tirajana, Canary Islands, 1963), and had issue.
- María de Aránzazu "Arantxa" Martínez-Bordiú y Franco (b. 16 September 1962), married at the Pazo de Meirás on 27 July 1996 to Claudio Quiraga y Ferro, without issue
- Jaime Felipe Martínez-Bordiú y Franco (b. 8 July 1964), married in Madrid on 24 November 1995 to Nuria March y Almela (b. July 1966), divorced and had issue. Married secondly on 7 April 2021 in a civil ceremony in Madrid to Marta Fernández.

Shortly after her father's death in 1975, King Juan Carlos created her Duchess of Franco and a grandee of Spain, with a coat of arms of new creation. The arms are a variation of the arms of the de Andrade family of Galicia, from whom she is twice descended from the Pardo de Andrade branch, and twice again from the 7th counts of Lemos and Sarria.

== Controversies ==
In 1978, she was arrested at Madrid Barajas International Airport for attempting to smuggle 300 million pesetas (>US$4 million) worth of gold, jewellery and medals that had belonged to her father.

Her daughter divorced from her husband and moved to Paris, where she lived with the antiquarian Jean-Marie Rossi, whom she married.

In 2008, she collaborated with Stanley G. Payne and Jesús Palacios Tapias to write Franco, My Father, a biography of her father from her point of view. She described her father as a warm person. With regards to the White Terror, she noted that "he did not talk about it at home". According to the book Franco, referred to as "Generalísimo" or "Head of State", was an "intelligent and moderate", a "brave and Catholic" man and who established an "authoritarian but not totalitarian" regime.

She chaired the Francisco Franco National Foundation, which is under criticism for its revisionist opinions such as calling the Spanish coup of July 1936 an "armed referendum". The Spanish historian Borja de Riquer called that a euphemism with reference to an era in which approximately 140,000 Spaniards were executed in a reign of terror by the Falange, the Guardia Civil and other Nationalist organisations.

During the premiership of José María Aznar the foundation received financial support from the Spanish Minister of Education and Culture. Funding was terminated in 2004.

She is regarded as an icon by the remaining followers of Francoism.

== Death ==
She died from cancer on 29 December 2017 in Madrid, aged 91, and her ashes were buried next to her husband in the crypt of Almudena Cathedral.

== Honours ==
- Spain: Knight Grand Cross of the Order of Beneficence

Spanish nobility
New title	Duchess of Franco; 1975–2017	Succeeded by María del Carmen Martínez-Bordiú y Franco
