= Mancha Real =

- City
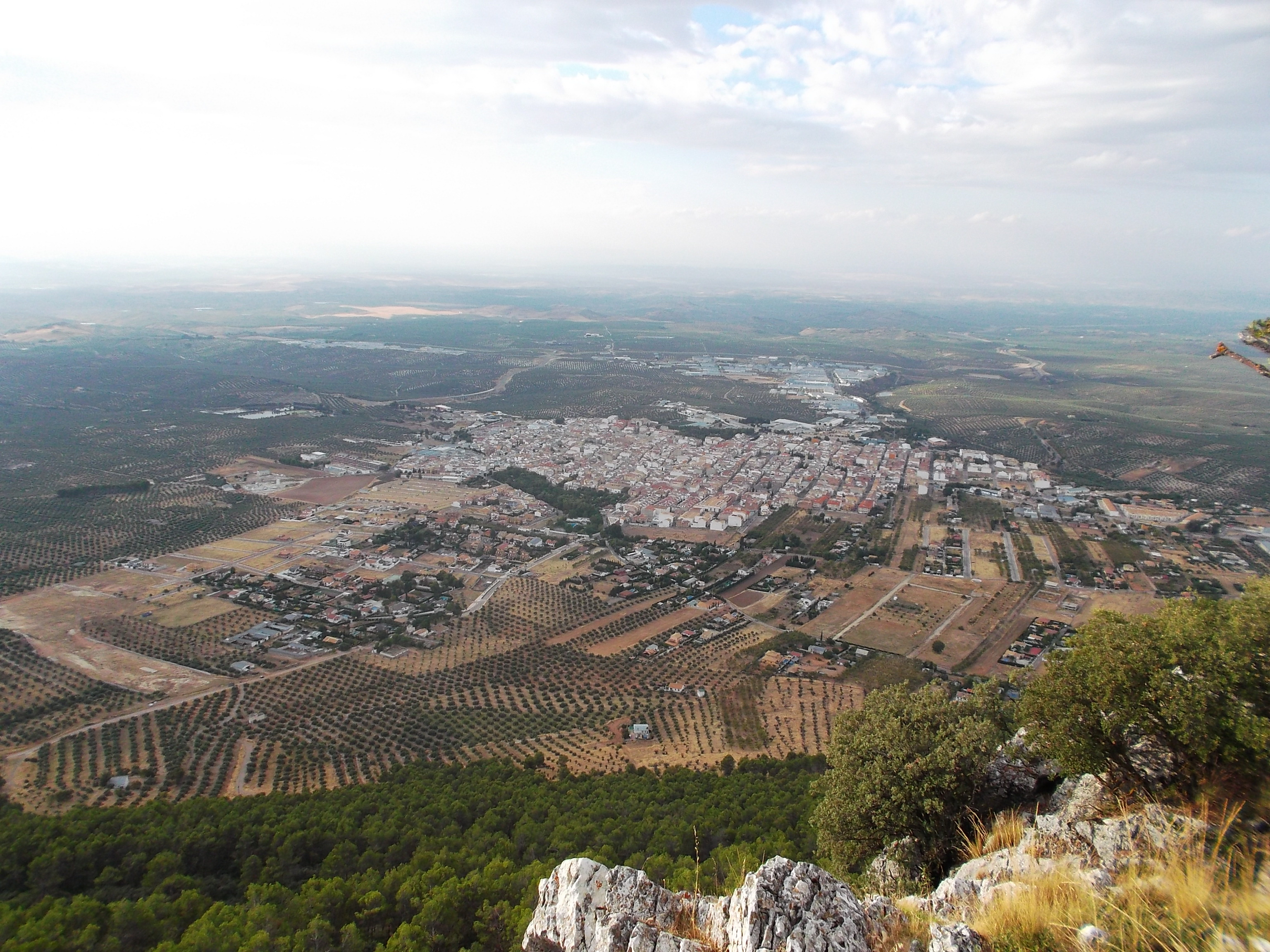

- Flag Coat of arms

- Location in Spain Mancha Real (Andalusia) Mancha Real (Province of Jaén (Spain))
- Coordinates: 37°47′11″N 3°36′45″W
- Country: Spain
- Autonomous community: Andalusia
- Province: Jaén
- Comarca: Metropolitana
- Judicial district: Jaén

Area
  - Total: 97 km^{2} (37 sq mi)
- Elevation: 770 m (2,530 ft)

Population (2025-01-01)
  - Total: 11,481
  - Density: 120/km^{2} (310/sq mi)
- Time zone: UTC+1 (CET)
  - Summer (DST): UTC+2 (CEST)

Mancha Real is a city located in the province of Jaén, Spain. According to the 2020 census (INE), the city has a population of 11,328 inhabitants.

== Notable people ==
- Cristóbal Martínez-Bordiú y Ortega - The son in law of Francisco Franco.

== See also ==
- List of municipalities in Jaén
