= Divine surprise =

French expression

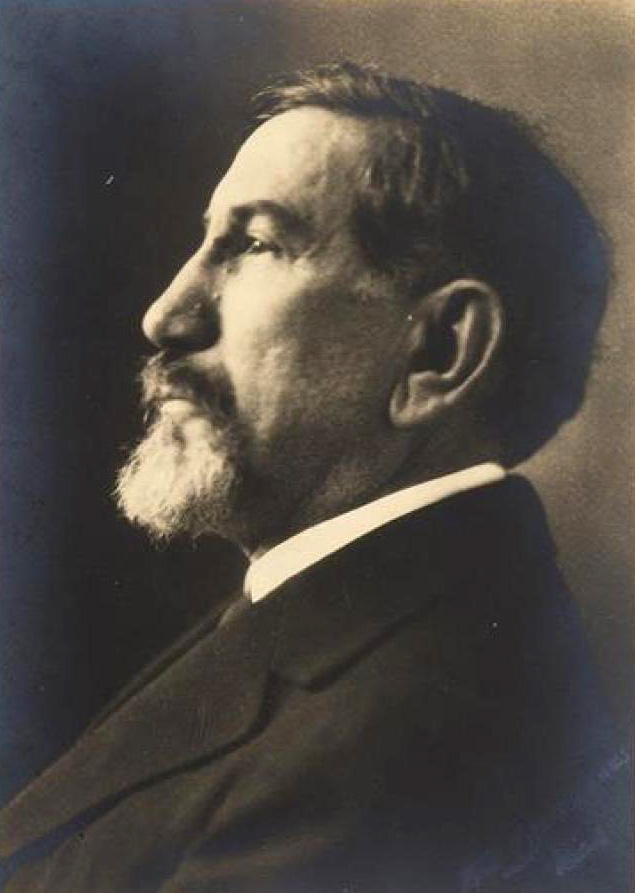
Charles Maurras (1868-1952).

The "divine surprise" is an expression used by the French journalist and politician Charles Maurras, the director of L'Action française. The phrase originally celebrated the rise to power of Marshal Pétain on 11 July 1940. Today, it is mainly used to emphasize the unexpected and striking nature of an event.

== Overview ==
=== Context ===
The vote of full constituent powers to Philippe Pétain took place on 10 July 1940. The following day, Pétain declared himself the head of the French State and assumed full powers. He proclaimed the National Revolution, which Maurras praised as early as July 1940.

The phrase "divine surprise" was first written by Maurras in the weekly Candide on 15 January 1941 and celebrated the rise of Marshal Pétain to the leadership of a state "in which Jews and immigrants would no longer be masters, leaders, or beneficiaries" because of the "suicide" of republican democracy in July 1940. He further elaborated on the phrase in Le Petit Marseillais on 9 February 1941. He referenced it again in April 1941 in an article in L'Action française to clarify its meaning and respond to criticism. Finally, Maurras reiterated the expression in his book De la colère à la justice, published in 1942.

=== Analysis ===
The historian Olivier Dard notes that the phrase "does not refer to the defeat and collapse of the Republic but to 'the man everyone trusted,' Marshal Pétain".

The journalist François Honti confirms that Maurras did not rejoice in France's defeat by Nazi Germany but only commented on "the fact that in their misfortune the French found in Pétain a leader around whom they could rally".

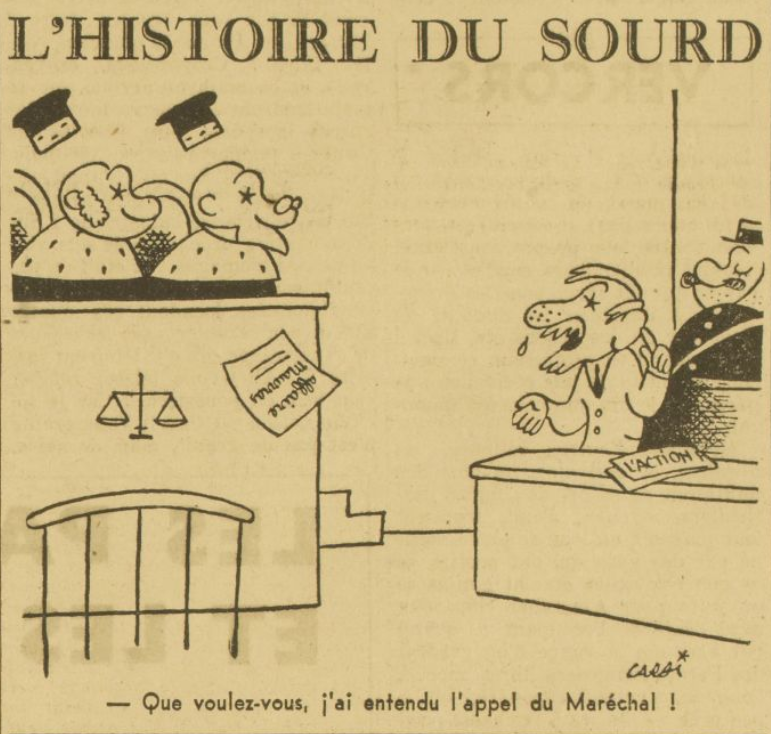
Caricature of Charles Maurras at his trial related to his support for Pétainism in Les Lettres françaises on 20 January 1945.

For the sociologist Julien Damon, Maurras viewed Pétain's rise to power as "a revenge on the Revolution—according to him the greatest misfortune in history, the main cause of the dissolution of social bonds—and on the Republic—according to him responsible for all ills, particularly the defeat of 1940".

== Legacy ==
The phrase is sometimes used in common language to emphasize the unexpected and striking nature of an event. For instance, Mathieu Burgaudeau's third-place finish in the 2023 Tour de France was hailed as a "divine surprise" in La Voix du Nord, as was Markéta Vondroušová's victory at Wimbledon 2023 in L'Équipe.

In 2002, the film critic Pierre Murat used the Maurrasian phrase in a critique of hypermedia and materialism.

During the 2022 French presidential election, the journalist Thomas Legrand used it to describe the emergence of Éric Zemmour's candidacy.

On 4 July 2024, the Indigènes de la République described the riots after Nahel Merzouk's death as a "divine surprise, which puts the racial question back at the center of political debate".
