= María Margarita Vargas Santaella =

Heiress

Marie-Marguerite de Bourbon
- Duchess of Anjou
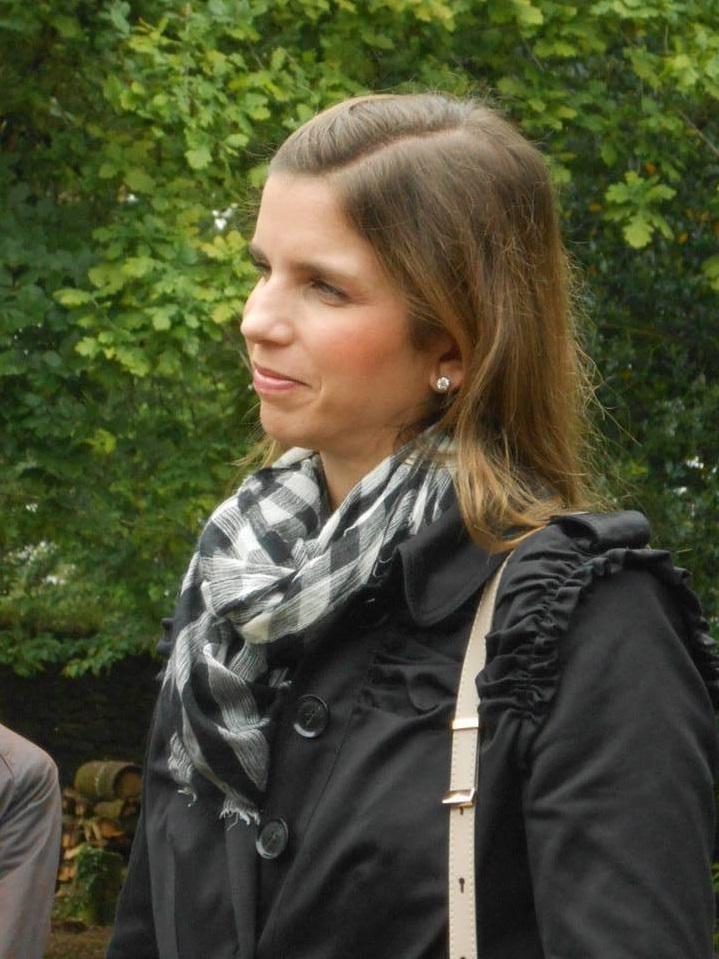
- Marie-Marguerite in Sainte-Anne-d'Auray, 2015

Consort of the Legitimist pretender to the French throne
- Tenure: 6 November 2004 – present
- Born: María Margarita Vargas Santaella; 21 October 1983 (age 43); Caracas, Venezuela
- Spouse: Louis Alphonse de Bourbon (m. 2004)
- Issue: Eugenia de Borbón; Louis; Alphonse; Henri
- Father: Víctor José Vargas Irausquín
- Mother: Carmen Leonor Santaella Tellería

Marie-Marguerite de Bourbon, Duchess of Anjou (née María Margarita Vargas Santaella; born 21 October 1983) is a Venezuelan-born heiress and wife of Louis Alphonse de Bourbon, the Legitimist pretender to the defunct kingdom of France.

== Early life ==
María Margarita Vargas Santaella was born on 21 October 1983 in Caracas. Her father, Víctor José Vargas Irausquín, is the owner of Banco BOD or Banco Occidental de Descuento (BOD Bank or Western Bank of Discount - WBD). Her mother is Carmen Leonor Santaella Tellería. She studied at the Colegio Merici de las Madres Ursulinas in Caracas and did her degree on pedagogy at the Universidad Metropolitana de Caracas.

== Personal life ==
=== Wedding ===
She married Prince Louis Alphonse of Bourbon, Duke of Anjou and Legitimist Pretender to the French throne, in a civil ceremony in Caracas on 6 November 2004 and in a religious ceremony the following day at the Church of St. Stanislaus of Krakovia in La Romana, Dominican Republic.

=== Issue ===
The Duke and Duchess of Anjou are parents to four children:

- Princess Eugénie (Eugénie de Jésus; born on 5 March 2007 in Miami, Florida, United States).
- Prince Louis (born on 28 May 2010 in New York City, United States).
- Prince Alphonse (twin of the above; born on 28 May 2010 in New York City, United States).
- Prince Henri (born on 1 February 2019 in New York City, United States).

They currently live in Madrid, Spain.

Marie-Marguerite obtained French nationality in 2012.

== Bibliography ==
- Cassani Pironti, Fabio. Bref crayon généalogique de S.A.R. la Princesse Marie-Marguerite, Duchesse d'Anjou, née Vargas Santaella, Le Lien Légitimiste, n. 16, 2007.

María Margarita Vargas Santaella Born: 21 October 1983
Titles in pretence
Vacant Title last held by Carmen Martínez-Bordiú	— TITULAR — Queen consort of France; 6 November 2004 – present Reason for succession failure: Bourbons monarchy deposed in 1830	Incumbent
