= Duke of Franco =

Former hereditary title in the Spanish nobility

Dukedom of Franco
- Creation date: 1975
- Created by: Juan Carlos I
- Peerage: Peerage of Spain
- First holder: María del Carmen Franco y Polo, 1st Duchess of Franco
- Last holder: Carmen Martínez Bordiú, 2nd Duchess of Franco
- Status: Abolished
- Extinction date: 2022

Duchess of Franco (Spanish: Duquesa de Franco) was a hereditary title in the Spanish nobility. The title was created in 1975 by King Juan Carlos I and bestowed upon Carmen Franco, the daughter and only child of Spain's Caudillo, General Francisco Franco. Together with the dukedom, she received a coat of arms of new creation. These arms are a variation of the arms of Andrade family of Galicia, from whom Franco was descended through females. A grandeeship was attached to the title.

== History ==
In 1950, Carmen Franco, 1st Duchess of Franco, had married Cristóbal Martínez-Bordiú, 10th Marquess of Villaverde, with whom she had several children. Dukes and duchesses of Franco are also Grandees of Spain. After the death of the 1st Duchess of Franco, succession of the ducal title with accompanying dignity has been requested by her eldest daughter María del Carmen Martínez-Bordiú y Franco. Under Spanish nobiliary law, her eldest daughter Maria is first in line, but does not succeed automatically; with the application to the Crown and the issue of the Royal Letter of Succession, and after an announcement period of thirty days, succession only legally enters into force after a tax is paid.

In 2018, the left-wing Izquierda Unida party sent a letter to King Felipe VI asking that the title of Duke or Duchess of Franco be repressed as a violation of Spain's Historical Memory Law; however, the power to make or unmake nobility resides solely in the Spanish monarch and is not covered by that law. The Dukedom was granted to the heir apparent, María del Carmen Martínez-Bordíu y Franco, the eldest daughter of the late Duchess, on the same year, as published in the Official State Gazette on 4 July 2018.

The title was abolished on 21 October 2022, under the purview of the Law of Democratic Memory.

== Dukes of Franco (1975–2022) ==
- María del Carmen Franco y Polo, 1st Duchess of Franco (1975–2017)
- María del Carmen Martínez-Bordiú y Franco, 2nd Duchess of Franco (2018–2022)

== See also ==
- Lord of Meirás
- List of dukes in the peerage of Spain
