= Duke of Cádiz =

Title in Spanish peerage

Dukedom of Cádiz
- Arms of the Duke of Cádiz (third creation)
- Creation date: 1484
- Creation: First
- Created by: Ferdinand II of Aragon and Isabella I of Castile
- Peerage: Peerage of Spain
- First holder: Rodrigo Ponce de León
- Last holder: Don Alfonso de Borbón y de Dampierre
- Heir apparent: Reverted to the Crown
- Status: Extinct

Duke of Cádiz, named after the city Cádiz in Andalusia, is a substantive title that has been created four times since 1484 for members of the Spanish royal family. It does not include any land tenure and does not produce any income for the holder.

== History ==
Rodrigo Ponce de León was a Castilian military leader who was granted the title of Duke of Cádiz in 1484. After the death of the first duke in 1492, the Catholic Monarchs negotiated with Francisca Ponce de León y de la Fuente regarding the abolition of the Marquisate and Duchy of Cádiz, reinstating the city and the titles to the crown after her death.

For centuries, the title remained in abeyance, until the nineteenth century. Since then, the title was held by members of the Spanish branch of the House of Bourbon.

The title was re-created by the Head of the Spanish State, Francisco Franco, in favor of Alfonso de Borbón, the first-born son of the infante Jacques, Duke of Anjou and Segovia, who received his title by decree for the birth of his son Francois. However, Royal Decree No. 1.368, of November 6, 1987, of King Juan Carlos I made the lifetime title and the predicate of royal highness non-transferable to “spouses [and] children” (transitory provisions). It returned to the Crown on the death of Alfonso de Borbón.

== List of holders ==
	Royal Title	Period
First creation by Ferdinand II of Aragon and Isabella I of Castile
I	Rodrigo Ponce de León	1484–1492
II	Francisca Ponce de León y de la Fuente	1492–1493
Second creation by Ferdinand VII of Spain
I	Infante Francisco de Asís of Spain (6 May 1820 – 15 November 1821)	1820–1821
II	Francisco de Asís, King consort of Spain	1822–1902
Third creation by Francisco Franco
I	Alfonso de Borbón	1972–1989

== Sources ==
- Martina Torres, Juan (2009). The History of Spanish Nobility, 1500–present. Madrid: Universidad Complutense de Madrid (UCM) (translated title)
- Suppression of the Duchy of Cádiz (Spanish)
