= El Pardo =

Coordinates: 40°31′N 3°46′W

- Ward of Madrid
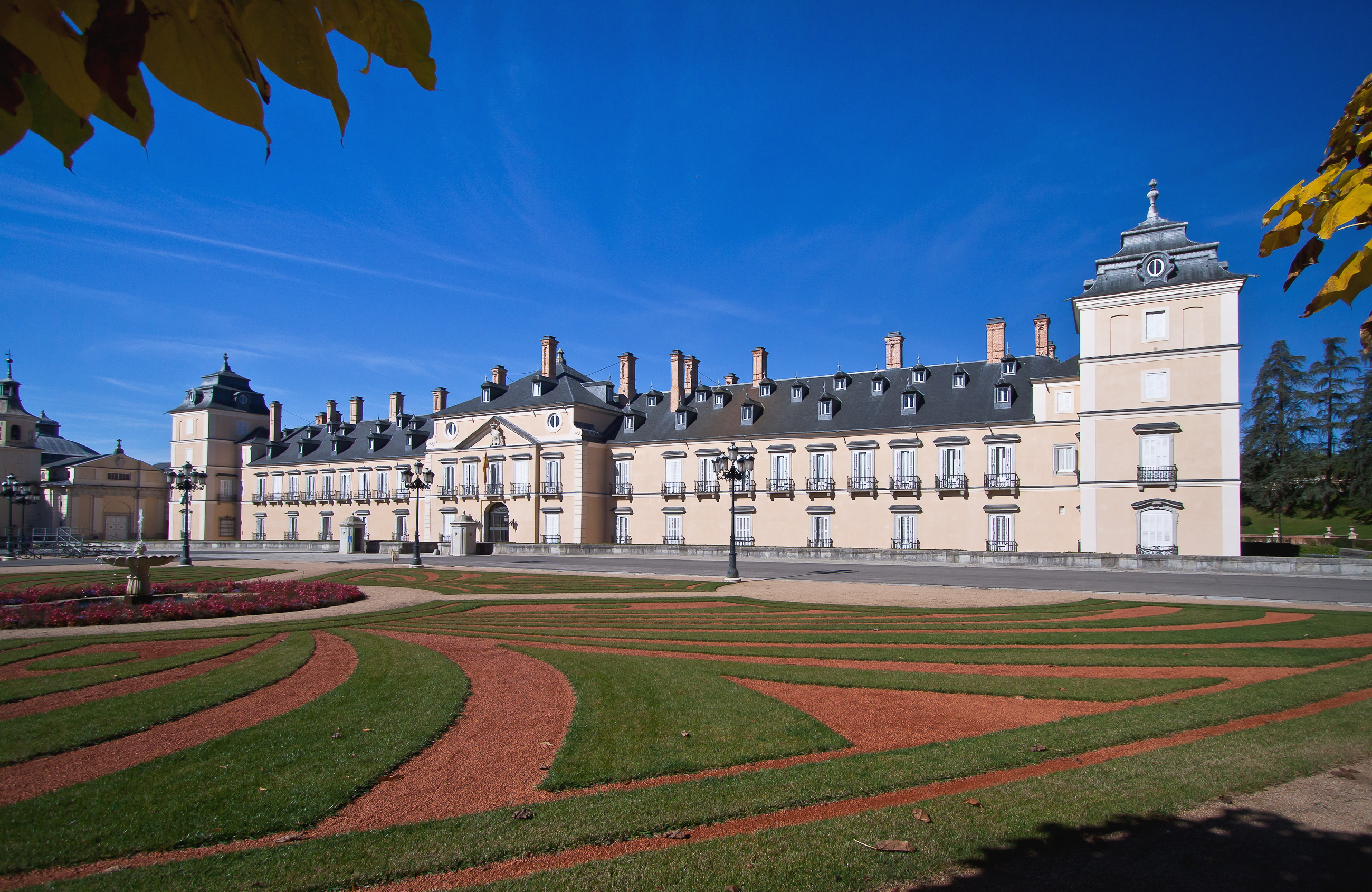
- The Royal Palace of El Pardo

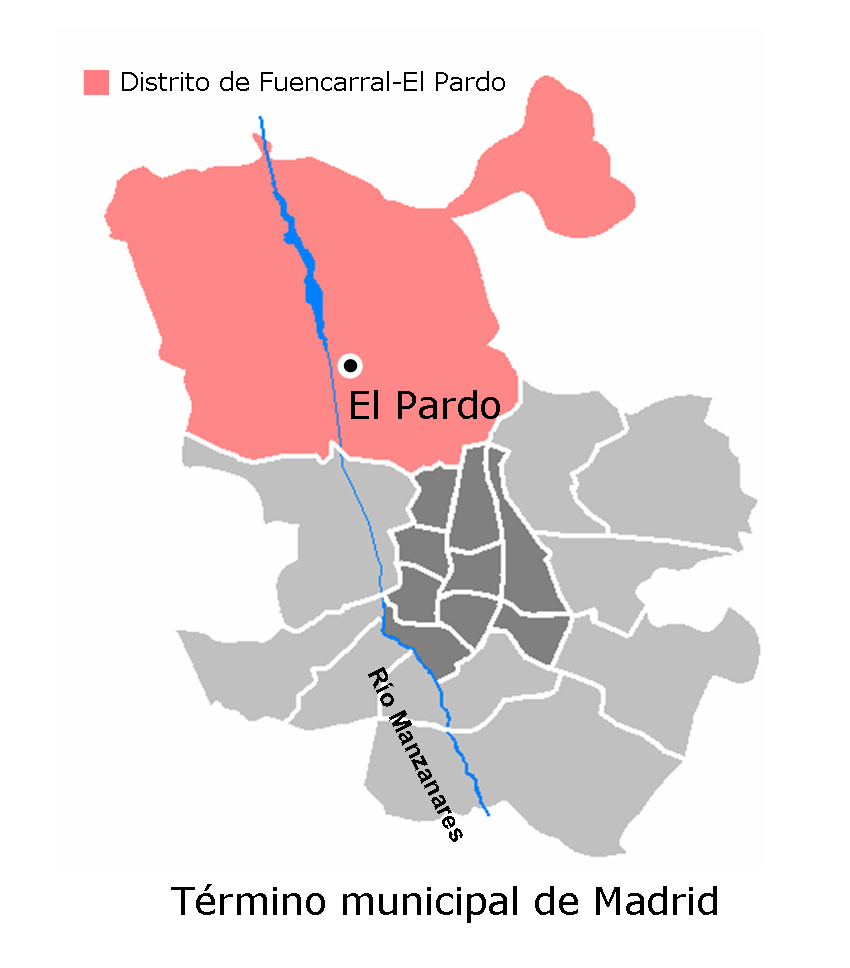
- Country: Spain
- Aut. community: Madrid
- Municipality: Madrid
- District: Fuencarral-El Pardo
- Elevation: 685 m (2,247 ft)

Population
  - Total: 3,657
- Demonym(s): Pardeño, Pardeña
- Postal code: 2 8048

El Pardo is a ward (barrio) of Madrid belonging to the district of Fuencarral-El Pardo. As of 2008 its population was 3,656.

== History ==
The ward was first mentioned in 1405 and in 1950 was an autonomous municipality of the Community of Madrid. One of the most notable buildings is the "Royal Palace of El Pardo", built in 1406 by the order of King Henry III of Castile. It was the first large edifice built in the area.

The Palace of El Pardo was the residence of dictator General Francisco Franco when he was head of the Spanish State.

== Geography ==
El Pardo is located in the northern suburb of Madrid, close to the Manzanares river. Part of its area is covered by a forest named Monte de El Pardo. The ward contains a neighbourhood called Mingorrubio. It has nearly 16,000 hectares and El Pardo's Mount is the most representative Mediterranean forest in the whole region. Also, the enclosure of this Mount is due to Philip VI and took place at the XVIII. Its function was to prevent wild animals from escaping from the royal hunting grounds and to avoid poaching. In fact, much of the enclosure has been maintained to this day.

== Photogallery ==
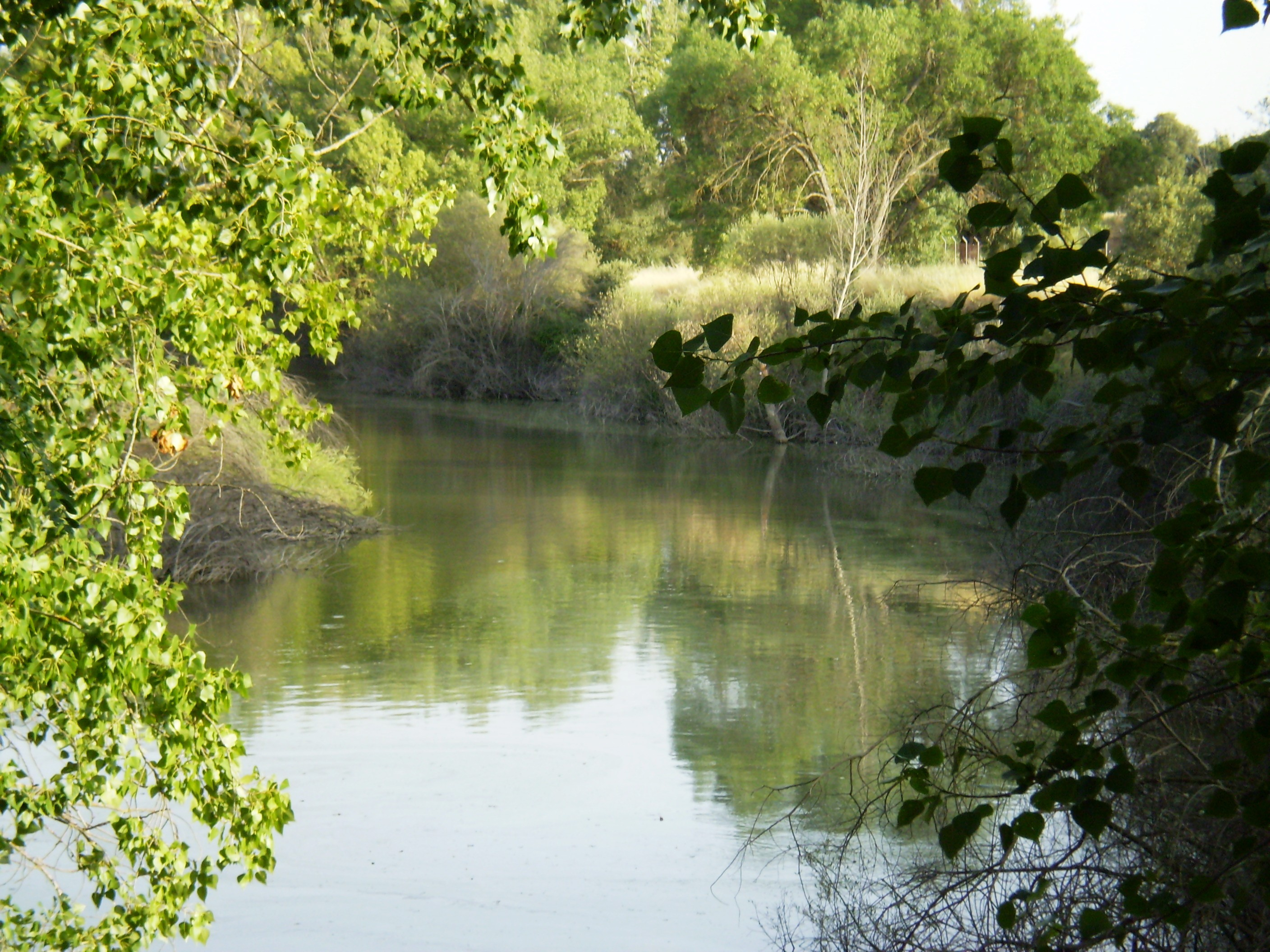
The Manzanares at Monte de El Pardo

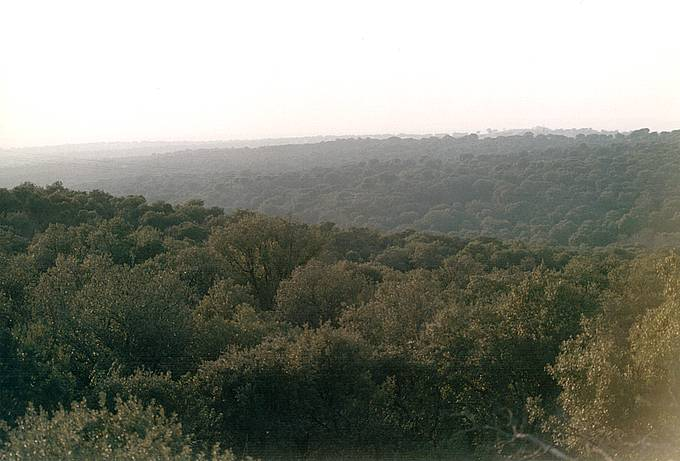
Panoramic view of the Monte de El Pardo

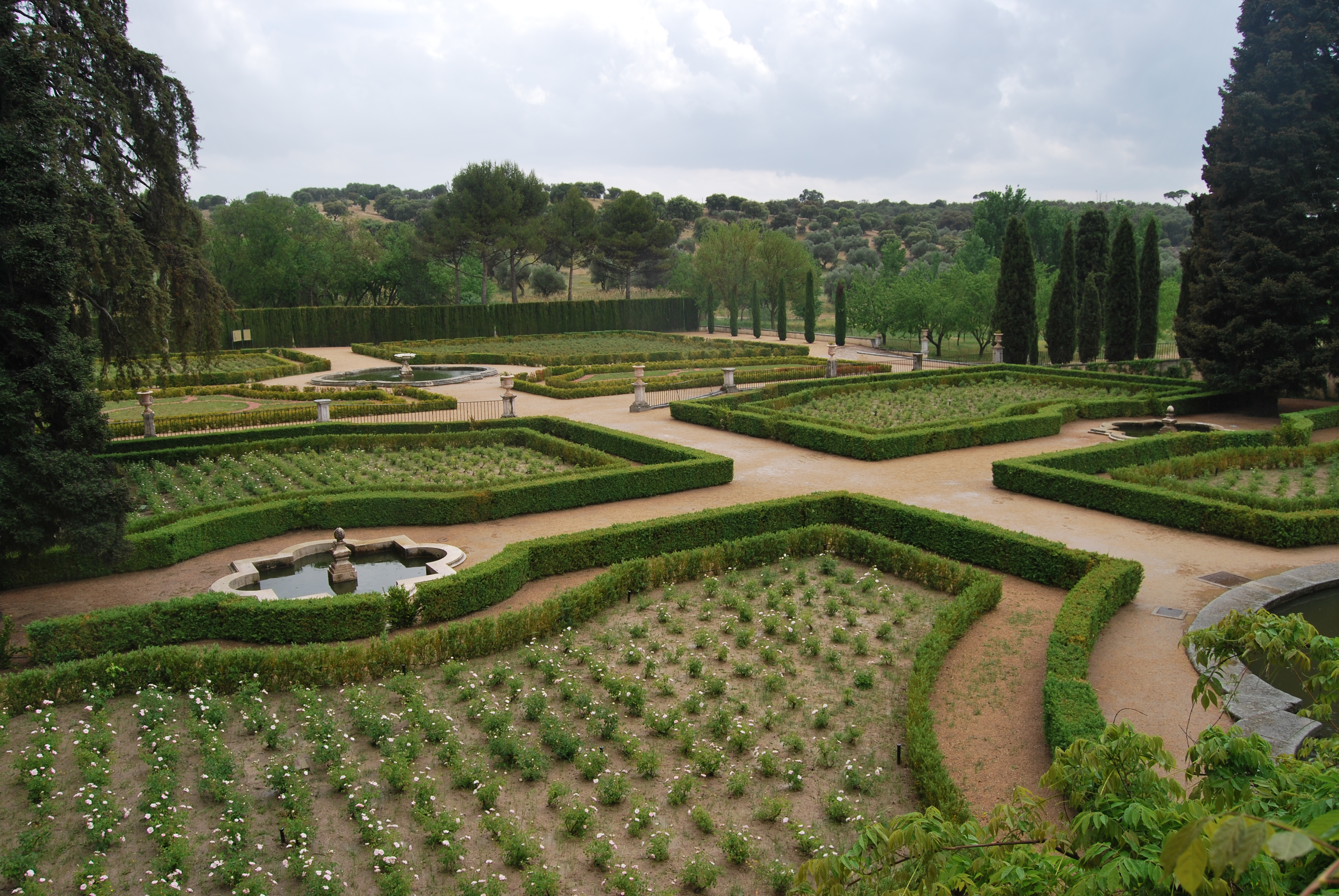
The gardens of the Quinta del Duque del Arco
