= Prince Vittorio Emanuele, Count of Turin =

Count of Turin and a member of the House of Savoy (1870-1946)

Prince Vittorio Emanuele
- Count of Turin
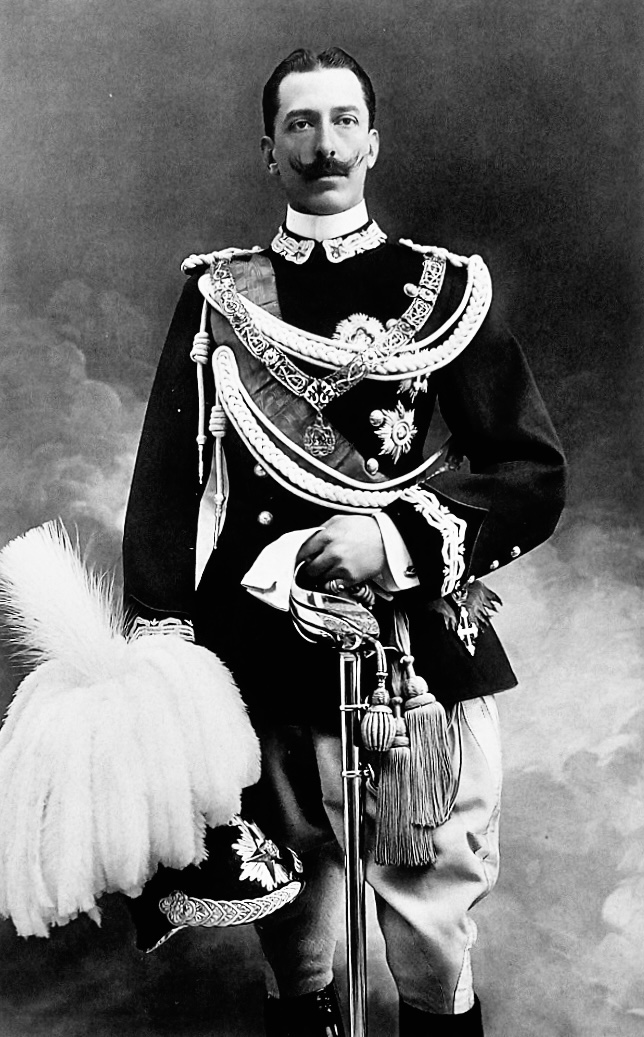
- Vittorio Emanuele in 1895
- Born: 24 November 1870; Turin, Kingdom of Italy
- Died: 10 October 1946 (aged 75); Brussels, Belgium
Names
- Vittorio Emanuele Torino Giovanni Maria di Savoia-Aosta
- House: Savoy
- Father: Amadeo I of Spain
- Mother: Maria Vittoria del Pozzo della Cisterna

Prince Vittorio Emanuele of Savoy-Aosta, Infante of Spain, Count of Turin (24 November 1870 – 10 October 1946) was a grandchild of King Victor Emmanuel II and a member of the House of Savoy. He was a cousin of Victor Emmanuel III.

== Early life ==
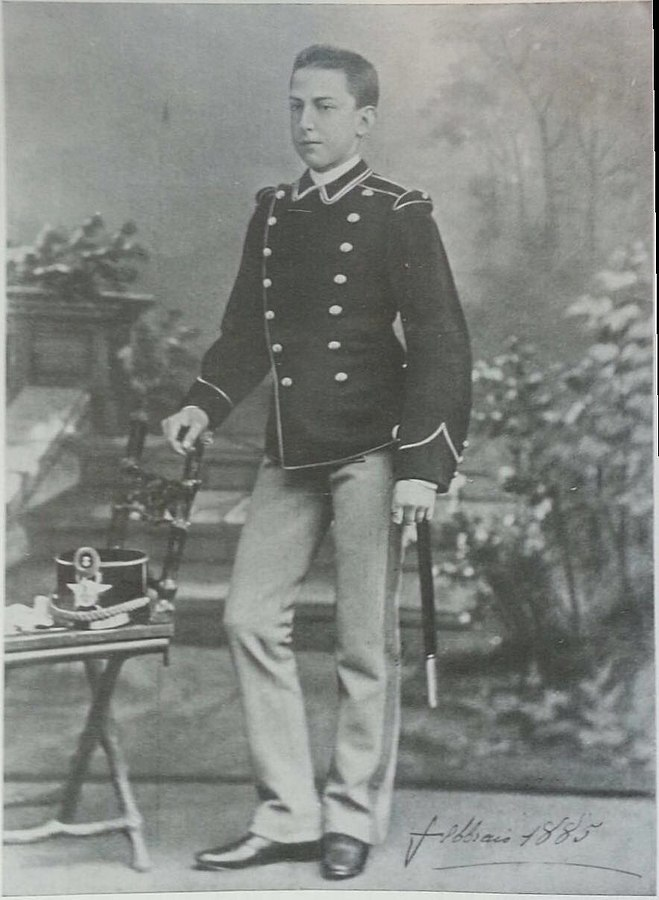
H.R.H. Vittorio Emanuele of Savoy-Aosta, Count of Turin, Cadet in the Military College of Milan in 1885.

Vittorio Emanuele was born in Turin just before his father Prince Amadeo of Savoy, Duke of Aosta was about to leave for Spain where he had been elected king. His mother was Maria Vittoria del Pozzo della Cisterna, the eldest and only surviving child of Carlo Emanuele dal Pozzo, 5th Prince of Cisterna, and of his Belgian wife, Countess Louise de Mérode-Westerloo. With his father's accession to the Spanish throne he gained the additional title Infante of Spain.

== The duel ==
In 1897 Vittorio Emanuele challenged Prince Henri of Orléans to a duel, after Henri described, in several articles in the newspaper Le Figaro, the Italian soldiers being held captive in Ethiopia during the First Italo–Ethiopian War as cowards. The dispute was widely echoed in Italy and Europe. It was agreed on the use of the sword as weapon of choice, as the Italians thought duels with pistols, favored by the French, were worthy of betrayed husbands, not of princes of royal blood.

The duel with swords, directed by the Count Leontiev and the Count Avogadro, lasting 26 minutes, took place at 5:00 am on 15 August 1897 in the Bois de Marechaux at Vaucresson, France. Vittorio Emanuele defeated Henri after five reprises. Henri received a serious wound to his right abdomen, and the doctors of both parties considered the injury serious enough to put him in a state of obvious inferiority, causing the end of the duel and making Vittorio Emanuele famous in Europe.

The public response for Vittorio Emanuele in Italy was triumphant. In Turin King Umberto I welcomed him saying, "I want to be the first to congratulate you with all my heart on the example you set and the success you scored".

== Later years ==
In April 1898 Vittorio Emanuele set out on a tour of world. His first stop was New York City in the United States of America. After spending a day at the Newport Country Club he presented the club with a silver cup which is presented to the winner of the annual Count of Turin golf tournament. After his stay in the United States he visited China and Japan on the next leg of his world tour.

Vittorio Emanuele pursued a career in the Royal Italian Army and became the Commander in Chief of the Italian Cavalry. He held this position during the First World War. Following the armistice he was awarded the Croix de guerre by France.

In 1913, The Count was among various candidates proposed for the throne of the newly independent Albania.

== Death ==
Vittorio Emanuele died in Brussels four months after the proclamation of the Italian Republic. He was the last surviving son of Amedeo I. His body was buried, until 1968, in the Merode-mausoleum in Everberg, Belgium. Aftrwards, his grave was transferred to the Basilica di Superga in Turin, Italy.

== Ancestry ==
Ancestors of Prince Vittorio Emanuele, Count of Turin

8. Charles Albert of Sardinia
4. Victor Emmanuel II of Italy
9. Archduchess Maria Theresa of Austria
2. Amadeo I of Spain
10. Archduke Rainer Joseph of Austria
5. Archduchess Adelaide of Austria
11. Princess Elisabeth of Savoy
1. Prince Vittorio Emanuele, Count of Turin
12. Giuseppe Alfonso dal Pozzo, Principe della Cisterna
6. Carlo Emanuele dal Pozzo, Principe della Cisterna
13. Maria Anna Balbo Bertone dei Conti di Sambuy
3. Maria Vittoria dal Pozzo, Principessa della Cisterna
14. Count Werner de Mérode-Westerloo
7. Countess Louise de Mérode-Westerloo
15. Countess Victoire van Spangen d'Uyternesse

== Honours and awards ==
- Knight of the Supreme Order of the Most Holy Annunciation (14 March 1892)
- Knight Grand Cross of the Order of Saints Maurice and Lazarus
- Grand Officer of the Military Order of Savoy
- Knight Grand Cross of the Order of the Crown of Italy
- Knight of the Civil Order of Savoy
- Knight of Honour and Devotion of the Sovereign Military Hospitaller Order of Malta
- Croix de guerre 1914–1918 (France)
- Knight of the Order of the Black Eagle (6 May 1896) (German Empire)
- Knight of the Most Illustrious Order of the Royal House of Chakri (Thailand)
- Grand Cross of the Order of Carol I (Romania)
