= Carlo Emanuele dal Pozzo della Cisterna =

Italian politician

Carlo Emanuele dal Pozzo
- 5th Prince of La Cisterna
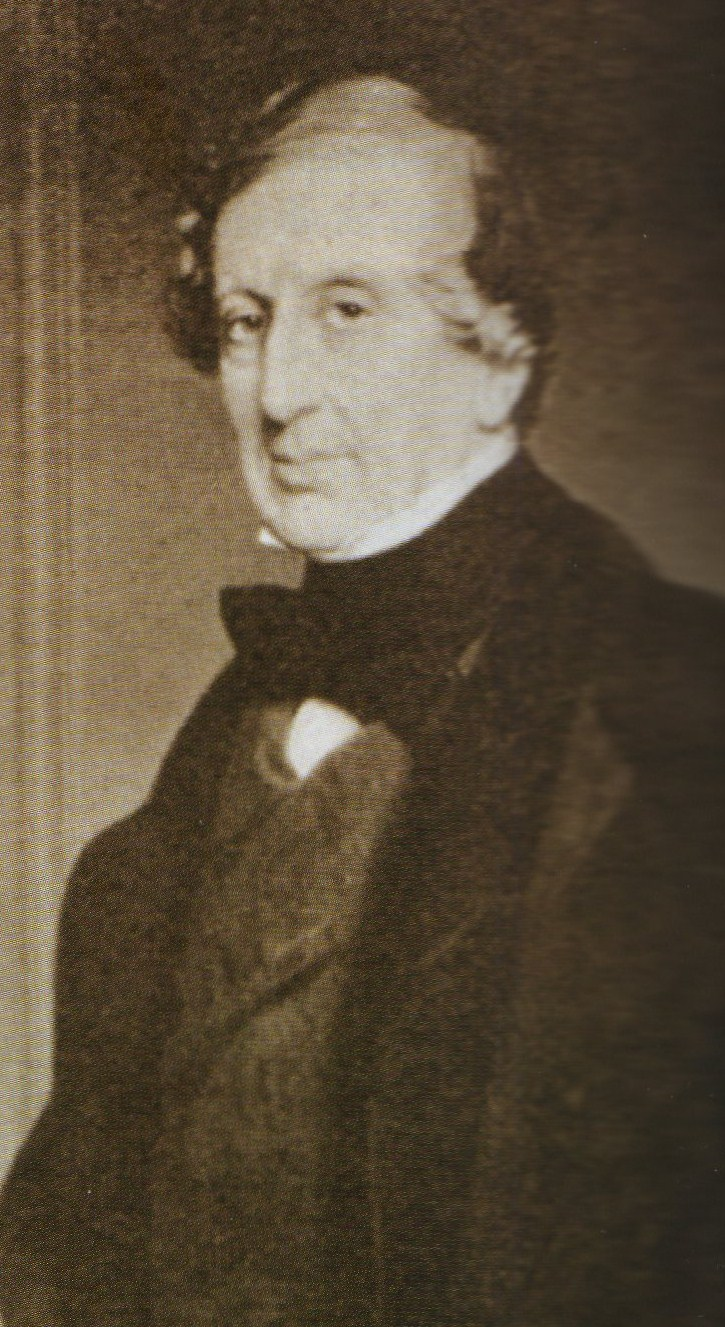

Prince of La Cisterna
- Tenure: 31 March 1819 – 26 March 1864
- Predecessor: Giuseppe Alfonso dal Pozzo
- Successor: Princess Maria Vittoria
- Full name: Carlo Emanuele Filippo Giuseppe Alfonso Francesco Maria
- Born: 7 January 1787; Turin, Duchy of Savoy (now Piedmont), Kingdom of Sardinia
- Died: 26 March 1864 (aged 77); Turin, Province of Turin, Kingdom of Italy (now Republic of Italy)
- Buried: Chapel of Madonna of Pietà, Reano
- Noble family: Pozzo
- Spouse: Countess Louise de Mérode-Westerloo (m. 1846)
- Issue: Maria Vittoria, Queen of Spain; Princess Beatrice Giuseppa dal Pozzo
- Father: Giuseppe Alfonso dal Pozzo, 4th Principe della Cisterna
- Mother: Maria Anna Balbo Bertone

Carlo Emanuele dal Pozzo, 5th Prince of La Cisterna (7 January 1787 in Turin – 26 March 1864 in Turin) was a nobleman and politician in the Kingdom of Sardinia. His other titles were 5th Principe di Belriguardo, 6th Marchese di Voghera, 6th Conte di Reano, 8th Conte di Ponderano, 8th Conte di Bonvicino, 6th Conte di Neive, 6th Conte di Perno, among others.

== Career ==
The prince was a liberal, and he conspired in his youth against King Victor Emmanuel I of Sardinia in favour of a constitutional monarchy. This attempt failed, and he was forced into exile in France, where he continued promoting the Risorgimento. In 1848, he was allowed to return to Italy, and he became a senator of Sardinia.

He was made a baron of the French Empire in 1810 and became chamberlain in the same year to Camillo Borghese, Duke of Guastalla.

== Personal life ==
In Brussels on 28 September 1846, he married Countess Louise de Merode-Westerloo, daughter of Count Werner de Merode (of the princely house of Rubempré) by his wife, Countess Victoire de Spangen d'Uyternesse. The couple had two daughters:

1. Princess Maria Vittoria dal Pozzo (1847–1876), married Prince Amedeo of Savoy, Duke of Aosta (second son of King Victor Emmanuel II of Italy), who briefly occupied the Spanish throne from 1870 to 1873. After the death of Carlo Emanuele, Maria Vittoria inherited her father's titles, which passed through her to the Aosta cadet branch of the House of Savoy.
2. Princess Beatrice Giuseppa Antonia Luisa dal Pozzo (1851–1864), died during childhood. Buried at Chapel of Madonna of Pietà, Reano.

== Ancestry ==
Ancestors of Carlo Emanuele dal Pozzo della Cisterna

16. Amedeo dal Pozzo, 2nd Principe della Cisterna e Belriguardo
8. Alfonso dal Pozzo, 3rd Principe della Cisterna e Belriguardo
17. Marie Henriette Le Hardy, dame de La Trousse
4. Giuseppe dal Pozzo, Principe della Cisterna e Belriguardo
18. Ercole Roero, Marchese di Cortanze
9. Barbara Roero dei marchesi di Cortanze
19. Ludovica Roero di Settime dei conti di Mombarone
2. Giuseppe dal Pozzo, 4th Principe della Cisterna e Belriguardo
20. Giuseppe Caresana, 3rd Count di Carisio
10. Pietro Caresana, 4th Count di Carisio
21. Maria Amedea Malabaila dei conti di Canale
5. Anna Caresana dei conti di Carisio
22. Giovanni Doria, Marchese di Cirié
11. Luigia Doria dei marchesi di Cirié
23. Cristina d'Este dei marchesi di Dronero
1. Carlo Emanuele dal Pozzo, 5th Principe della Cisterna e Belriguardo
24. Giovanni Balbo, signore di Sambuy
12. Giulio Balbo Bertone, signore di Sambuy
25. Lucrezia Tana di Santena
6. Carlo Balbo Bertone, Count di Sambuy
26. Carlo di Saluzzo, Count di Verzuolo
13. Beatrice di Saluzzo dei conti di Verzuolo
27. Cristina Biandrate dei marchesi di San Giorgio
3. Maria Anna Balbo Bertone dei conti di Sambuy
28. Ghiron Asinari, Marchese di San Marzano
14. Filippo Asinari, Marchese di San Marzano
29. Maria Margherita Alfieri dei marchesi di Magliano
7. Rosalia Asinari dei marchesi di San Marzano
30. Vittorio Ferrero-Fieschi, Prince of Masserano
15. Maria Luisa Ferrero-Fieschi dei principi di Masserano
31. Giovanna Irene Caracciolo dei principi di Santo Buono

Carlo Emanuele dal Pozzo della Cisterna Pozzo Family Born: 7 January 1787 Died: 26 March 1864
Italian nobility
Preceded by Giuseppe Alfonso dal Pozzo	Prince of La Cisterna; 31 March 1819 – 26 March 1864	Succeeded by Princess Maria Vittoria, Duchess of Aosta
