= Louise de Mérode =

Princess Louise
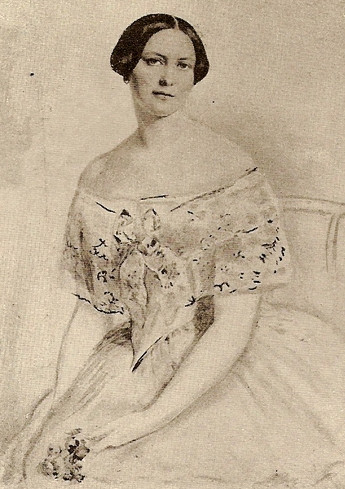

Princess of La Cisterna
- Period: 28 September 1846 – 26 March 1864
- Full name: Louise Caroline Ghislaine de Mérode-Westerloo
- Born: 22 May 1819; Brussels, United Kingdom of the Netherlands
- Died: 1 March 1868 (aged 48); Cisterna Palace, Turin, Province of Turin, Kingdom of Italy
- Buried: Chapel of Madonna of Pietà, Reano
- Noble family: Mérode-Westerloo
- Spouse: Prince Carlo Emmanuele dal Pozzo, 5th Prince of Cisterna (m. 1846; died 1864)
- Issue: Princess Maria Vittoria, Duchess of Aosta; Princess Beatrice Giuseppa dal Pozzo
- Father: Count Werner de Mérode-Westerloo
- Mother: Countess Victoire van Spangen d'Uyternesse

Countess Louise de Mérode (Louise Caroline Ghislaine de Merode-Westerloo; 22 May 1819 – 1 March 1868) was a member of the House of Merode by birth and Princess della Cisterna by marriage.

== Life and family ==
Born in Brussels, she was the eldest of seven children born to Count Werner de Merode and Countess Victoire van Spangen d'Uyternesse . Her younger sister, Antoinette de Merode, was the future wife of Charles III, Prince of Monaco.

On 28 September 1846 at Brussels, she married Carlo Emanuele dal Pozzo, 5th Prince della Cisterna, an Italian nobleman from one of the few aristocratic families in the Kingdom of Sardinia to bear the title of "prince" as a noble title. It was a double wedding with her younger sister, Antoinette. Carlo Emanuele dal Pozzo had been exiled from Sardinia in 1821 after having conspired against King Vittorio Emanuele I, but the couple returned to Turin in 1848.

In 1867, her daughter Maria married Prince Amadeo of Savoy, The Duke of Aosta, second son of King Victor Emmanuel II of Italy and his wife Archduchess Adelaide of Austria. Prince Amadeo briefly occupied the Spanish throne from 1870 to 1873.

Upon the death of Louise's husband in 1864, their daughter Maria inherited his titles and properties, eventually passing them on to her son. In 1868, Louise died at the Palazzo dal Pozzo della Cisterna in Turin.

== Issue ==
- Princess Maria Vittoria dal Pozzo (1847–1876); married Prince Amedeo of Savoy, 1st Duke of Aosta; After the death of Carlo Emanuele, Maria Vittoria inherited her father's titles, which passed through her to the Aosta cadet branch of the House of Savoy.
- Princess Beatrice Giuseppa Antonia Luisa dal Pozzo (1851–1864); died during childhood. Buried at Chapel of Madonna of Pietà, Reano.

== Ancestry ==
Ancestors of Louise de Mérode

8. Philippe-Maximilien, Count de Merode, Marquis van Westerloo
4. Guillaume, Count de Merode, Prince de Rubempré
9. Marie Catherine de Merode, Princess de Rubempré
2. Count Werner de Merode
10. Othon-Henri d'Ongnies, Count de Mastaing, Prince van Grimberghe
5. Marie d'Ongnies, Princess van Grimberghe
11. Marie de Merode
1. Countess Louise de Merode
12. Count Charles van Spangen van Uyternesse
6. Count François van Spangen van Uyternesse
13. Marie Anne Françoise Josephe de Croix
3. Countess Victoire van Spangen van Uyternesse
14. Jacques Albert de Flaveau, Baron de Loverval
7. Louise Xaviere Albertine de Flaveau
15. Ernestine Henriette de Cassal de Ny

Louise de Mérode Mérode-Westerloo Family Cadet branch of the House of Mérode Born: 22 May 1819 Died: 1 March 1868
Italian nobility
Vacant Title last held by Maria Anna Balbo Bertone di Sambuy	Princess of La Cisterna; 28 September 1846 - 26 March 1864	Vacant Title next held by Prince Amadeo, Duke of Aosta as Prince
