= Maria Vittoria dal Pozzo =

Queen consort of Spain from 1870 to 1873

- 6th Princess of Cisterna d'Asti and of Belriguardo
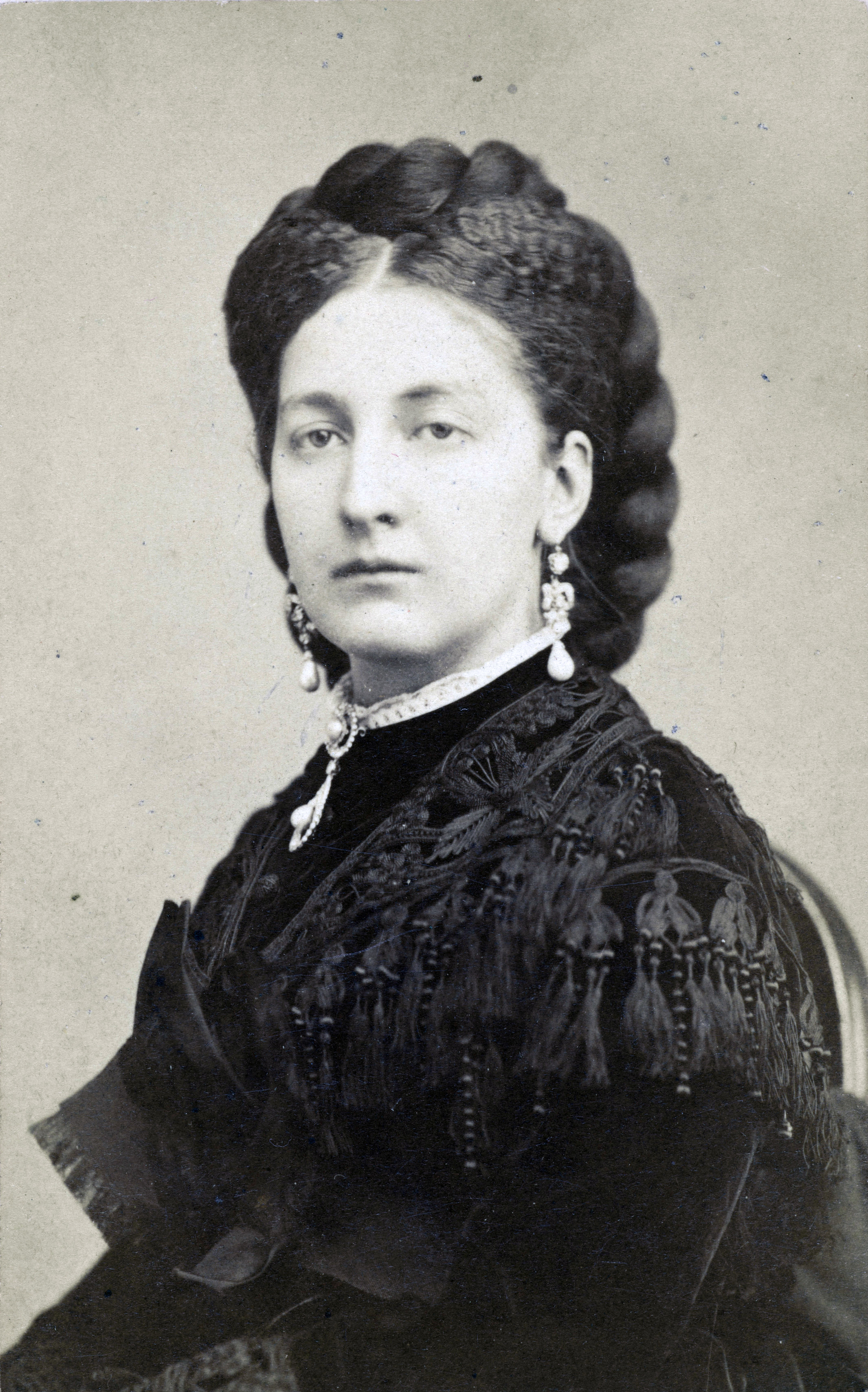
- Maria Vittoria, c. 1870

Queen consort of Spain
- Tenure: 16 November 1870 – 11 February 1873

6th Princess of Cisterna d'Asti and of Belriguardo
- Tenure: 26 March 1864 – 8 November 1876
- Predecessor: Carlo Emanuele dal Pozzo
- Successor: Prince Emanuele Filiberto of Savoy
- Born: Maria Vittoria Carlotta Enrichetta Giovanna dal Pozzo; 9 August 1847; Paris, France
- Died: 8 November 1876 (aged 29); Sanremo, Italy
- Burial: Basilica of Superga
- Spouse: Amadeo I of Spain (m. 1867)
- Issue: Prince Emanuele Filiberto, Duke of Aosta; Prince Vittorio Emanuele, Count of Turin; Prince Luigi Amedeo, Duke of the Abruzzi
- Noble family: Pozzo
- Father: Carlo Emanuele dal Pozzo
- Mother: Louise de Mérode

Maria Vittoria Carlotta Enrichetta Giovanna dal Pozzo, 6th Princess of Cisterna d'Asti and of Belriguardo (9 August 1847 – 8 November 1876), was an Italian noblewoman who was Queen of Spain from 16 November 1870 until 11 February 1873 as the wife of King Amadeo I. Maria Vittoria inherited her princely title after the death of her father. In 1867, she married Amadeo, then Duke of Aosta, second son of King Victor Emmanuel II of Italy. In 1870, her husband became the king of Spain, making her queen consort. King Amadeo abdicated after a reign of less than three years, and he and Maria Vittoria returned to Italy. She died in Sanremo, Italy, in 1876.

== Early life ==
She was the eldest and only surviving child of Carlo Emanuele dal Pozzo della Cisterna, 5th Prince of Cisterna d'Asti and of Belriguardo, and his wife, Countess Louise de Mérode-Westerloo. Upon the death of her father in 1864, she inherited his noble titles and thus became the Princess of Cisterna d'Asti and of Belriguardo, Marquise of Voghera and Countess of Ponderano, among other titles, in her own right.

== Marriage ==
On 30 May 1867 in Turin, she married Prince Amadeo of Savoy, the Duke of Aosta and second son of King Victor Emmanuel II of Italy. An urban legend grew and circulates that claims numerous tragedies to have befallen the wedding of Maria Vittoria and the Duke of Aosta; an early source recounts the death of a stationmaster under the bridal party's train.

Her husband was elected to occupy the vacant Spanish throne on 16 November 1870. She lived a discreet life in Spain and only involved herself in charity. Amadeo resigned from his position on 11 February 1873, and he and Maria Vittoria returned to Italy. Her health was damaged by the trip and childbirth, and she died later that year of tuberculosis in Sanremo.

== Issue ==
1. Prince Emanuele Filiberto of Savoy-Aosta, Duke of Aosta (13 January 1869 – 4 July 1931), Marshal of Italy, married to Princess Hélène of Orléans and had issue.
2. Prince Vittorio Emanuele of Savoy-Aosta, Count of Turin (24 November 1870 – 10 October 1946), died unmarried.
3. Prince Luigi Amedeo of Savoy-Aosta, Duke of the Abruzzi (29 January 1873 – 18 March 1933), Vice Admiral in the Italian Royal Navy, died unmarried.

== Honours ==
- Kingdom of Italy : Dame Grand Cross of the Order of Saints Maurice and Lazarus.
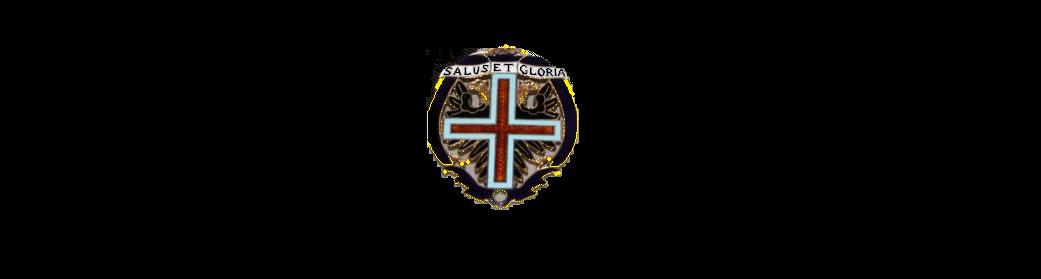
- Austria-Hungary : Dame of the Order of the Starry Cross.

== Ancestry ==
Ancestors of Maria Vittoria dal Pozzo

8. Giuseppe dal Pozzo della Cisterna, 3º Principe di Cisterna d'Asti e di Belriguardo
4. Giuseppe Alfonso dal Pozzo della Cisterna, 4º Principe di Cisterna d'Asti e di Belriguardo
9. Anna Caresana dei Conti di Carisio
2. Carlo Emanuele dal Pozzo della Cisterna, 5º Principe di Cisterna d'Asti e di Belriguardo
10. Carlo Balbo Bertone, Conte di Sambuy
5. Maria Anna Balbo Bertone dei Conti di Sambuy
11. Rosalia Asinari dei Marchesi di San Marzano
1. Maria Vittoria dal Pozzo
12. Count Guillaume-Charles de Mérode-Westerloo
6. Count Werner de Mérode-Westerloo
13. Marie Joséphine d'Ongnies
3. Countess Louise de Mérode-Westerloo
14. Count François van Spangen d'Uyternesse
7. Countess Victoire van Spangen d'Uyternesse
15. Louise de Flaveau

Maria Vittoria dal Pozzo Pozzo family Born: 9 August 1847 Died: 8 November 1876
Royal titles
Vacant Title last held by Francisco de Asís, Duke of Cádiz as king consort	Queen consort of Spain; 16 November 1870 – 11 February 1873	Vacant Republic declared Title next held by Mercedes of Orléans
Italian royalty
Vacant Title last held by Archduchess Maria Theresa of Austria-Este	Duchess of Aosta; 2nd Creation; 30 May 1867 – 8 November 1876	Vacant Title next held by Princess Maria Letizia Bonaparte
Italian nobility
Preceded by Carlo Emanuele dal Pozzo della Cisterna	6th Princess of Cisterna d'Asti and of Belriguardo; 26 March 1864 – 8 November 1876	Succeeded by Prince Emanuele Filiberto of Savoy-Aosta
