= Scuola Militare Teulié =

Coordinates: 45.4539°N 9.1869°E

Scuola Militare "Teulié"
- Country: Kingdom of Italy Italian Republic
- Allegiance: NATO
- Branch: Royal Italian Army; Italian Army
- Type: Military School
- Role: Secondary school: Liceo scientifico, Liceo Classico
- Size: 180 cadets
- Garrison/HQ: Milan, Corso Italia, 58
- Nickname: “Military School of the first Tricolour”
- Mottos: Iterum alte volat (from Latin: Flying high again)
- Engagements: Five Days of Milan
- Decorations: Army Bronze Medal for Military Valour
- Website: http://www.esercito.difesa.it

Commanders
- Current commander: col. Gianluigi D'Ambrosio

The Scuola Militare "Teulié" (Military School Teulié) is a highly selective military school of the Italian Army and, founded in 1802, is one of the oldest military academies in the world. The school is located in the city of Milan in a historical building. The motto of the school is Iterum alte volat, which means Flying high again.

== History ==
The history of the school is diverse and complex. The building that currently hosts the school was built in the Middle Ages as the Hospital of Saint Celso. Later, in 1758 it became the Cistercian monastery of Saint Luke and was used as a military hospital first and then, at the hands of Pietro Teulié, as a military orphanage. With the advent of the Napoleonic Italian Kingdom, the orphanage's name was changed to Royal College of the Military Orphans. In 1839 the Austrian Emperor Ferdinand I, converted the orphanage to the Imperial college of cadets. In 1848 the cadets took part in the Five Days of Milan, after which the building hosted the Royal school of artillery.

With the return of the Austrians the school was not reopened to punish the insurgents of the Five Days of Milan and it was instead turned into a military hospital.

The college will open in 1859 as the Military College of Milan and closed again in 1869 due to financial difficulties. The school, however, opens in 1873 thanks to the new Army regulations, approved that year, but in 1894 is forced to close again.

During World War I the building is used as a military barrack but in 1935 the Fascist government founds the Military School of Milan which will close with the Badoglio Proclamation in 1943.

In the following 53 years the building was used as headquarters of the III Corps of the Italian army, until 1996 when the school was reopened as a branch of the Nunziatella military school. The school became independent in 1998 and was first designated second military school of the Army and ultimately Military School "Teulié".

== Notable ex cadets ==
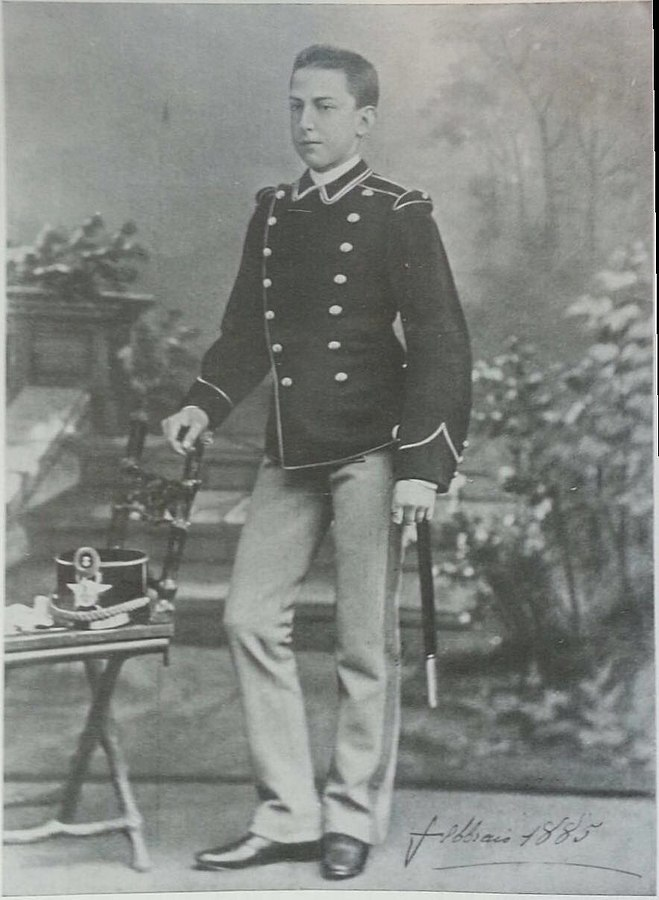
H.R.H. Vittorio Emanuele of Savoy-Aosta, Count of Turin, Cadet in the Military College of Milan in 1885.

- H.R.H. Prince Vittorio Emanuele, Count of Turin
- Luigi Cadorna
- Emilio De Bono
- Enrico Forlanini
- Carlo Di Rudio
- Giorgio Paglia
- Adolfo Serafino
- Ettore Ruocco
- Renato Del Din
- Aldo Zamorani
- Enrico Caviglia
- Vittorio Santini

== Education of cadets ==
=== Academic activities ===
The military school "Teulié" follows the regulations of the Italian Ministry of Education, Universities and Research for the Liceo Scientifico and Liceo Classico. During their high school's years the students also follow specific classes about military history and military tactics.

=== Sport activities ===
The cadets normally practice two of the following sports:

- Swimming
- Equestrianism
- Volleyball
- Judo
- Rowing
- Fencing
- Track and field
- Basketball
- Karate

=== Military activities ===
The young cadets have to take part in military drills as well as studying and practice sports. The military drills include

- Military formal training
- Basic combat training
- Shooting training
- Air assault basic training
- Close combat training
- First aid

Most of the training is carried out during the summer months in the training facilities of the Army.

=== Academy lifestyle ===
Since the military school "Teulié" is essentially a military barrack, like every other military academy it has a strict code of behaviour that has to be followed. If the cadets have not been punished for breaking the code of behaviour, they are allowed to go out for half a day on Wednesday and Saturday, and for the whole day on Sunday, at the times defined by the company commander. Furthermore, if the conditions persist, the cadets are allowed to sleep outside of the school on Saturday night.
