= Amadeo I of Spain =

King of Spain from 1870 to 1873

Amadeo I
- Duke of Aosta
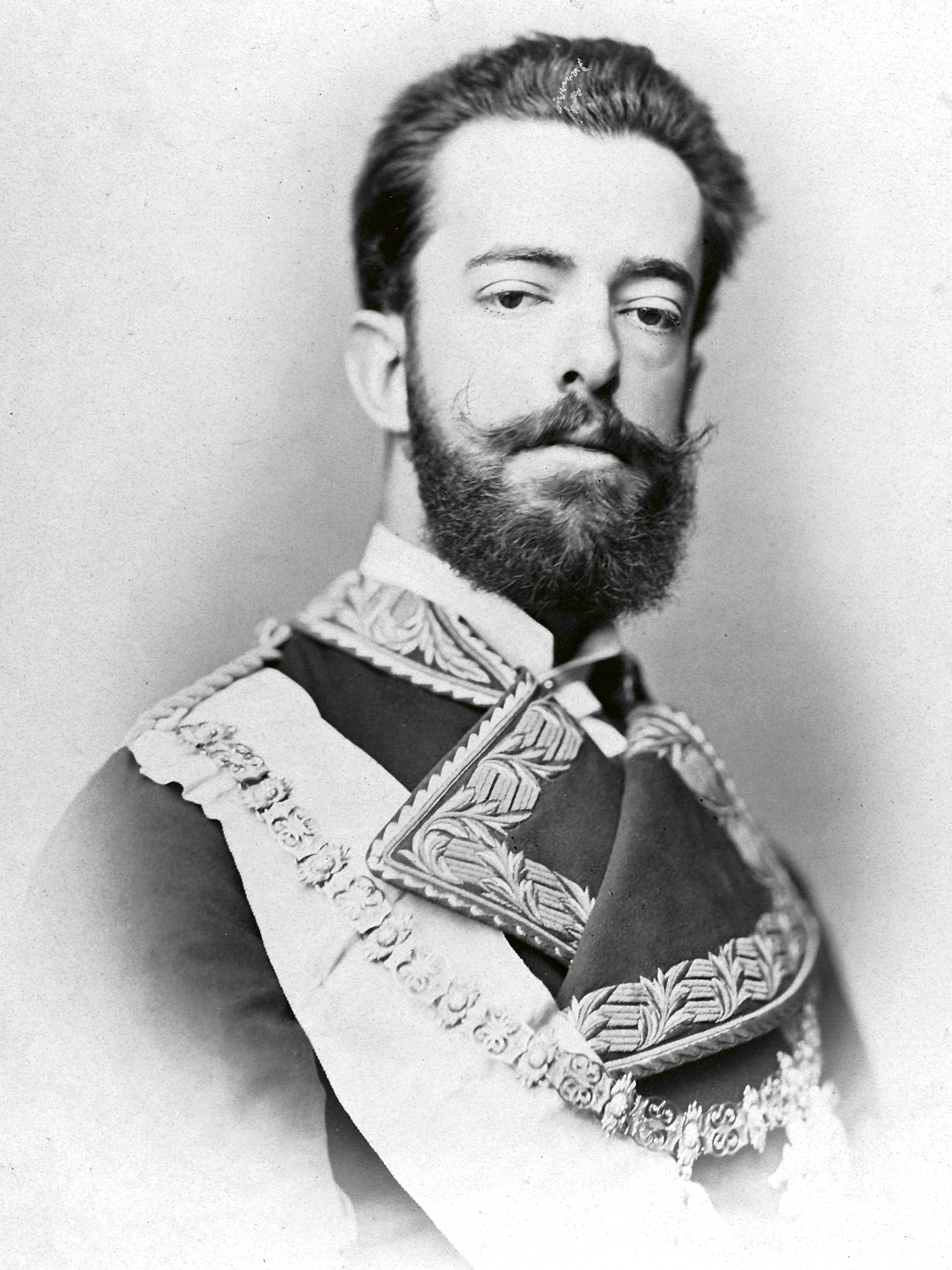
- Formal portrait, c. 1872

King of Spain
- Reign: 16 November 1870 – 11 February 1873
- Predecessor: Isabella II as Queen of Spain
- Successor: Estanislao Figueras as President of the Republic; Alfonso XII as King of Spain
- Prime Ministers: See list: Juan Bautista Topete The Duke of la Torre Manuel Ruiz Zorrilla The Marquess of San Rafael Práxedes Mateo Sagasta The Marquess of Mendigorría Manuel Ruiz Zorrilla
- Born: 30 May 1845; Royal Palace of Turin, Kingdom of Sardinia
- Died: 18 January 1890 (aged 44); Royal Palace of Turin, Kingdom of Italy
- Burial: Basilica of Superga, Italy
- Spouses: Maria Vittoria dal Pozzo (m. 1867; died 1876) Maria Letizia Bonaparte (m. 1888)
- Issue: Prince Emanuele Filiberto, Duke of Aosta; Prince Vittorio Emanuele, Count of Turin; Prince Luigi Amedeo, Duke of the Abruzzi; Prince Umberto, Count of Salemi
Names
- Italian: Amedeo Ferdinando Maria; Spanish: Amadeo Fernando María; English: Amadeus Ferdinand Mary
- House: Savoy
- Father: Victor Emmanuel II of Italy
- Mother: Adelaide of Austria
- Religion: Catholicism

Amadeo I (Italian: Amedeo Ferdinando Maria di Savoia; 30 May 1845 – 18 January 1890), also known as Amadeus, was an Italian prince who reigned as King of Spain from 1870 to 1873. The only king of Spain to come from the House of Savoy, he was the second son of Victor Emmanuel II of Italy and was known for most of his life as the Duke of Aosta, the usual title for a second son in the Savoyard dynasty.

He was elected by the Cortes Generales as Spain's monarch in 1870, following the deposition of Isabella II, and was sworn in the following year. Amadeo's reign was fraught with growing republicanism, Carlist rebellions in the north, the assassination of Prime Minister Juan Prim and the Cuban independence movement. After three tumultuous years on the throne, he abdicated and returned to Italy in 1873, and the First Spanish Republic was declared as a result.

He founded the Aosta branch of Italy's royal House of Savoy, which is junior in agnatic descent to the branch descended from King Umberto I that reigned in Italy until 1946, but senior to the branch of the dukes of Genoa.

== Early life and first marriage ==
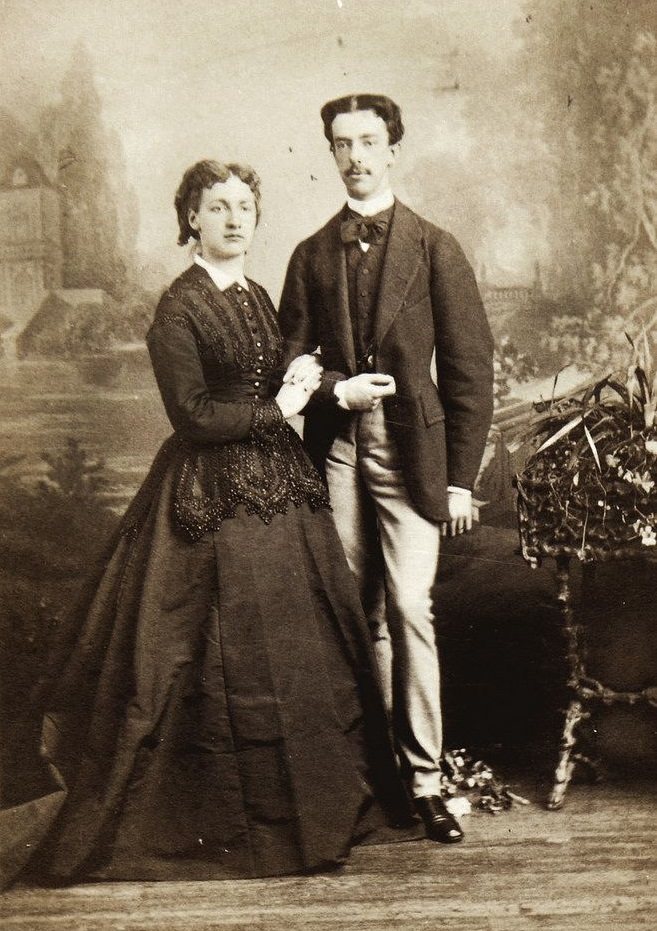
The Duke of Aosta with his first wife, Maria Vittoria dal Pozzo.

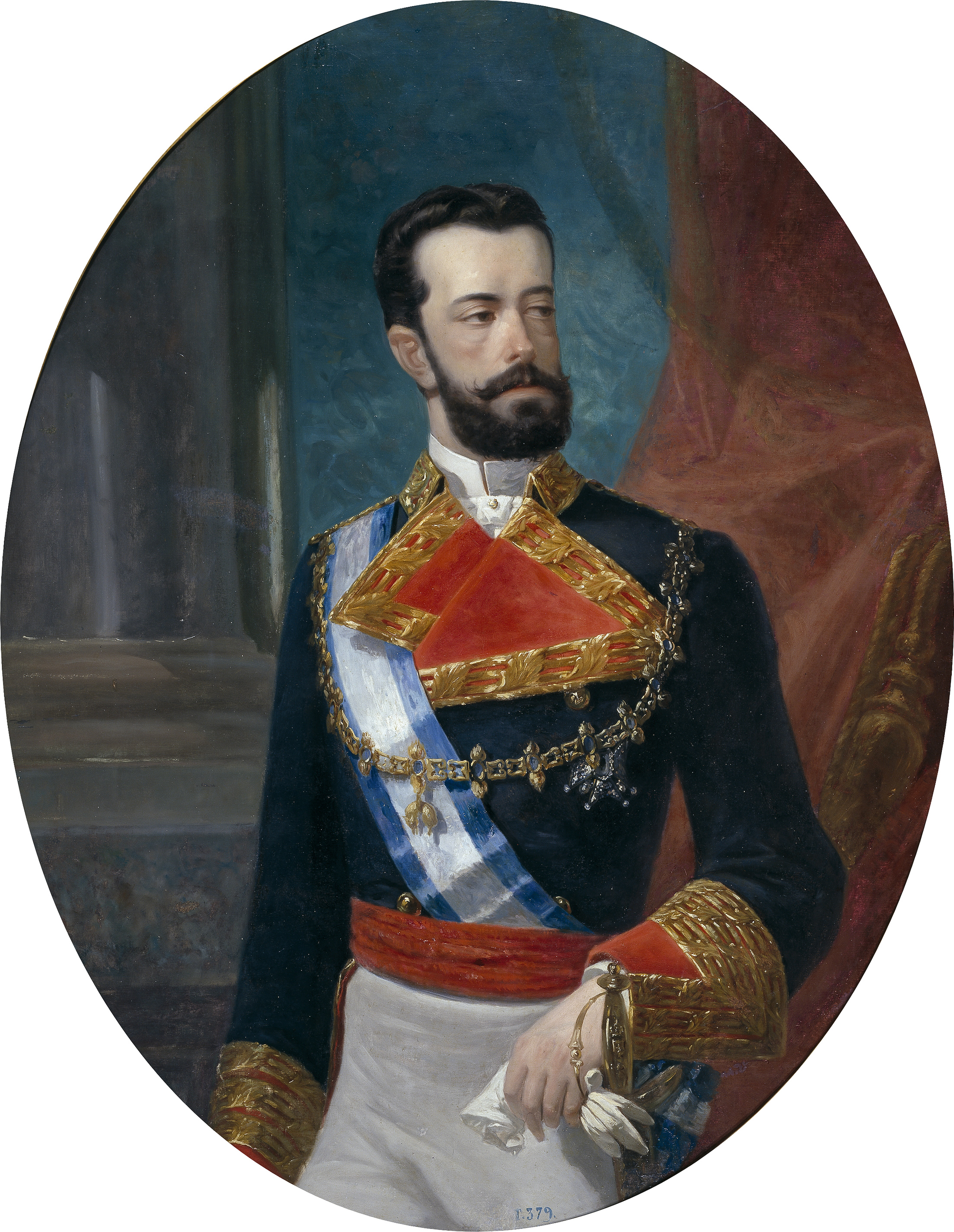
Amadeo painted by Vicente Palmaroli

Prince Amadeo of Savoy was born in Turin, then part of the Kingdom of Sardinia. He was the third child and second son of King Victor Emmanuel II, who would later become the first King of a unified Italy, and of Archduchess Adelaide of Austria. He was granted the hereditary title of Duke of Aosta from birth.

Entering the Royal Sardinian Army as captain in 1859, he fought through the Third Italian War of Independence in 1866 with the rank of major-general. He led his brigade into action at the Battle of Custoza and was wounded at Monte Croce. In 1868, after his marriage, he was made vice admiral of the Italian Royal Navy, but the position ended when he ascended the Spanish throne.

In 1867, his father yielded to the entreaties of the parliamentary deputy Francesco Cassins, and on 30 May of that year, Amedeo was married to Donna Maria Vittoria dal Pozzo. The King initially opposed the match on the grounds that her family was of insufficient rank and that he hoped for his son to marry a German princess. Despite her princely title, Donna Maria Vittoria was not of royal birth and belonged rather to the Piedmontese nobility. She was, however, the sole heir to her father's vast fortune, which subsequent Dukes of Aosta inherited, thereby obtaining wealth independent of their dynastic appanage and allowances from Italy's kings. The wedding day of Prince Amedeo and Donna Maria Vittoria was marred by the death of a station master, who was crushed under the wheels of the honeymoon train.

In March 1870, Maria Vittoria appealed to the King to remonstrate with her husband for marital infidelities, which caused her hurt and embarrassment. However, the King wrote in reply that he understood her feelings, but he considered that she had no right to dictate her husband's behaviour, and her jealousy was unbecoming.

== King of Spain ==
After the Glorious Revolution deposed Isabella II in September 1868, the new Cortes began the task of searching for a suitable liberal-leaning candidate from a new dynasty to replace her. Eventually the Duke of Aosta was taken into consideration. His father was a descendant of King Philip II of Spain through his daughter, Infanta Catalina Micaela of Spain, and her son, Thomas Francis, Prince of Carignano, while his mother was a descendant of King Charles III of Spain through his daughter, Infanta Maria Luisa of Spain. The Savoyard prince was elected king as Amadeo I on 16 November 1870 and swore to uphold the Constitution in Madrid on 2 January 1871. While the new king was on his way to Spain, General Juan Prim, his chief supporter, was assassinated and Amadeo took the oath in the presence of Prim's corpse.

This event deprived Amadeo I of indispensable support, particularly in the critical early days, and proved decisive considering that the progressive faction ultimately split between Prim's two successors, Práxedes Mateo Sagasta and Manuel Ruiz Zorrilla. The new king entered Madrid on 2 January 1871, and that same day he swore allegiance to the 1869 Constitution before the Cortes. Later, he visited the Church of the Virgin of Atocha, where General Prim's funeral chapel had been set up.

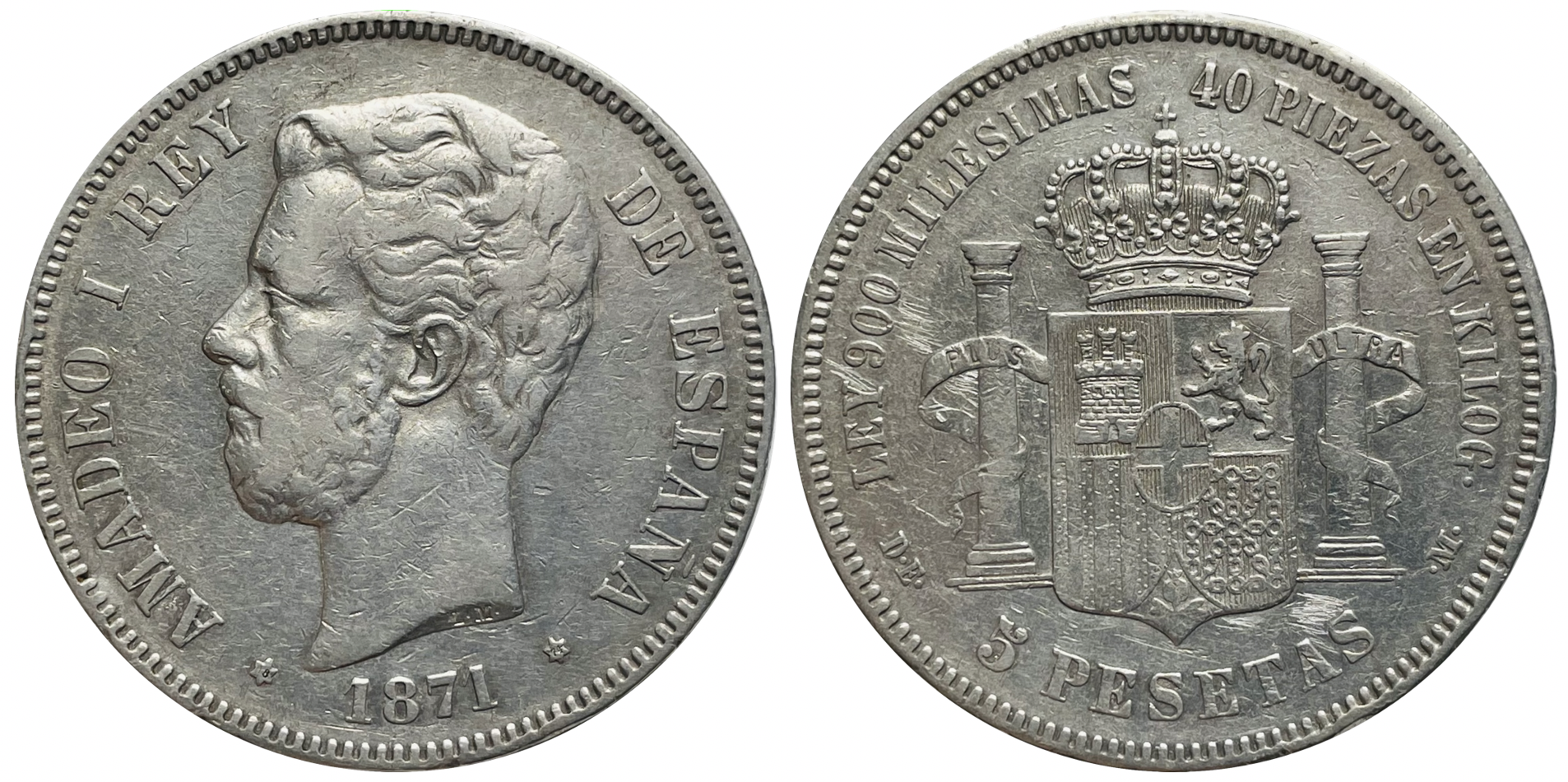
Amadeo as King of Spain on a coin from 1871

=== First year ===
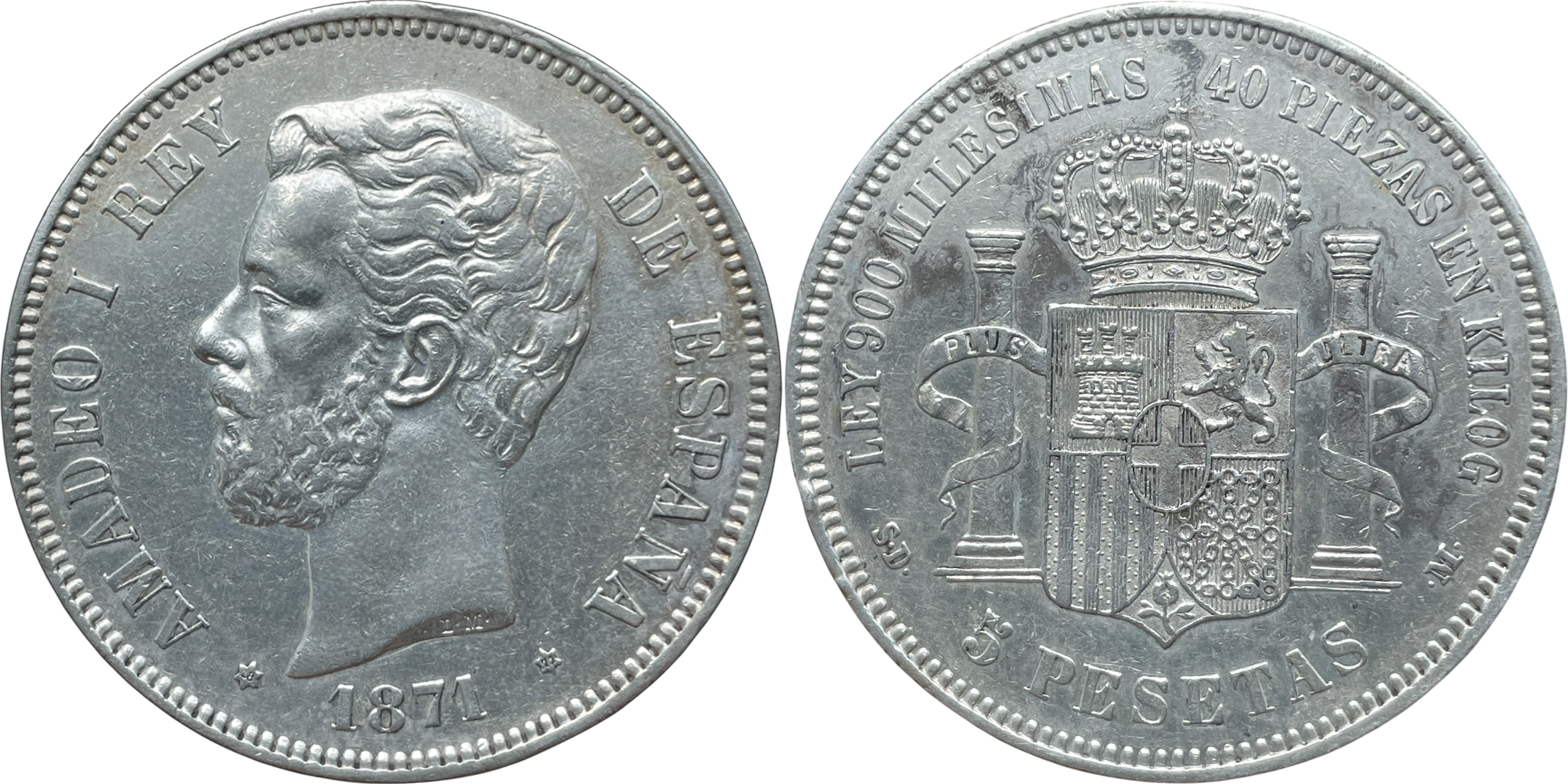
Amadeo I, King of Spain

==== Government of General Serrano ====
Following Prim's assassination, a "conciliation" government formed at his deathbed request under Admiral Topete, soon transitioning to General Serrano, a Unionist who had served as regent from 1869 until Amadeo's arrival. Amadeo proposed Serrano as President of the Council of Ministers to unify the monarchist-democratic coalition backing his throne. Serrano assembled a diverse cabinet: Progressives Sagasta (Minister of the Interior) and Ruiz Zorrilla (Public Works), monarchist Democrat or "Cimbrios" Cristino Martos (Justice), and Unionist Adelardo López de Ayala (Overseas Territories). This mix aimed to bridge factions supporting the new dynasty.

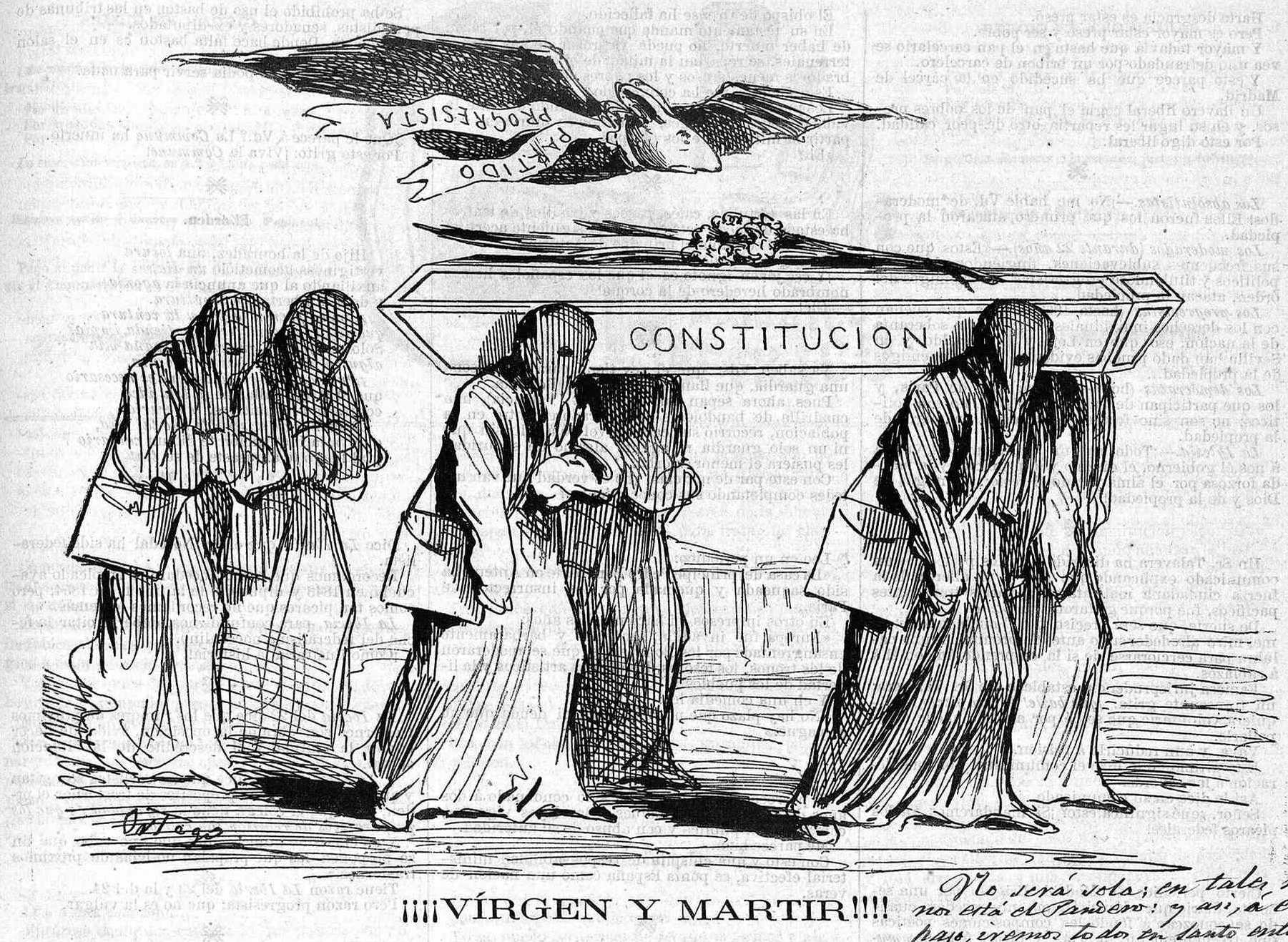
Caricature by Francisco Ortego, ¡¡¡¡Virgen y mártir!!!!, published in Gil Blas, 28 May 1871, mocking the fate of the Constitution under Serrano's government.

Serrano's administration, viewed by some as transitional, prioritized the first elections under Amadeo to secure a strong coalition majority. It enacted an electoral law reverting to district-based voting, abandoning the Progressives' provincial constituencies from 1869. This shift enabled the government to exert "moral influence" in rural areas, ensuring a victory of 235 seats—approximately 130 Progressives, over 80 "borderline" or "Aostist" Unionists loyal to Amadeo, and about 20 monarchist Democrats. However, opposition forces—52 Republicans advocating a federal republic, 51 Carlists pushing traditional monarchy, and 18 Moderates—gained significant representation. Dissident Unionists under Ríos Rosas, backing the Duke of Montpensier, and Antonio Cánovas del Castillo, supporting Prince Alfonso of Bourbon, secured 7 and 9 seats, respectively. This opposition's strength magnified the governing coalition's internal fragility.

As Serrano's government and the Cortes tackled the Constitution's democratic principles—such as establishing juries, separation of church and state, abolishing Quintos (Spain) (military conscription), and addressing the war and slavery in Cuba—tensions surfaced. Unionists and Sagasta's Progressives argued that crowning the Constitution with the Savoy dynasty required preserving order, while Ruiz Zorrilla's Progressives and Democrats insisted on immediate social, economic, and political reforms to consolidate the regime. Sagasta, likely echoing Prim's vision, sought conciliation with Serrano's Unionists as a dynastic right (conservative party), positioning himself as leader of the dynastic left (liberal party) and opposing Carlists and Republicans outright. Conversely, Ruiz Zorrilla championed an alliance with Democrats (cimbrios) through a reformist agenda, aiming to integrate Republicans into the monarchy by proving their goals were achievable within it. Sagasta saw this as handing the regime to its enemies, rejecting collaboration with Republicans and distrusting Ruiz Zorrilla's loyalty, thus fracturing the coalition and dooming "conciliation."

==== Opposition to the monarchy of Amadeo I ====
The high nobility and ecclesiastical hierarchy refused to recognize Amadeo's monarchy, viewing it as the embodiment of the 1868 Revolution that ended Isabella II's reign, where they held privilege. They feared it would dismantle their status or pave the way for Republicans and "socialists" opposing property and a confessional state. The nobility adopted a Casticist stance, claiming to defend "Spanish values" against the "foreign king," boycotting the court and snubbing Amadeo, openly loyal to the Bourbons. A notable incident, the "Rebellion of the Mantillas," described by Father Luis Coloma in Pequeñeces..., saw aristocratic women parade in lace mantillas and fleur-de-lis—symbols of Restoration—isolating Amadeo and Queen Maria Vittoria in a "court of furrile capes and shopkeepers," as critics sneered.

The Church opposed Amadeo as the son of Italy's Victor Emmanuel II, who had stripped Pope Pius IX of the Papal States, resisting religious freedom and measures toward church-state separation. Influenced by the Syllabus of Errors, the hierarchy wielded significant sway over Catholic middle classes and rural parishes, amplifying rejection of the regime. Amadeo countered by ennobling industrial and financial bourgeois supporters, but defections grew, especially among those tied to Cuban slavery—threatened by radical abolition plans—and Catalan industrialists opposing the 1869 free trade system, which Radicals upheld.

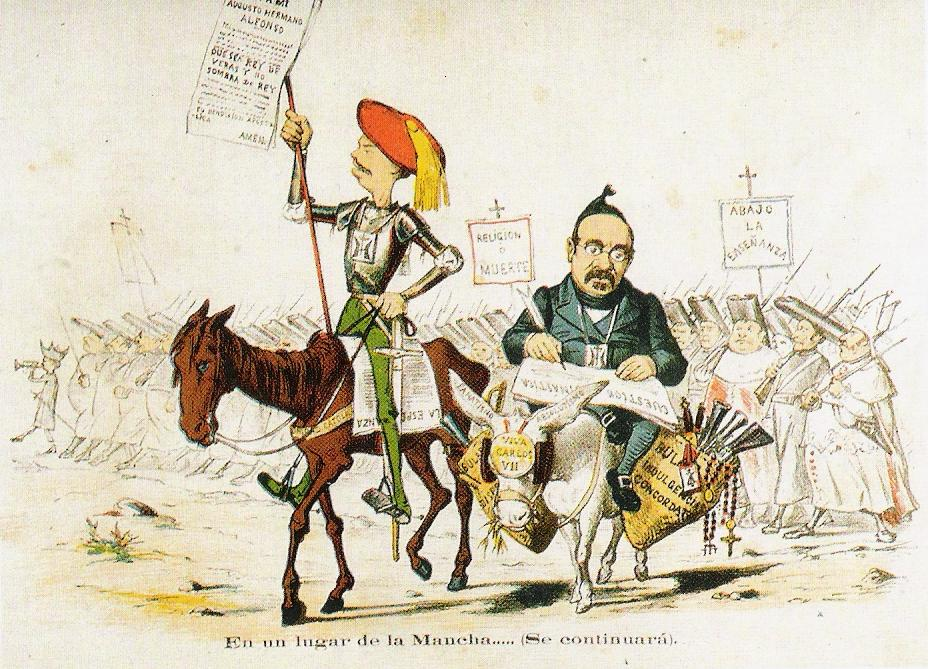
Caricature from La Flaca (magazine), August 1869, showing neo-Catholic Cándido Nocedal and Carlist Carlos VII.

The Carlists, thriving since 1868 beyond their Basque, Catalan, and Valencian strongholds, backed Carlos VII, grandson of Carlos María Isidro, seeking a traditional monarchy. Their neo-Catholic wing, led by Cándido Nocedal, pursued a "legal route," allying with Republicans in 1871 elections to win 51 deputies and 21 senators. Amadeo's election irked them, though Nocedal restrained uprisings until September 1871. Republicans, rejecting monarchy entirely, pushed for a Federal Republic, inspired by France's Second Empire fall. The Federal Republican Party united diverse factions—property defenders, "socialists," and federalists like Francisco Pi y Margall and Nicolás Salmerón—split between legalists open to Radical cooperation and insurrectionists favoring revolt.

==== First government of Ruiz Zorrilla ====
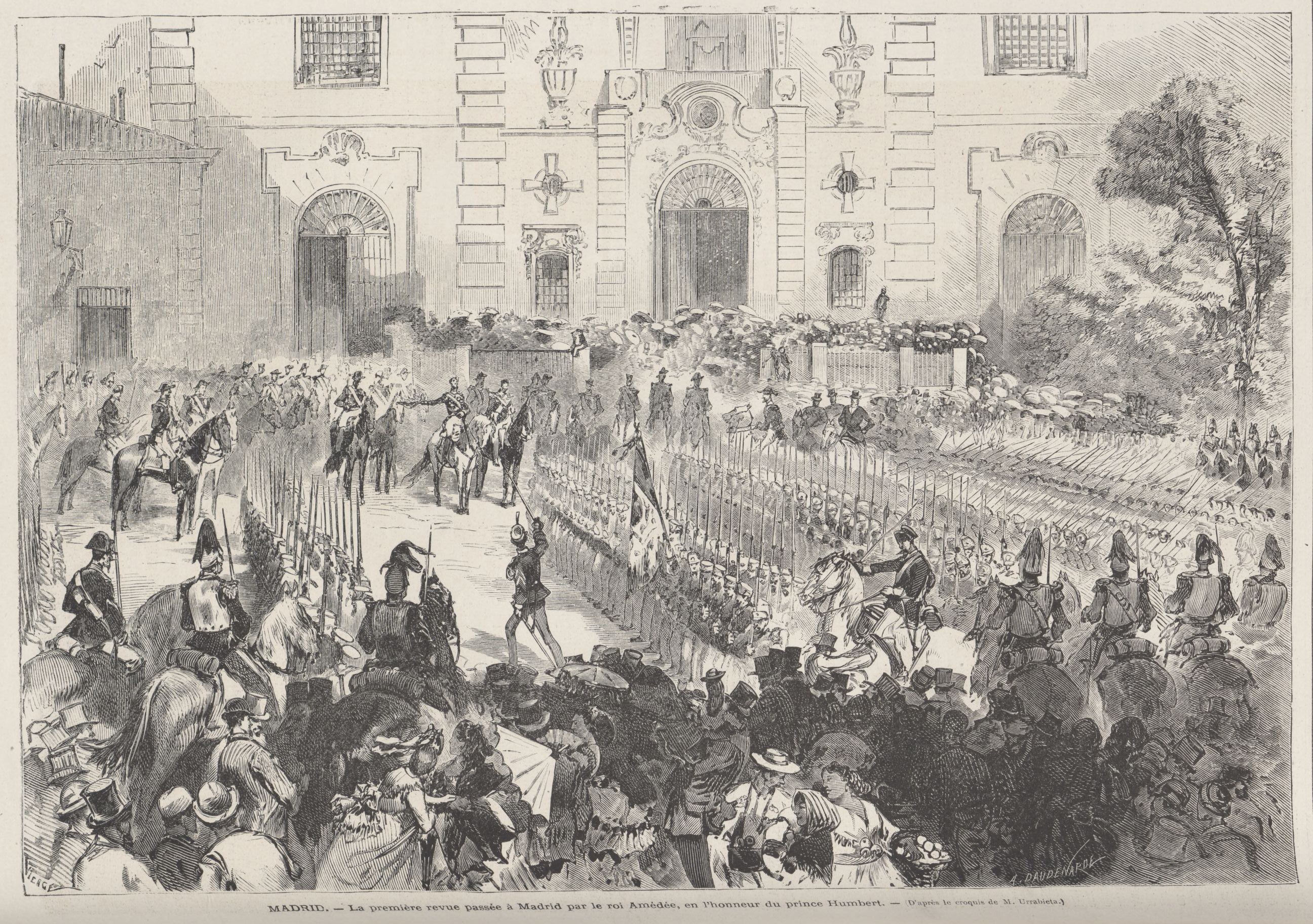
Amadeo I reviewing troops in Madrid, September 1871, by Daniel Vierge.

On 15 July 1871, radical ministers—Manuel Ruiz Zorrilla, Cristino Martos, José María Beránger, and Moret—resigned from Serrano's "conciliation" government, aiming to end its broad coalition and force a split between conservatives and radicals. King Amadeo I, still favoring unity, reluctantly appointed Ruiz Zorrilla as president on 24 July, sidelining both Unionists and Sagasta's Progressives in their plan to sustain the coalition amid regime threats. Ruiz Zorrilla sought to include Sagasta's faction, but Sagasta refused, arguing in Congress that an "exclusive party" policy endangered the monarchy.

Ruiz Zorrilla then formed a government of his Progressive faction and Democrats, taking the Interior portfolio himself. The cabinet included Eugenio Montero Ríos (Justice), General Fernando Fernández de Córdova (War), Servando Ruiz Gómez (Finance), Santiago Diego-Madrazo (Public Works), Tomás María Mosquera (Overseas), and Vice-Admiral José María Beránger (Navy). Martos declined the State Ministry. Presented to the Cortes on 25 July, the government's motto—"liberty, morality, civility"—signaled a reformist agenda.

Tensions escalated when Democrats maneuvered to replace Salustiano Olózaga as Congress president with their leader Nicolás María Rivero. Sagasta's Progressives countered by nominating Sagasta, fearing Rivero's republican leanings. On 1–2 October, Ruiz Zorrilla and Sagasta met to avert a Progressive split, but Ruiz Zorrilla rejected Sagasta's compromise candidate, prioritizing his radical-Democrat (Cimbrios) alliance over party unity. Sagasta warned, "You stay with the cimbrios and break with your long-standing friends; the consequences will be dire." On 3 October, Sagasta defeated Rivero (123–113) for Congress president, a result Ruiz Zorrilla saw as a no-confidence vote, prompting his resignation.

Amadeo, returning from a popularity-boosting tour of eastern Spain—including a visit to General Espartero in Logroño, who pledged loyalty—refused Ruiz Zorrilla's request to dissolve the Cortes, citing no constitutional basis or formal censure. Sagasta confirmed ongoing support for the 25 July program and urged the king to convince Ruiz Zorrilla to stay, highlighting the government's intact majority.

==== Malcampo government ====
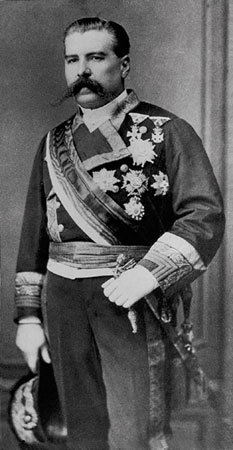
José Malcampo, president, 5 October – 21 December 1871.

With Ruiz Zorrilla unyielding, Amadeo offered the premiership to Espartero, who declined due to age, then to Sagasta, who suggested José Malcampo—a revolutionary naval officer from 1868—to avoid direct confrontation. Malcampo, appointed 5 October, was a Progressive seen as non-reactionary due to his role alongside Topete in the Glorious Revolution. His government, a bridge to Sagasta's eventual leadership on 21 December, oversaw the Progressive Party's irreparable split into Sagasta's conservative faction, aligned with the Liberal Union, and Ruiz Zorrilla's "democratic progressive" or Radical Party, including Democrats (cimbrios) like Martos and Rivero.

Sagasta's faction pursued reunification on their "historical" program, prioritizing national sovereignty over individual rights, which the Cortes could regulate for order. Ruiz Zorrilla's group upheld the sanctity of rights, leaving excesses to courts. Malcampo's all-Progressive cabinet—excluding Unionists—retained Ruiz Zorrilla's 25 July program, signaling a transitional intent. However, "Zorrillists" declared Ruiz Zorrilla their "active head" (Espartero as "passive head"), betting on reforms to align the monarchy with the people and win Republican support. Sagasta's Progressives responded by forming their own party board on 20 October, formalizing the divide. Reconciliation efforts by figures like Ángel Fernández de los Ríos failed, with elders like Olózaga and Espartero favoring Sagasta.

==== Debate on the Spanish IWA ====
Emblem of the Spanish IWA

Malcampo sought to prove the monarchy's firmness by proposing to outlaw the Spanish IWA, founded in 1870, amid fears sparked by the Paris Commune (March–May 1871). Unionists, Sagasta's Progressives, and Carlists backed the ban, viewing the IWA as a threat, while Republicans opposed it, defending freedom of association. Ruiz Zorrilla's faction, torn between supporting rights and avoiding a "disorder" label, abstained, missing a chance for unity. On 10 November, the Cortes voted 192–38 to ban the IWA, but the Supreme Court's prosecutor blocked enforcement, citing constitutional protections, allowing the IWA to persist.

==== Vote of no confidence and municipal elections ====
On 13 November, Radicals moved a no-confidence vote against Malcampo, dubbed a "pirate ministry" for alleged corruption, aiming to preempt elections. Carlists joined with a religious motion, but on 17 November, Malcampo's 127 supporters (Sagasta's Progressives and Unionists) lost to 166 opposition votes (Radicals, Republicans, Carlists). Amadeo suspended the Cortes, avoiding resignation, citing the radical-anti-dynastic alliance as a scandal. In the 9 December municipal elections, Radicals allied with Republicans, claiming 400 of 600 key municipalities against Malcampo's 200, though the government won 25 of 47 provincial capitals. High abstention (40–50%) muddied results, and Amadeo rejected Ruiz Zorrilla's bid for power.

End of Malcampo's Government Facing Cortes reopening, Malcampo resigned 19 December, seeing no path to Progressive unity. Amadeo appointed Sagasta on 21 December, honoring parliamentary norms as Congress president succeeded a resigning premier without constitutional breach.

=== Second year ===
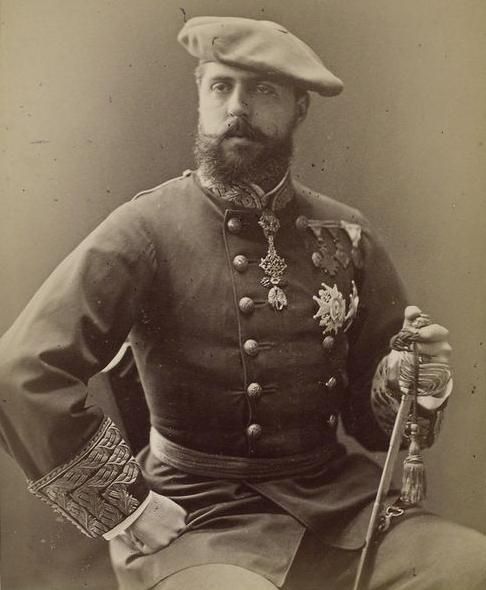
Carlos María de Borbón y Austria-Este, the Carlist pretender to the throne.

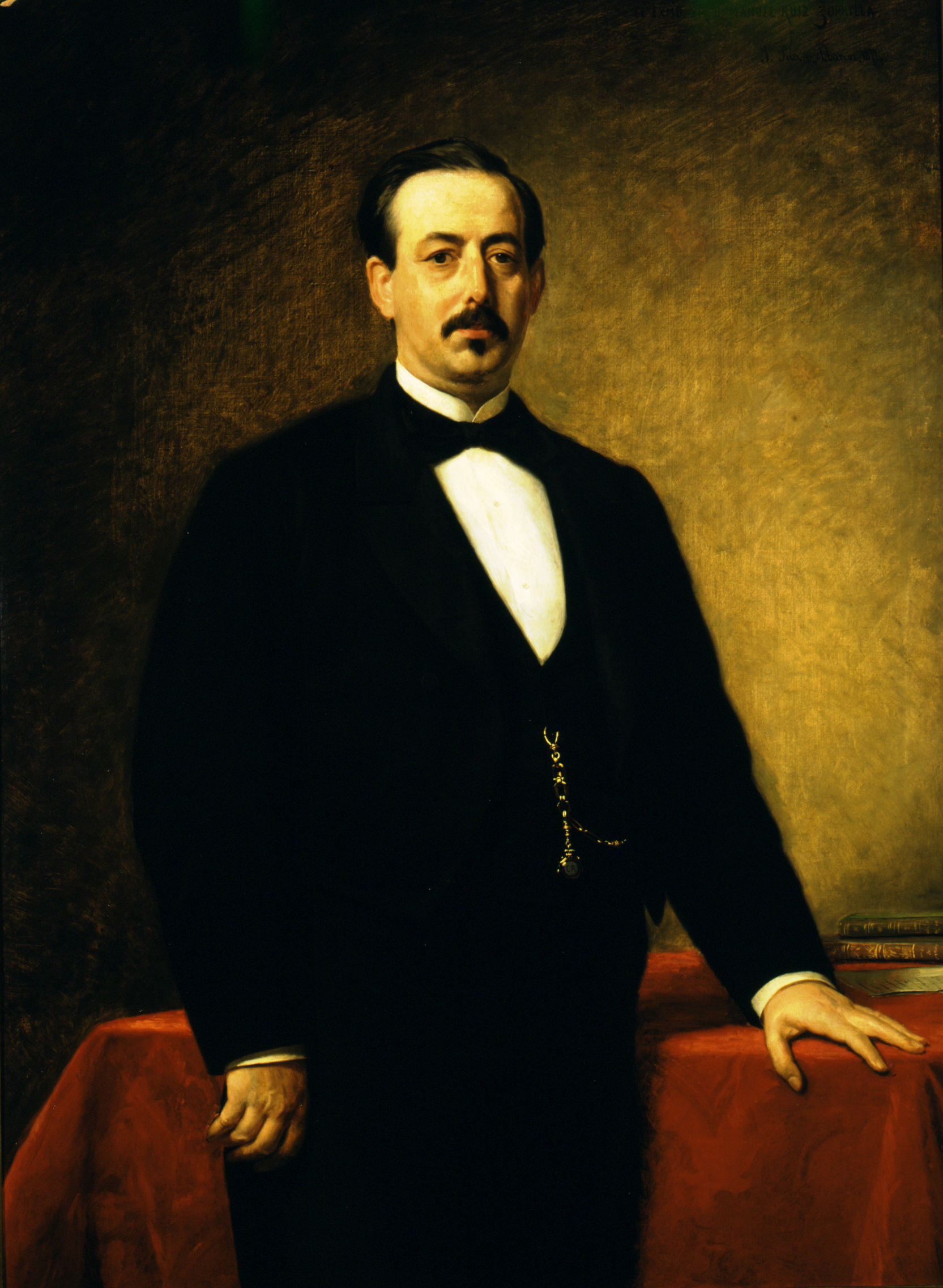
Manuel Ruiz Zorrilla.

In 1872, persistent government crises worsened political and parliamentary stability, undermining Amadeo I's monarchy. Historian Ángel Bahamonde observes, "If in 1871 there had been a succession of government crises, in 1872 the persistence of the same crises led to a progressive deterioration of political and parliamentary life," with dire consequences for the Savoy dynasty.

==== Sagasta's government ====
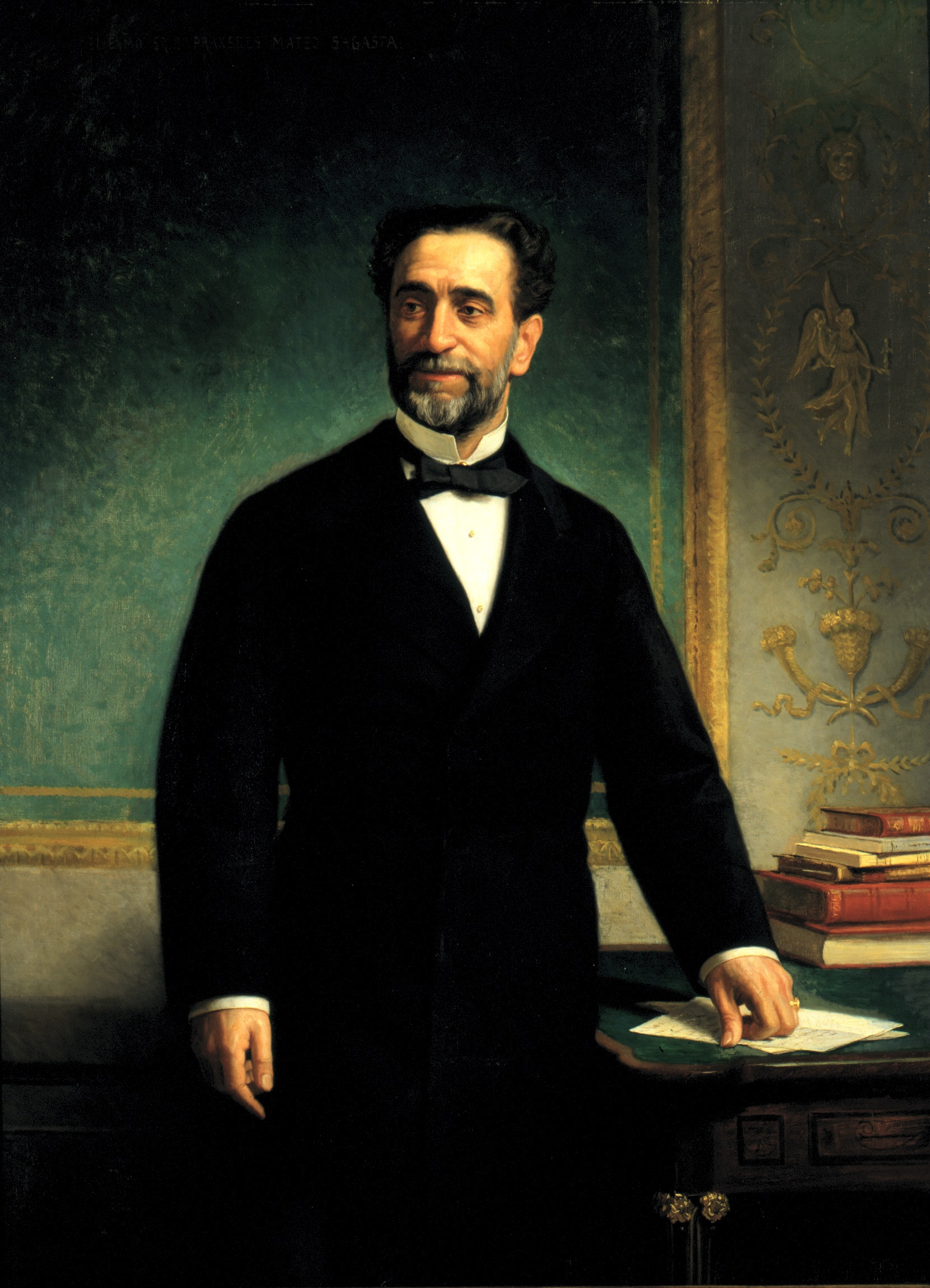
Práxedes Mateo Sagasta

On 21 December 1871, Práxedes Mateo Sagasta formed a government, initially offering Manuel Ruiz Zorrilla's Radicals four of eight cabinet posts—half the government—to unify Progressives. The Radicals declined, unwilling to abandon their alliance with Democrats (Cimbrios) or their "benevolent pact" with Republicans. At a meeting, Ruiz Zorrilla told Sagasta, "I am more than a progressive, I am a radical." Sagasta then allied with General Serrano's Unionists, who joined with one portfolio—Admiral Topete as Minister of Overseas Territories. Most posts went to "historical" Progressives: José Malcampo (War and Navy), Bonifacio de Blas (Interior), and others like Santiago de Angulo, Francisco de Paula Angulo, and Alonso Colmenares.

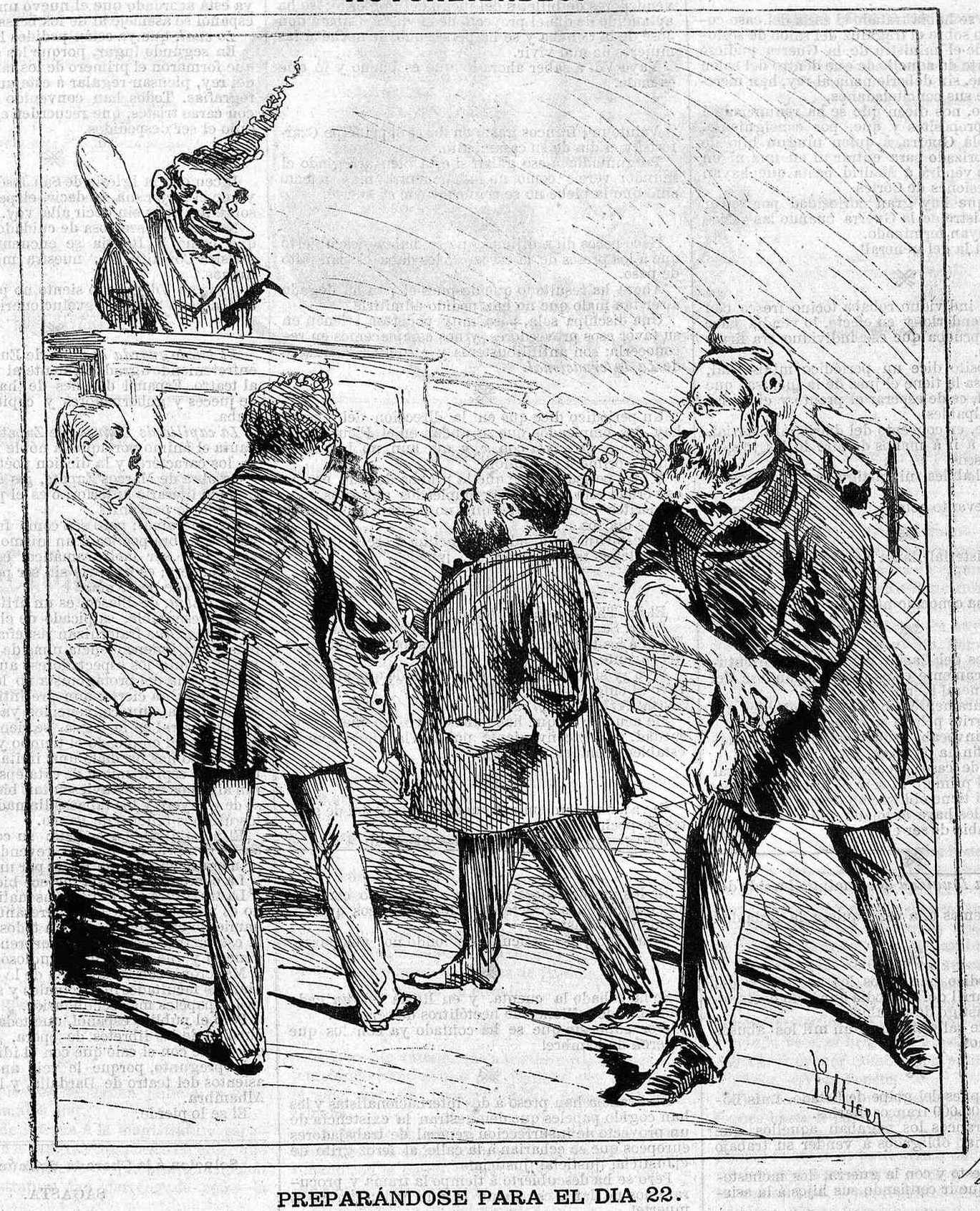
Cartoon by Josep Lluís Pellicer, Preparing for the 22nd, Gil Blas, 14 January 1872, showing Francesc Pi i Margall and Sagasta.

On 22 January 1872, Sagasta presented his government to the Cortes, labeling it "progressive-conservative." He aimed to balance the 1869 Constitution's rights with order, defending the monarchy as "the essential foundation of public liberties." He proposed a two-party system of "loyal and benevolent" parties—one more progressive, one less so, both liberal-conservative. The Cortes rejected it, but with more dynastic votes in favor, Amadeo granted Sagasta a dissolution decree for new elections to secure a majority. Radicals rallied with "Radicals defend yourselves!" and "God save the country! God save the dynasty! God save freedom!" while Republicans declared, "The King has broken with Parliament, today the Savoy dynasty ends."

Radicals blamed a palace camarilla—Italian advisers like Dragonetti and Nicolás Ronchi, conservatives, and Queen Maria Vittoria's neo-Catholic allies—for blocking their power. On 23 January, Ruiz Zorrilla criticized the king in the Cortes, invoking a "right to revolt" against threatened freedoms. Radical newspapers turned on Amadeo, and leaders boycotted palace lunches (except Moret). At a 2 February rally, José Echegaray demanded the Palacio de Oriente "open its windows" to freedom, while El Imparcial (22 February) likened Amadeo's rule to Isabella II's, branding Sagasta's ministry "reactionary." Radical Francisco Salmerón wrote to his father in January 1872:

"The palace is not hostile, for the king delights in courtesans; and the queen in neo-politics. The infamous Sagasta is waging an implacable war against the Radicals... We go into the electoral struggle with the proof of defeat; then, in retreat, we shall witness the catastrophe."

===== Birth of the Constitutional Party and the "National Coalition" =====
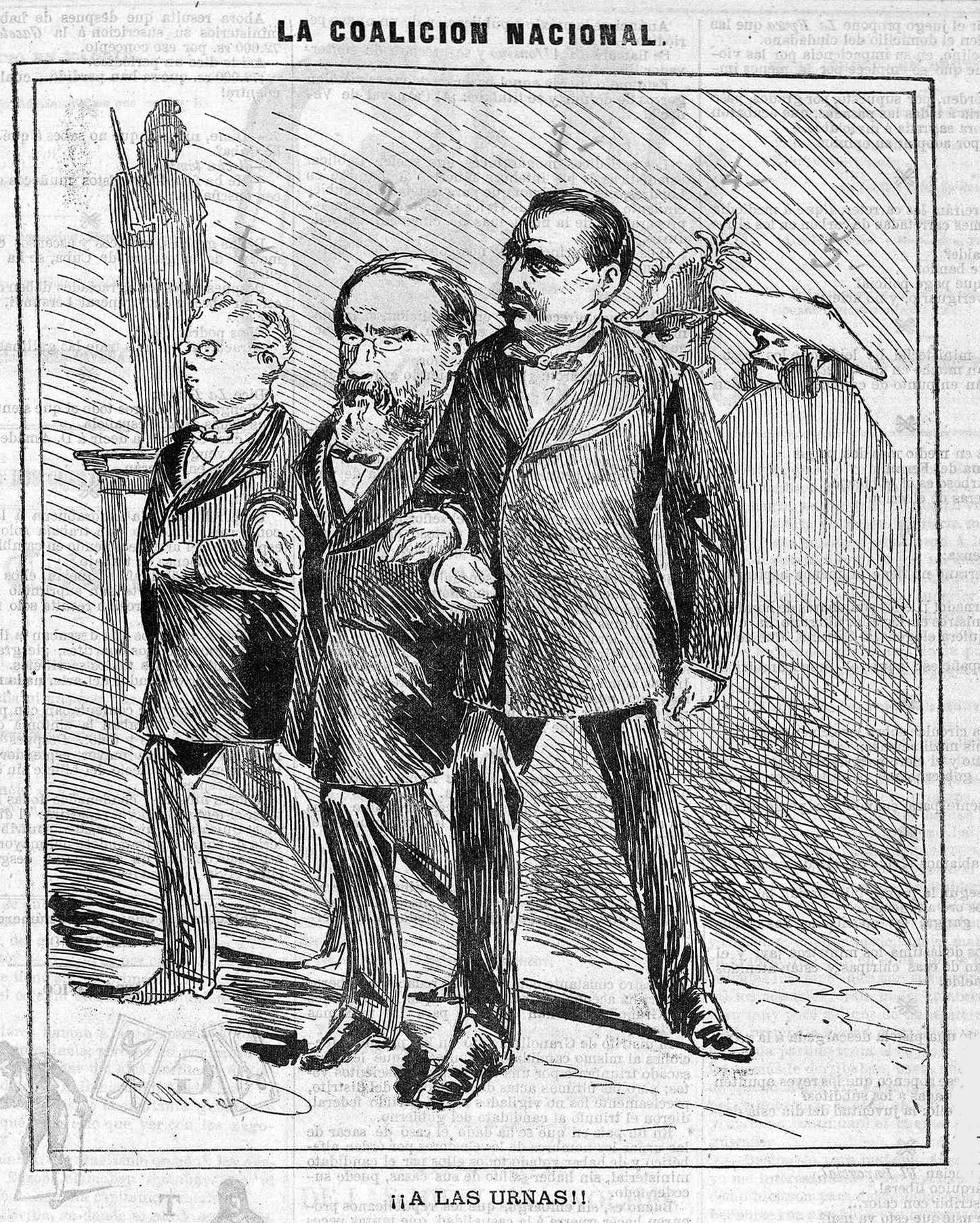
Caricature by Josep Lluís Pellicer, La coalición nacional, Gil Blas, 10 March 1872.

Sagasta's Progressives and Unionists formed an electoral committee on 22 January, issuing a manifesto summarizing the government's program. Unionists pushed for a single party, but Sagasta envisioned a "third party" blending both sides to reunite Progressives. Amadeo intervened, tasking Unionist José Luis Albareda with drafting a plan for a Conservative Party to alternate with Radicals. Facing royal pressure—and after briefly resigning—Sagasta relented. On 21 February 1872, the Constitutional Party emerged, aiming to defend "Liberty, the Constitution of 1869, the dynasty of Amadeo I, and territorial integrity." The reshuffled cabinet balanced four Progressives and three Unionists under Sagasta.

The Radicals, seeking to topple the government, expanded their December 1871 "National Coalition" with Republicans to include Carlists and later Alfonsist Moderates. United by the goal of "defeating the government, the fruit of immorality and lies," they used patriotic slogans like "Spain for the Spaniards," championed by Republican Emilio Castelar. The coalition agreed to field one candidate per district—favoring the strongest prior performer—to maximize votes.

===== Elections of April 1872 =====
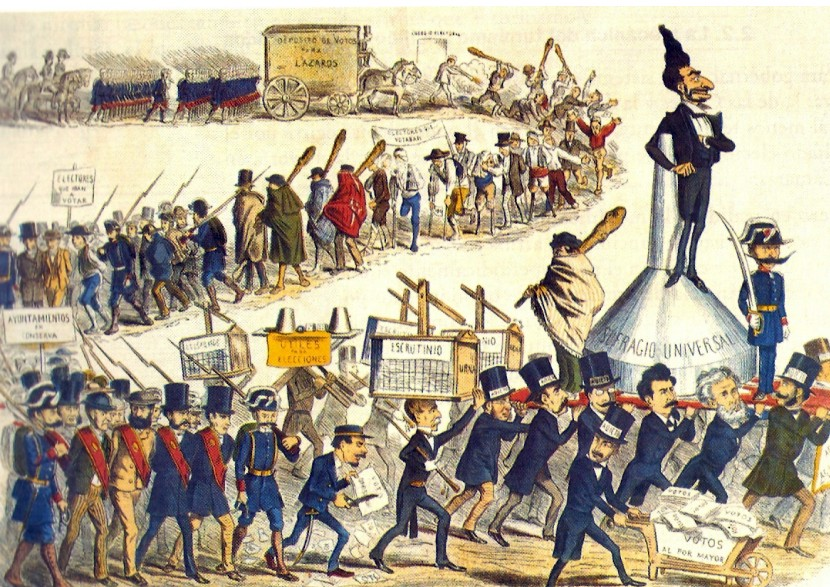
Cartoon from La Carcajada, 18 April 1872, mocking Sagasta's electoral fraud.

The 2 April elections delivered the Constitutionalists over 200 seats, with Unionists outnumbering Progressives, bolstering Serrano's influence. Victory came via "moral influence"—electoral manipulation—despite Amadeo's plea for fairness, to which Sagasta replied, "as pure as they can be in Spain." A circular to governors outlined tactics: buying votes, crowding polling stations with loyalists, and using police to suppress dissent. The National Coalition secured nearly 150 seats—Radicals 42, Republicans, Carlists, and Alfonsists combined—amid high abstention and unrest in Carlist (Basque, Navarre) and Federalist (Mediterranean) regions. The Radicals' poor showing questioned Ruiz Zorrilla's leadership, pushing some toward abandoning legal means.

The elections finalized the Progressive Party's split: Sagasta's faction merged with Unionists into the Constitutional Party, while Ruiz Zorrilla led the Radical Party with Democrats (cimbrios), including Cristino Martos and Nicolás María Rivero.

==== Carlist Uprising ====
In the April 1872 elections, Carlists dropped from 51 to 38 seats, empowering their insurrectionist faction over Cándido Nocedal's neo-Catholic legalists. Their 8 March manifesto hinted at war: "now to the ballot box, then to wherever God calls us." On 14 April, Carlos VII ordered elected deputies to boycott the Cortes and launched the Third Carlist War, planned as a fallback if Nocedal's parliamentary strategy failed. Nocedal resigned immediately. In a manifesto, Carlos VII rallied Spaniards:

"The holy religion of our fathers is persecuted... anarchy triumphs, the treasury is plundered... If this continues, the poor will be left without bread and Spain without honour... For the sake of our God, our country, and your King, rise up, Spaniards!"

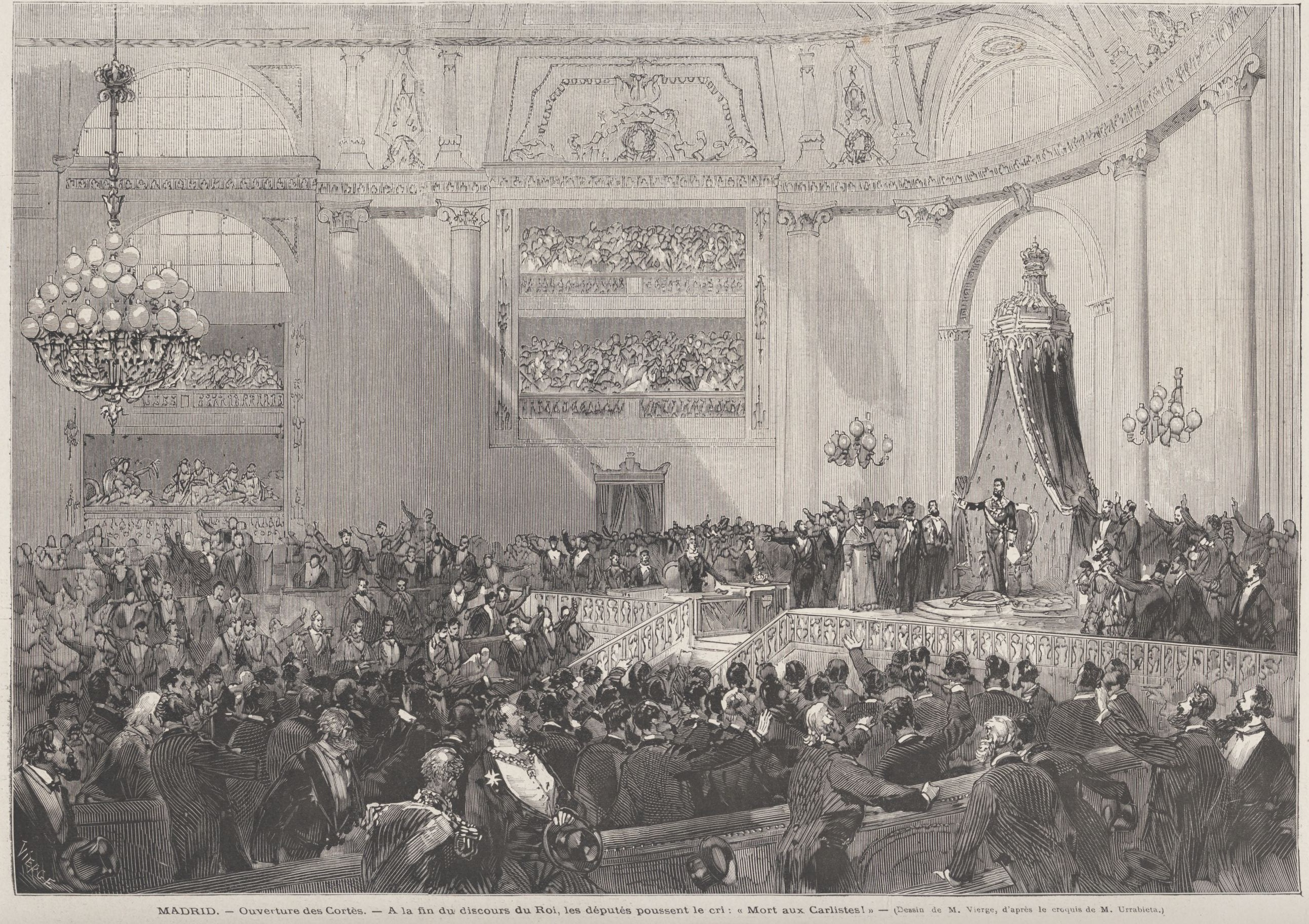
Deputies shout "Death to the Carlists," May 1872, Le Monde Illustré.

On 2 May, Carlos VII entered Spain via Vera de Bidasoa, proclaiming "Down with the foreigner and long live Spain!" Defeated at the Battle of Oroquieta on 4 May, he fled to France. General Serrano, commanding the northern army, signed the Amorebieta Convention on 24 May with Biscay's Carlist deputies, ending Basque-Aragon fighting via amnesty and reinstating rebel officers—a move criticized as overly lenient by the military, Radicals, and Republicans. Catalonia's Carlist activity persisted, with Carlos VII promising to restore Catalan fueros on 16 June, until a new Basque-Aragon uprising in December 1872; the war outlasted Amadeo's reign, ending in 1876.

==== Fall of the Sagasta Government and the "Lightning" Government of Serrano ====
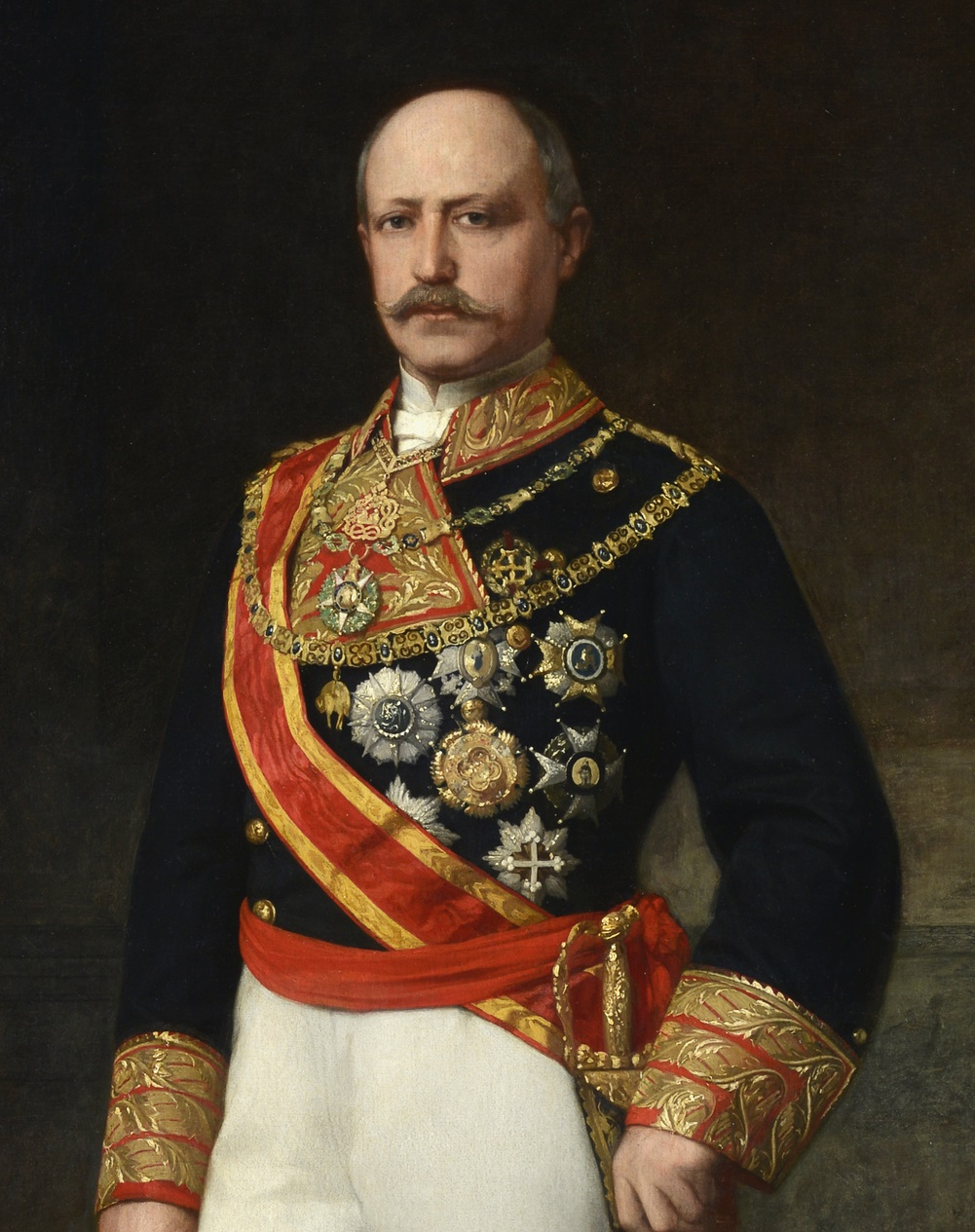
General Serrano

Sagasta's government faltered in May 1872 after a scandal over two million reales diverted from the Overseas to the Interior Ministry, likely for electoral fraud via lázaros—votes cast by the dead. Rumours also tied it to a hushed-up affair involving Amadeo or Serrano's circle, though corruption was the probable cause. Sagasta's defence—claiming reserved payments to thwart conspiracies—relied on forged documents, exposing illegalities. Denied a confidence vote by his majority, including Unionists more irked by the breach than the funds, Sagasta resigned on 22 May.

On 26 May, Amadeo appointed Serrano, then fighting Carlists, as president, assuming his coalition's Cortes majority held. Serrano's cabinet mixed three ex-Progressives and five ex-Unionists, including an Alfonsist from Antonio Cánovas del Castillo's faction. Admiral Topete presented it to Congress on 27 May, as Serrano was delayed. Unexpectedly, Manuel Ruiz Zorrilla pledged "loyal, legal, and respectful opposition," accepting constitutional monarchy rules—a shift contested by Radicals like Cristino Martos, who rejected waiting years for power or aiding "reaction." Unsupported, Ruiz Zorrilla resigned his seat on 31 May after meeting Amadeo for his birthday, retiring to his Soria estate, "La Tablada," unwilling to join an anti-dynastic or insurrectionary path. Radical press blamed the king and queen.

The Amorebieta Convention nearly toppled Serrano, with ministers opposing rebel officer reinstatement as a "degradation" of the army and government. Amadeo's backing and Cortes ratification (Republicans against, Radicals abstaining) saved it, and Serrano took office 4 June. Yet, Radicals under Martos and Republicans challenged Serrano's legitimacy, citing his Alfonsist inclusion, fueling pre-revolutionary rhetoric like "The Revolution is dead! Long live the Revolution!" El Imparcial's 10 June piece, "The Madwoman of the Vatican," subtly attacked Queen Maria Vittoria.

On 6 June, Radicals mobilised Madrid's Volunteers of Liberty to protest in the Plaza Mayor. Serrano quartered troops and, on 11 June, sought a decree suspending constitutional guarantees—approved by the Cortes—to curb a looming Republican uprising, which Radicals seemed poised to join post-Ruiz Zorrilla. A planned 16 June rally under "The September Revolution and the Freedom of the Motherland" omitted the dynasty, alarming Amadeo. Refusing to sign and risk civil conflict, he forced Serrano's resignation on 12 June. The militia gathered that day dispersed upon hearing the news. Serrano, after less than 20 days, retired to Arjona, telling a French diplomat, "We must get rid of that imbecile", referring to Amadeo.

Jorge Vilches reflects:

"The king was almost completely isolated... with a strong anti-dynastic opposition, weak constitutional parties... political leaders unable to unite, and an unsupportive populace. By 12 June 1872, his situation was dire: Prim dead, Ruiz Zorrilla retired, Sagasta facing prosecution... two civil wars, and a Republican threat looming."

Constitutionalists, learning Ruiz Zorrilla would replace Serrano with a Cortes dissolution, decried an "unprecedented coup d'état", citing its unconstitutionality (four months hadn't passed since the last election) and the regime's instability—three elections, multiple crises in 18 months. They petitioned Amadeo to reject it, promising support instead.

==== Second Ruiz Zorrilla government ====
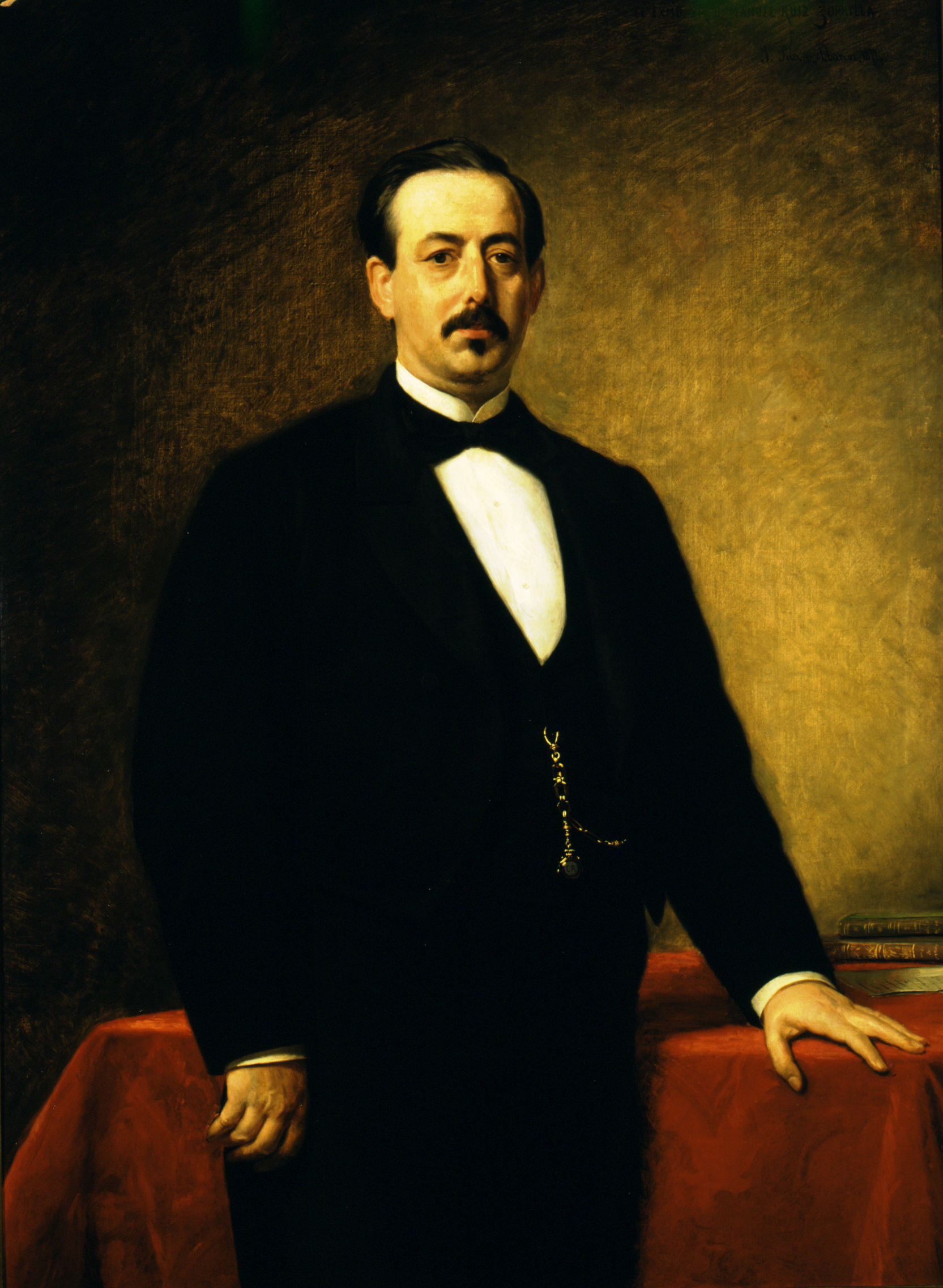
Manuel Ruiz Zorrilla.

Post-Serrano, Amadeo tapped General Fernando Fernández de Córdova as interim president until Ruiz Zorrilla's return, calming radical press criticism. Up to 300 Radicals, led by Nicolás María Rivero, José María Beránger, and Francisco Salmerón, visited "La Tablada" to recall Ruiz Zorrilla, greeted by thousands in Madrid. He demanded an unconstitutional Cortes dissolution and elections—less than four months since April—pressuring Amadeo, who yielded, appearing partisan to Radicals. Jorge Vilches calls this a "coup d'état" by Radicals forcing power via threats and constitutional breaches.

Ruiz Zorrilla formed his 13 June government, taking the Interior Ministry, with ex-Democrats Martos (State) and Echegaray (Public Works), ex-Progressives Eduardo Gasset y Artime (Overseas), Servando Ruiz Gómez (Finance), Eugenio Montero Ríos (Justice), and Beránger (Navy), plus Fernández de Córdoba (War). Rivero was slated for the Congress Speaker. A purge dismissed 40,000 civil servants for loyalists.

===== Assassination attempt =====
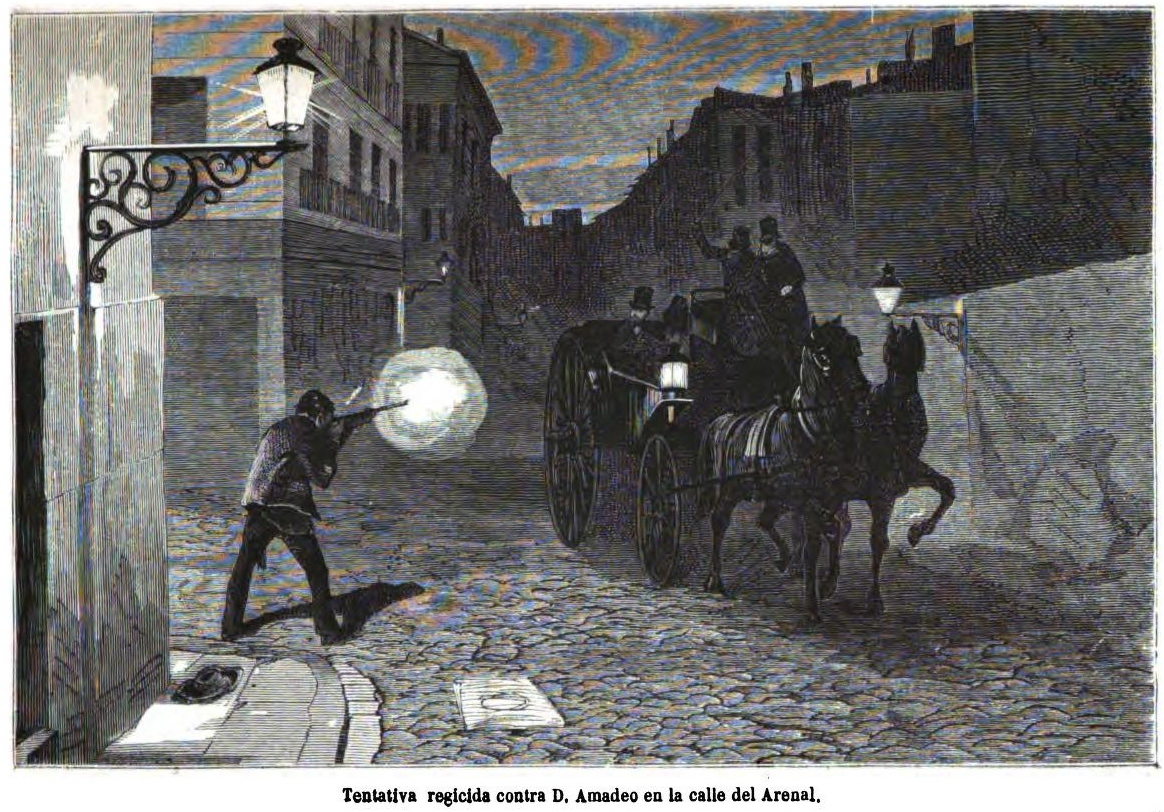
Assassination attempt on Amadeo I, 18 July 1872, Calle del Arenal.

On 18 July, Amadeo and Queen Maria Vittoria survived an assassination attempt on Madrid's Calle del Arenal, intensifying his isolation as a Radical-dependent king. Warned by Martos and Governor Pedro Mata, Amadeo refused to alter his route; Mata's agents arrested Republican federalist attackers after they fired. Francesc Pi i Margall defended them in court. Public humiliations followed: carriage attacks on Calle de Alcalá, mud-throwing on Cedaceros, insults near El Retiro, and aristocratic snubs like the "mantillas" incident.

===== August 1872 elections and their consequences =====
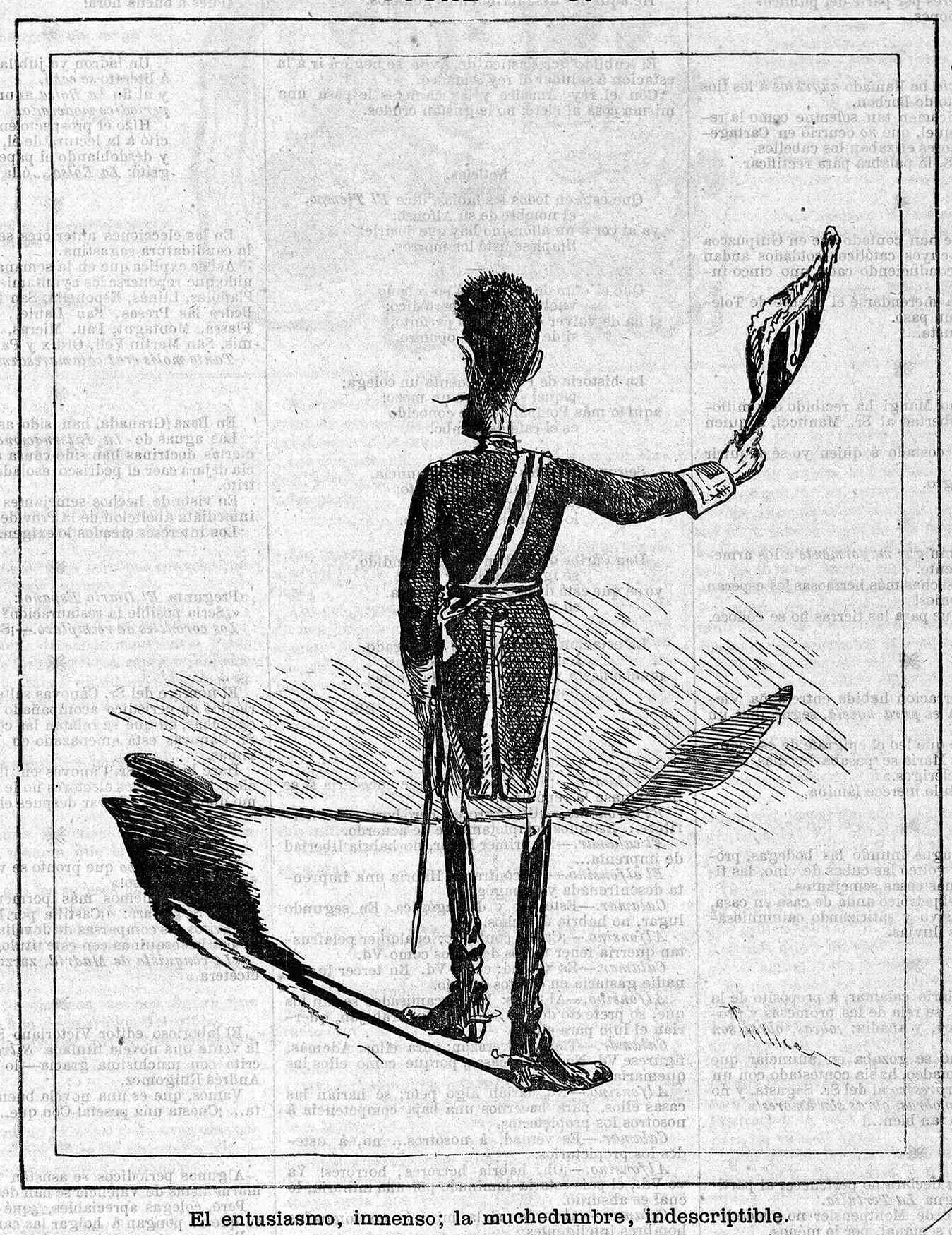
Caricature of Amadeo I, Gil Blas, 4 August 1872, by Josep Lluís Pellicer.

The 24 August elections saw Radicals propose jury trials, abolishing conscription and Matrícula de mar, church-state separation, public education, and militia strengthening to fulfill 1868 promises to the working classes. The Constitutional Party debated participation—opting in on 5 July to block a Republic—but fielded few candidates amid defeatism, with Serrano refusing to run, weakening the dynasty's conservative pillar. Topete, Sagasta, and Antonio de los Ríos Rosas led instead. Radicals won 274 seats, with 77 Republicans, 14 Constitutionalists, and 9 Moderates, aided by a Radical-Republican pact and over 50% abstention from boycotts and apathy.

Vilches notes the elections discredited the 1868 Revolution among conservatives, shifting the regime leftward via illegalities, sidelining Constitutionalists, and aligning Amadeo with Radicals, prompting Bourbon restoration talk for Alfonso XII. Montpensier's 20 June letter endorsed Alfonso as a progressive heir, gaining traction with Cánovas's liberal Moderates.

===== Abolition of slavery project in Puerto Rico =====
On 15 September, Ruiz Zorrilla's reform program passed only the Criminal Procedure Law. The abolition of slavery in Spain in Puerto Rico—immediate abolition, provincial regime, and split civil-military authority—split the cabinet. Overseas Minister Gasset y Artime and Finance Minister Ruiz Gómez resigned, replaced by Tomás María Mosquera, who presented himself on 24 December, backed by Republicans and the Sociedad Abolicionista Española. Cuba's abolition was deferred due to pressure from the Centro Hispano Ultramarino. Conservatives feared destabilising Puerto Rico and encouraging Cuban rebels, while Radicals saw it as a peace gesture. Opposition from the National League, including Serrano and Cánovas, sought a conservative government to halt reforms without toppling the regime.

===== Halted reforms and division Among the radicals =====
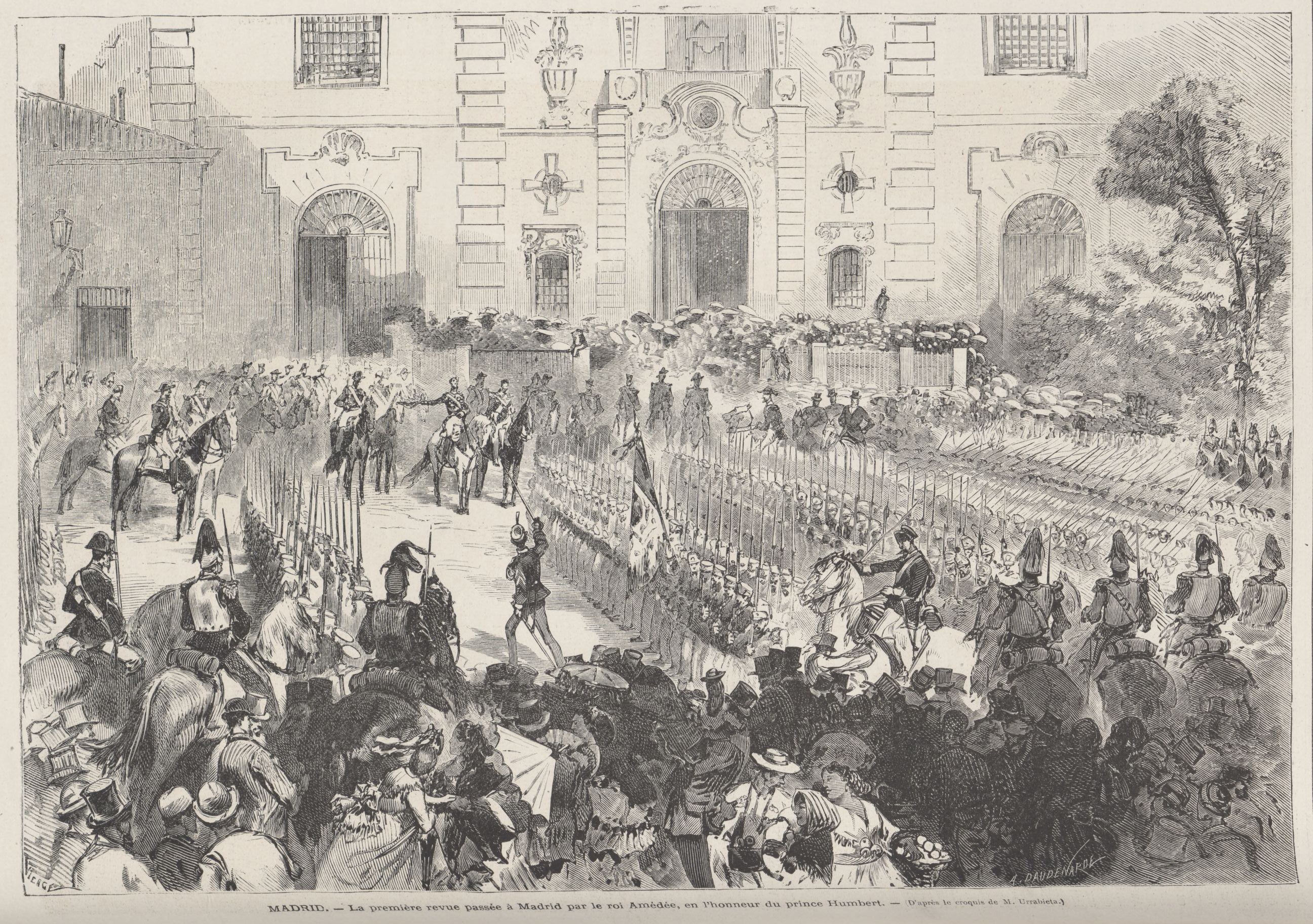
Amadeo I reviewing troops, September 1871, by Daniel Vierge

Under Manuel Ruiz Zorrilla's second government, ongoing conflicts—the Third Carlist War and Cuban War—blocked his pledge to abolish military drafts. Announcing a new recruitment in late 1872 sparked riots in several cities, emboldening "intransigent" federal Republicans to push their insurrectionary agenda. The most significant revolt erupted on 11 October in Ferrol, but it collapsed due to a lack of local support and no nationwide echo. "Benevolent" Republican leaders, like Francesc Pi i Margall, condemned it in the Cortes on 15 October as a "true crime" given "fully guaranteed" freedoms, deepening the party's split between legalists and insurrectionists—a rift only the Republic's proclamation four months later averted from escalating further.

The Carlist War intensified in December 1872, again delaying draft abolition. Republicans rejected Ruiz Zorrilla's policies, with minor Andalusian rebel groups forming, though less threatening than Carlists. Amid this turmoil, Ruiz Zorrilla tried to mend ties with the Constitutional Party by proposing ordinary courts, not the Senate, to judge Sagasta for the "two million reales scandal." This backfired as democratic deputies, led by Congress Speaker Nicolás María Rivero, and ministers Cristino Martos and José Echegaray, sided with Republicans to reject it. This internal rift bolstered "benevolent" Republicans' strategy to lure ex-Democrats (Cimbrios) into a parliamentary majority to topple the monarchy.

=== Abdication of Amadeo I and proclamation of the Republic ===
==== Conflict between radicals and the King ====
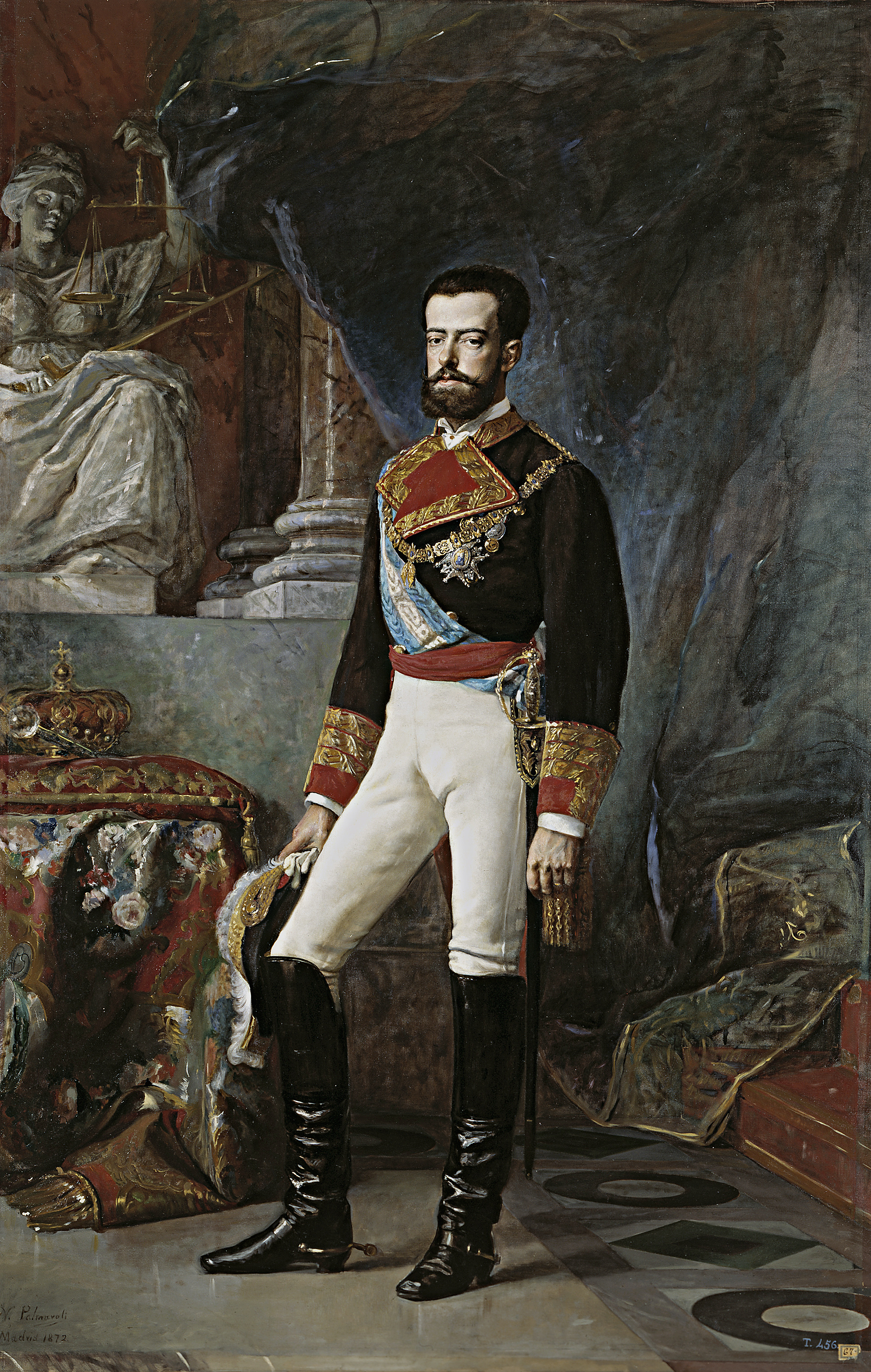
Amadeo I

On 29 January 1873, radical extremists seized on a perceived royal slight—Amadeo delaying his newborn heir's baptism due to childbirth complications, leaving government officials waiting—as a pretext to challenge him. Rumors swirled of Amadeo dismissing Ruiz Zorrilla for a Constitutionalist government, fueled by his meeting with General Serrano at the palace (Serrano declined after consulting his party). Radicals moved to declare the Cortes a permanent Convention, only halted by swift government action; the Chamber merely noted the prince's birth without fanfare. Amadeo told Ruiz Zorrilla he wouldn't "suffer impositions" and was "prepared to act," writing his father in early February of abdication thoughts, suspecting Ruiz Zorrilla colluded with Republicans against the dynasty.

A decisive clash emerged over artillery corps reorganisation. In January, officers threatened mass resignation if General Baltasar Hidalgo de Quintana—linked to the 1866 Uprising at the San Gil barracks suppression—remained Captain General of the Basque Country. The government and Cortés upheld civilian supremacy, affirming Hidalgo and reorganising the corps, prompting officers to resign en masse. On 6 February, these officers urged Amadeo to intervene, offering coup support to dissolve the Cortes and suspend guarantees. He refused but opposed the reorganization.

That day, Ruiz Zorrilla denied press reports of Hidalgo's appointment as Captain General of Catalonia, but its confirmation the next day convinced Amadeo of deceit. He pressed Ruiz Zorrilla on 7 February to delay the artillery issue and retain officers amid the Carlist War, but the Cortes approved their resignations and replacements by sergeants that evening, ratified by the Senate on 8 February. Moderate Fernando Calderón Collantes warned it undermined royal prerogatives, a view Amadeo shared as officers surrendered weapons before he signed the decree.

Amadeo considered a Constitutionalist government and Cortes dissolution but feared civil war, lacking Radical-controlled Madrid garrison support despite backing from generals like Topete, Serrano, and Malcampo. Topete offered Constitutionalist aid on 7–8 February, but Amadeo refused bloodshed, signing the artillery decrees on 8 February after a Council of Ministers meeting. He proposed a reconciliation government with all 1870 supporters, warning of abdication otherwise. Ruiz Zorrilla's cabinet rejected it after three meetings. On 9 February, Constitutionalists telegrammed Serrano in Jaén to return; he arrived 10 February, ready to defend the dynasty, but La Correspondencia de España announced Amadeo's abdication that day.

==== Abdication ====
Amadeo signed the artillery decree on 9 February and abdicated on 10 February 1873, notifying the Cortes on 11 February:

"For over two years I have worn the Crown of Spain... Spain lives in constant struggle... all who aggravate the nation's suffering are Spaniards... Amid this clamour, it is impossible to find a remedy... I have sought it within the law, and not found it... No danger would compel me to lay down the crown if it were for Spain's good... I hold the firm conviction that my efforts would be futile... These are the reasons I return the crown... renouncing it for myself, my children, and my successors."

Only Topete, a key 1868 revolutionary turned loyalist, bid farewell to Amadeo and Maria Vittoria dal Pozzo. Jorge Vilches blames Ruiz Zorrilla's Radicals for distorting the Crown's role, undermining a loyal party system, and empowering anti-monarchists, though Sagasta's hesitation and Serrano's reluctance also contributed to the collapse.

==== Proclamation of the Republic ====
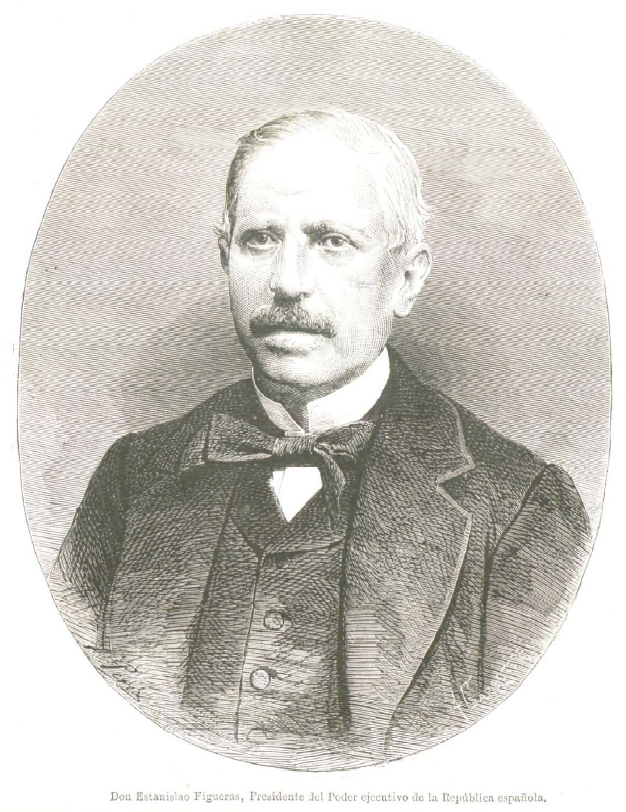
Estanislao Figueras, first President of the First Spanish Republic

On 10 February, Madrid federalists demanded the Republic as news of the abdication broke. Ruiz Zorrilla's cabinet split: Progressives favoured a provisional government and consultation, aligning with Constitutionalists, while Democrats, led by Martos and Rivero, pushed for a Cortes Convention to declare the Republic, leveraging their majority with federalists. Ruiz Zorrilla sought a 24-hour session suspension, but Martos overruled him, declaring the Cortes sovereign post-abdication, with "no other possibility but the Republic." The Cortes voted itself permanent, despite crowd pressure quelled by the National Militia.

On 11 February, Republican threats of insurrection by 3 p.m. forced action. Martos, Rivero, and Senate President Figuerola convened both chambers as a National Assembly. After reading Amadeo's letter, Martos ceded government power to the Cortes, which, with 258 votes to 32, proclaimed the First Spanish Republic:

"The National Assembly assumes all powers and declares the Republic as the form of government..."

That evening, Estanislao Figueras was elected President of the Executive Power, heading a Radical-Republican cabinet: Republicans Emilio Castelar (State), Francesc Pi i Margall (Interior), Nicolás Salmerón (Justice); Radicals José Echegaray (Finance), Manuel Becerra (Public Works), Francisco Salmerón (Overseas), General Fernández de Córdoba (War), and Admiral Beránger (Navy). Martos became Assembly president with 222 votes to Rivero's 20.

== Later life ==
Completely disgusted, the ex-monarch left Spain and returned to Italy, where he resumed the title of Duke of Aosta. The First Spanish Republic lasted less than two years, and in November 1874 Alfonso XII, the son of Isabella II, was proclaimed king, with Antonio Cánovas del Castillo, Spanish intermittent prime minister from 1873 until his assassination in 1897, briefly serving as regent.

Amadeo married his first wife, Maria Vittoria dal Pozzo, on 30 May 1867, with whom he had three sons; Prince Emanuele Filiberto, Duke of Aosta, Prince Vittorio Emanuele, Count of Turin, and Prince Luigi Amedeo, Duke of the Abruzzi. She died on 8 November 1876. On 11 September 1888, he married his French niece, Princess Maria Letizia Bonaparte, Duchess of Aosta (20 November 1866 – 25 October 1926), daughter of his sister Maria Clotilde and of Prince Napoléon Bonaparte, a nephew of Napoleon I. They had one child, Umberto (1889–1918), who died of the Spanish flu during the First World War, predeceasing all three of his half-brothers.

Amadeo remained in Turin until his death on 18 January 1890. His friend Puccini composed the famous elegy for string quartet Crisantemi in his memory.

== Legacy ==
The Philippine municipality of Amadeo, in the province of Cavite, was named after Amadeo I when it was established during his reign by Governor-General Rafael Izquierdo y Gutiérrez on 15 July 1872. At the time, the Philippines was a colony of Spain, forming part of the Spanish East Indies as the Captaincy General of the Philippines.

A large salt lake, Lake Amadeus, and the subsequently-named Amadeus Basin, where it lies in central Australia, is also named after Amadeo I by the explorer Ernest Giles, who was the first European to encounter the lake, in 1872.

== Honours and arms ==
=== National ===
- Italy:
  - Knight of the Supreme Order of the Most Holy Annunciation, 27 September 1862
  - Grand Cross of the Order of Saints Maurice and Lazarus, 27 September 1862
  - Grand Cross of the Order of the Crown of Italy, 27 September 1862
  - Gold Medal of Military Valour, 5 December 1866
- Spain: Grand Cross of the Order of Charles III, with Collar, 28 November 1866

=== Foreign ===
- (Austrian Empire) (Kingdom of Hungary) Austria-Hungary: Grand Cross of the Royal Hungarian Order of Saint Stephen, 1875
- Belgium: Grand Cordon of the Order of Leopold (civil), 5 September 1863
- Denmark: Knight of the Order of the Elephant, 19 August 1863
- Empire of Japan: Grand Cordon of the Supreme Order of the Chrysanthemum, 11 September 1882
- Monaco: Grand Cross of the Order of Saint-Charles, 27 April 1875
- Kingdom of Prussia:
  - Knight of the Order of the Black Eagle, 13 March 1867
  - Grand Commander's Cross of the Royal House Order of Hohenzollern, 10 March 1881
- Russian Empire: Knight of the Order of Saint Andrew the Apostle the First-called, 1879
- Sweden-Norway:
  - Knight of the Royal Order of the Seraphim, 2 August 1863
  - Grand Cross of the Royal Norwegian Order of Saint Olav, 28 December 1872

=== Arms ===
Coat of arms as Duke of Aosta (1845–1890)

Coat of arms as King of Spain (1871–1873)

== Issue ==
By Maria Vittoria dal Pozzo:

1. Prince Emanuele Filiberto, Duke of Aosta (13 January 1869 – 4 July 1931), Marshal of Italy, married to Princess Hélène of Orléans and had issue, including Prince Aimone who was briefly King Tomislav II of Croatia.
2. Prince Vittorio Emanuele, Count of Turin (24 November 1870 – 10 October 1946), died unmarried.
3. Prince Luigi Amedeo, Duke of the Abruzzi (29 January 1873 – 18 March 1933), Vice Admiral in the Italian Royal Navy, died unmarried.

By Maria Letizia Bonaparte:

1. Prince Umberto, Count of Salemi (22 June 1889 – 19 October 1918), died of the Spanish flu during World War I.

== Ancestry ==
Ancestors of Amadeo I of Spain

8. Charles Emmanuel, Prince of Carignano
4. Charles Albert of Sardinia
9. Princess Maria Christina of Saxony
2. Victor Emmanuel II of Italy
10. Ferdinand III of Tuscany
5. Archduchess Maria Theresa of Austria
11. Princess Luisa of Naples and Sicily
1. Amadeo I of Spain
12. Leopold II, Holy Roman Emperor
6. Archduke Rainer of Austria
13. Infanta Maria Luisa of Spain
3. Archduchess Adelaide of Austria
14. Charles Emmanuel, Prince of Carignano (= 8)
7. Princess Elisabeth of Savoy
15. Princess Maria Christina of Saxony (= 9)

== Bibliography ==
- Bahamonde, Ángel (1996). España en democracia. El Sexenio, 1868–1874 [Spain in Democracy. The Sexenio, 1868-1874] (in Spanish). Madrid: Historia 16-Temas de Hoy. ISBN 84-7679-316-2.
- Fontana, Josep (2007). La época del liberalismo. Vol. 6 de la Historia de España, dirigida por Josep Fontana y Ramón Villares [The Era of Liberalism. Vol. 6 of the History of Spain, directed by Josep Fontana and Ramón Villares] (in Spanish). Barcelona: Crítica/Marcial Pons. ISBN 978-84-8432-876-6.
- López-Cordón, María Victoria (1976). La revolución de 1868 y la I República [The Revolution of 1868 and the First Republic] (in Spanish). Madrid: Siglo XXI. ISBN 84-323-0238-4.
- Nieto, Alejandro (2021). La Primera República Española. La Asamblea Nacional: febrero-mayo 1873 [First Spanish Republic. The National Assembly: 1873 February–May] (in Spanish). Granada: Comares. ISBN 978-84-1369-237-1.
- Vilches, Jorge (2001). Progreso y Libertad. El Partido Progresista en la Revolución Liberal Española [Progress and Liberty: The Progressive Party in the Spanish Liberal Revolution] (in Spanish). Madrid: Alianza Editorial. ISBN 84-206-6768-4.

Amadeo I of Spain House of Savoy Born: 30 May 1845 Died: 18 January 1890
Regnal titles
Preceded by Francisco Serrano as Regent	King of Spain; 1870–1873	Vacant Republic declared Title next held by Alfonso XII
Italian nobility
Vacant Title last held by Vittorio Emanuele	Duke of Aosta; 1845–1890	Succeeded by Emanuele Filiberto
