= Francisco Salmerón =

Spanish painter

Francisco Salmerón (1608–1632) was a Spanish painter of the Baroque period.

Born in Cuenca, he was a pupil of Pedro Orrente, and followed his brother, the prominent Cristobal Garcia Salmerón (1603–1666), also a pupil of Orrente. Francisco painted in the church of San Francisco at Cuenca a Burial of Christ.
