= Reano =

- Comune
- Comune di Reano
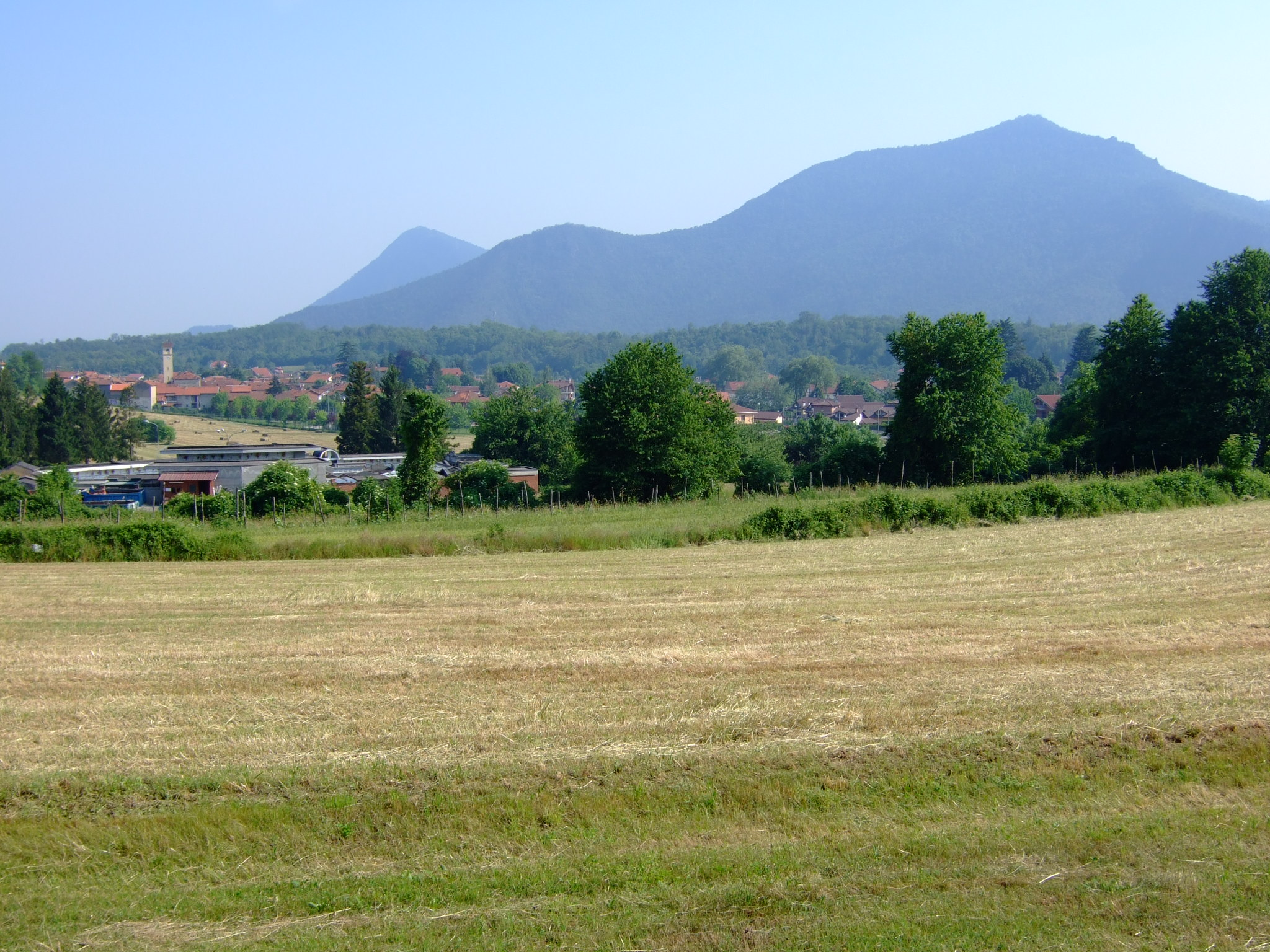

- Coat of arms

- Location within Italy Location within Piedmont
- Coordinates: 45°3′N 7°26′E
- Country: Italy
- Region: Piedmont
- Metropolitan city: Turin (TO)

Government
  - Mayor: Pietro Troielli

Area
  - Total: 6.6 km^{2} (2.5 sq mi)
- Elevation: 470 m (1,540 ft)

Population (31 December 2010)
  - Total: 1,688
  - Density: 260/km^{2} (660/sq mi)
- Demonym: Reanesi
- Time zone: UTC+1 (CET)
  - Summer (DST): UTC+2 (CEST)
- Postal code: 10090
- Dialing code: 011

Reano is a comune (municipality) in the Metropolitan City of Turin in the Italian region Piedmont, located about 20 kilometres (12 mi) west of Turin.

Reano borders the following municipalities: Avigliana, Rosta, Buttigliera Alta, Villarbasse, Trana, and Sangano.
