= Princess Maria de la Esperanza of Bourbon-Two Sicilies =

Princess of Bourbon-Two Sicilies (1914–2005)

Princess Maria de la Esperanza
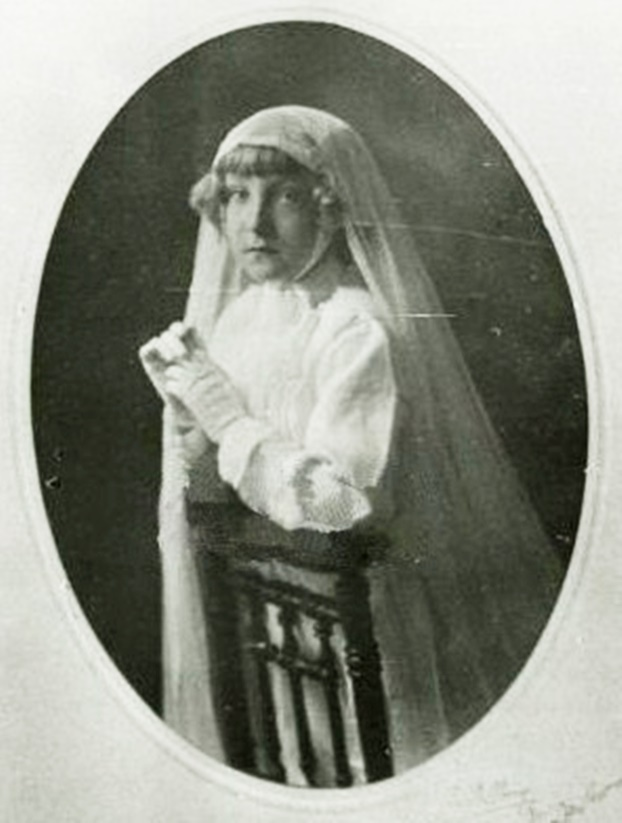
- Esperanza in 1922

Consort of the Head of the Imperial House of Brazil (disputed)
- Tenure: 18 December 1944 – 8 August 2005
- Born: 14 June 1914; Madrid, Spain
- Died: 8 August 2005 (aged 91); Villamanrique de la Condesa, Spain
- Burial: 9 August 2005; Church of San María Magdalena, Villamanrique
- Spouse: Prince Pedro Gastão of Orléans-Braganza (m. 1944)
- Issue Detail: Prince Pedro Carlos of Orléans-Braganza; Princess Maria da Glória; Prince Afonso; Prince Manuel; Princess Cristina; Prince Francisco
- House: House of Bourbon-Two Sicilies
- Father: Prince Carlos of Bourbon-Two Sicilies
- Mother: Princess Louise of Orléans

Maria de la Esperanza of Bourbon-Two Sicilies (Spanish: María de la Esperanza Amalia Raniera María Rosario Luisa Gonzaga de Borbón-Dos Sicilias y Orleáns; 14 June 1914 – 8 August 2005) was a member of the House of Bourbon-Two Sicilies. By marriage, she became the Princess of Orléans-Braganza and the consort of Prince Pedro Gastão of Orléans-Braganza, the head of the Petrópolis branch of the Brazilian Imperial Family. She was also the maternal aunt of King Juan Carlos I of Spain.

== Early life ==
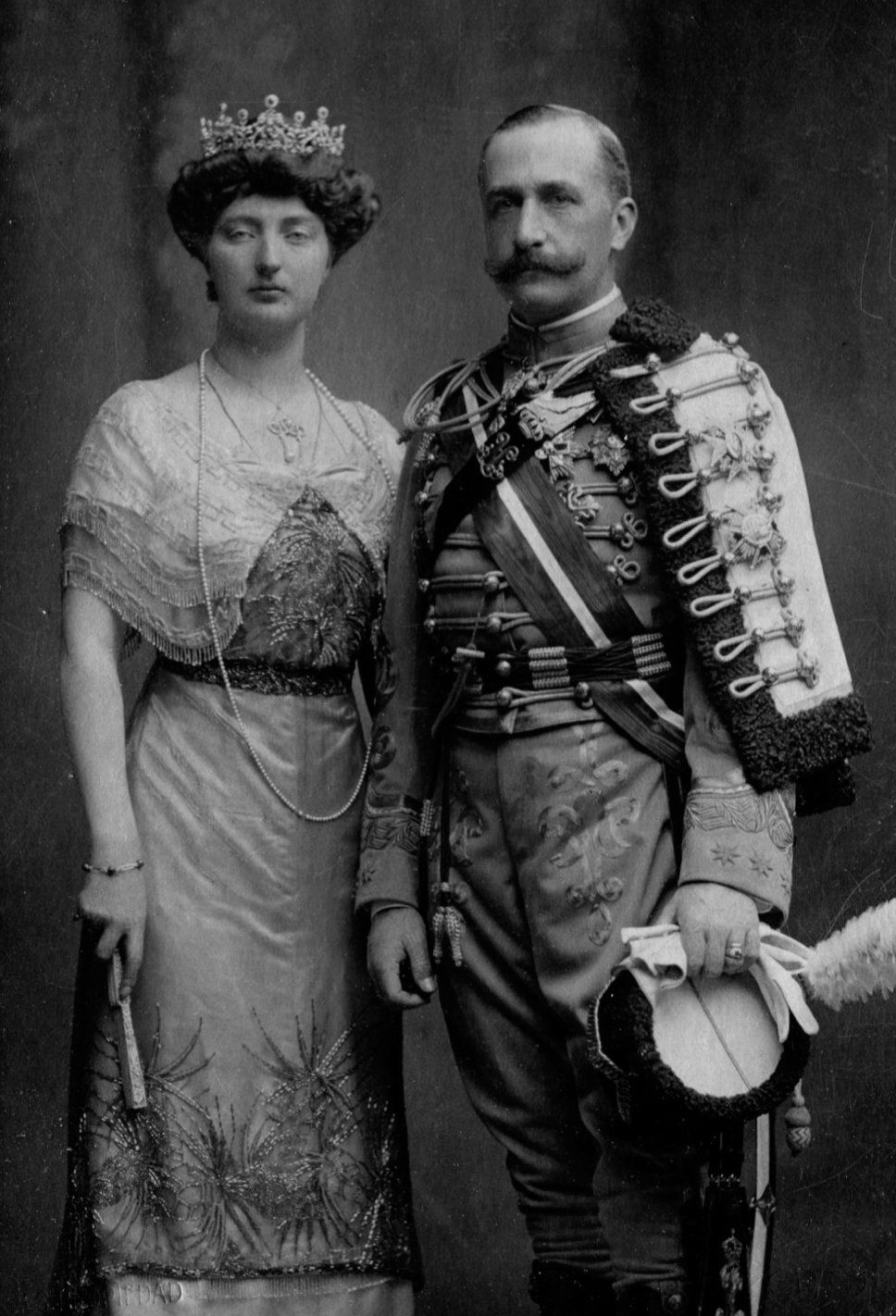
Esperanza's parents, Prince Carlos and Princess Carlos of Bourbon-Two Sicilies, photographed circa 1909

Princess Maria de la Esperanza was born in Madrid at 4:20 AM, during the period when her family was settled in Spain. Her father, Prince Carlos of Bourbon-Two Sicilies, had renounced his rights to the throne of the Two Sicilies to become an Infante of Spain upon his marriage to the Princess of Asturias. Her mother, Princess Louise of Orléans, was the daughter of Philippe, Count of Paris, the Orléanist pretender to the French throne.

She was baptized on 21 June 1914 in the Gasparini Room of the Royal Palace of Madrid (Note: As was customary for those Infantes of Spain who were not children of a reigning monarch, María de la Esperanza and her siblings enjoyed the honors, privileges, and distinctions of Infantes of Spain in accordance with the Royal Decree published on 6 August 1908) Her godparents were her maternal aunt, Queen Amélie of Portugal, (Note: Represented by her maternal grandmother, Marie Isabelle, Countess of Paris) and her paternal uncle, Prince Ranieri of Bourbon-Two Sicilies.

She was the youngest of four children. Her sister, Princess María de las Mercedes, married Infante Juan, Count of Barcelona, and became the mother of King Juan Carlos I. Following the proclamation of the Second Spanish Republic in 1931, the family went into exile, primarily residing in France and Italy.

== Marriage and issue ==
Styles of Princess Maria de la Esperanza of Bourbon-Two Sicilies
- Reference style: Her Royal Highness
- Spoken style: Your Royal Highness

On 18 December 1944, Maria de la Esperanza married her third cousin, Prince Pedro Gastão of Orléans-Braganza, in Seville, Spain. Pedro Gastão was the son of Prince Pedro de Alcântara of Orléans-Braganza and a claimant to the defunct Brazilian throne as head of the Petrópolis branch.

The couple had six children:

- Prince Pedro de Alcântara Carlos João Lourenço Miguel Rafael Gabriel of Orléans-Braganza (born 1945), who succeeded his father as head of the Petrópolis branch in 2007; He married twice and had issue from both.
- Princess Maria da Glória Henriqueta Dolores Lúcia Micaela Rafaela Gabriela of Orléans-Braganza (born 1947), former Crown Princess of Yugoslavia through her first marriage to Alexander, Crown Prince of Yugoslavia. Maria and Alexander are the parents of three sons: Peter, Philip, and Alexander.
- Prince Afonso Duarte Francisco Marcos Miguel Rafael Gabriel of Orléans-Braganza (born 1949).
- Prince Manuel Alvaro Rainiero Miguel Gabriel Rafael of Orléans-Braganza (born 1951).
- Princess Cristina Maria de Rosario Leopoldina Micaela Gabriela Rafaela of Orléans-Braganza (born 1953); She married Jean Sapieha-Rozanski and had issue.
- Prince Francisco Humberto Miguel Rafael Gabriel of Orléans-Braganza (born 1955); He married twice and had issue from both.

== Later life and death ==
Following the abolition of the Brazilian monarchy and her marriage to Prince Pedro Gastão of Orléans-Braganza, María de la Esperanza resided for several decades between Petrópolis in Brazil and her estates in Spain. Due to her status as the sister of the Countess of Barcelona, she maintained an intimate lifelong proximity to the Spanish royal family, frequently attending official state dynastic events at the Zarzuela Palace alongside her nephew, King Juan Carlos I.

In her final years, she retired fully from active dynastic duties, remaining at the Villamanrique de la Condesa estate near Seville. She died there on 8 August 2005 at the age of 91, and her funeral mass was attended by the Spanish royal court, led directly by King Juan Carlos I and Queen Sofía.

== Honors ==
- 4 March 1929: Dames 1173 of the Order of Queen Maria Luisa ( Kingdom of Spain).
- 18 February 1960: Dame Grand Cross of Justice of the Sacred Military Constantinian Order of Saint George ( (Kingdom of the Two Sicilies) Royal House of the Two Sicilies).

== Heraldry ==
Heraldry of Princess Maria de la Esperanza of Bourbon-Two Sicilies

Coat of Arms of Princess Maria de la Esperanza as Princess of Bourbon-Two Sicilies

Emblem of the alliance between the House of Bourbon-Two Sicilies and the House of Orléans-Braganza.

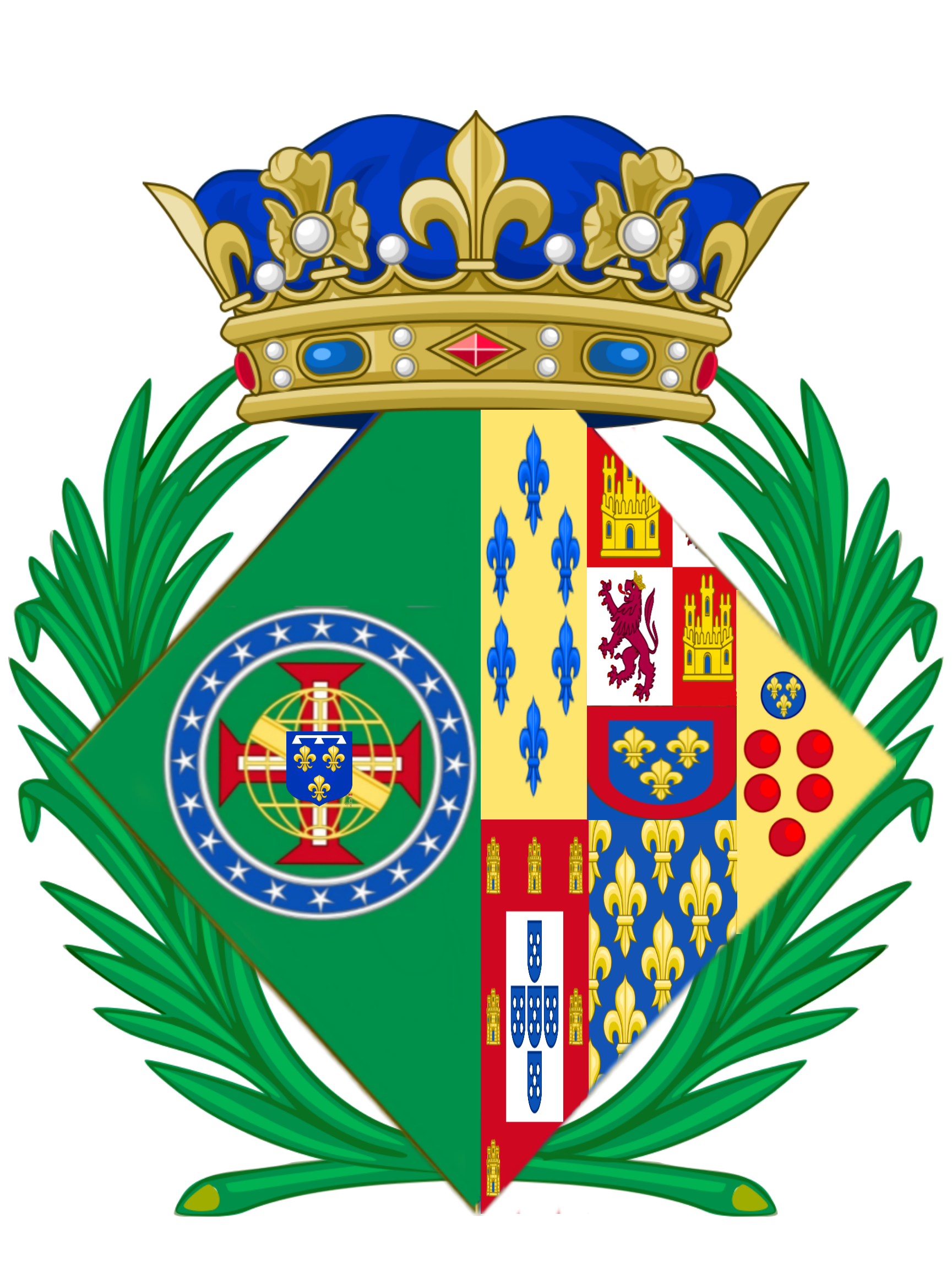
Coat of Arms of Princess Maria de la Esperanza as Princess of Orléans-Braganza

== Ancestry ==
Ancestors of Princess Maria de la Esperanza of Bourbon-Two Sicilies

8. King Ferdinand II of the Two Sicilies
4. Prince Alfonso, Count of Caserta
9. Archduchess Maria Theresa of Austria
2. Prince Carlos of Bourbon-Two Sicilies
10. Prince Francis, Count of Trapani
5. Princess Maria Antonietta of the Two Sicilies
11. Archduchess Maria Isabella of Austria
1. Princess María de la Esperanza of Bourbon-Two Sicilies
12. Prince Ferdinand Philippe, Duke of Orléans
6. Prince Philippe, Count of Paris
13. Duchess Helene of Mecklenburg-Schwerin
3. Princess Louise of Orléans
14. Prince Antoine, Duke of Montpensier
7. Princess Marie Isabelle of Orléans
15. Infanta Luisa Fernanda of Spain
