= Prince Ferdinand, Duke of Montpensier =

Ferdinand d'Orléans
- Duke of Montpensier
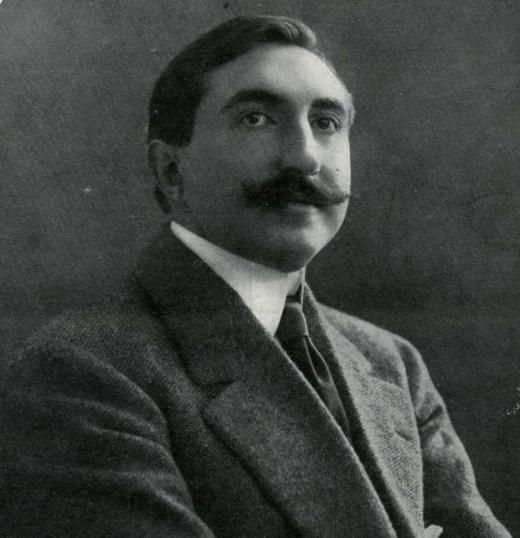
- Portrait of the Duke of Montpensier, 1920
- Born: 9 September 1884; Château d'Eu, Eu, Seine-Inférieure, French Republic
- Died: 30 January 1924 (aged 39); Château de Randan, Randan, Puy-de-Dôme, French Republic
- Burial: Chapelle royale de Dreux
- Spouse: María Isabel González de Olañeta e Ibarreta, 3rd Marchioness of Valdeterrazo (m. 1921)
- House: Orléans
- Father: Philippe, Count of Paris
- Mother: Marie Isabelle d'Orléans

Ferdinand d'Orléans, Duke of Montpensier (French: Ferdinand François Philippe Marie Laurent d'Orléans, Duc de Montpensier) (9 September 1884 – 30 January 1924) was a member of the House of Orléans and a Prince of France.

== Early life ==
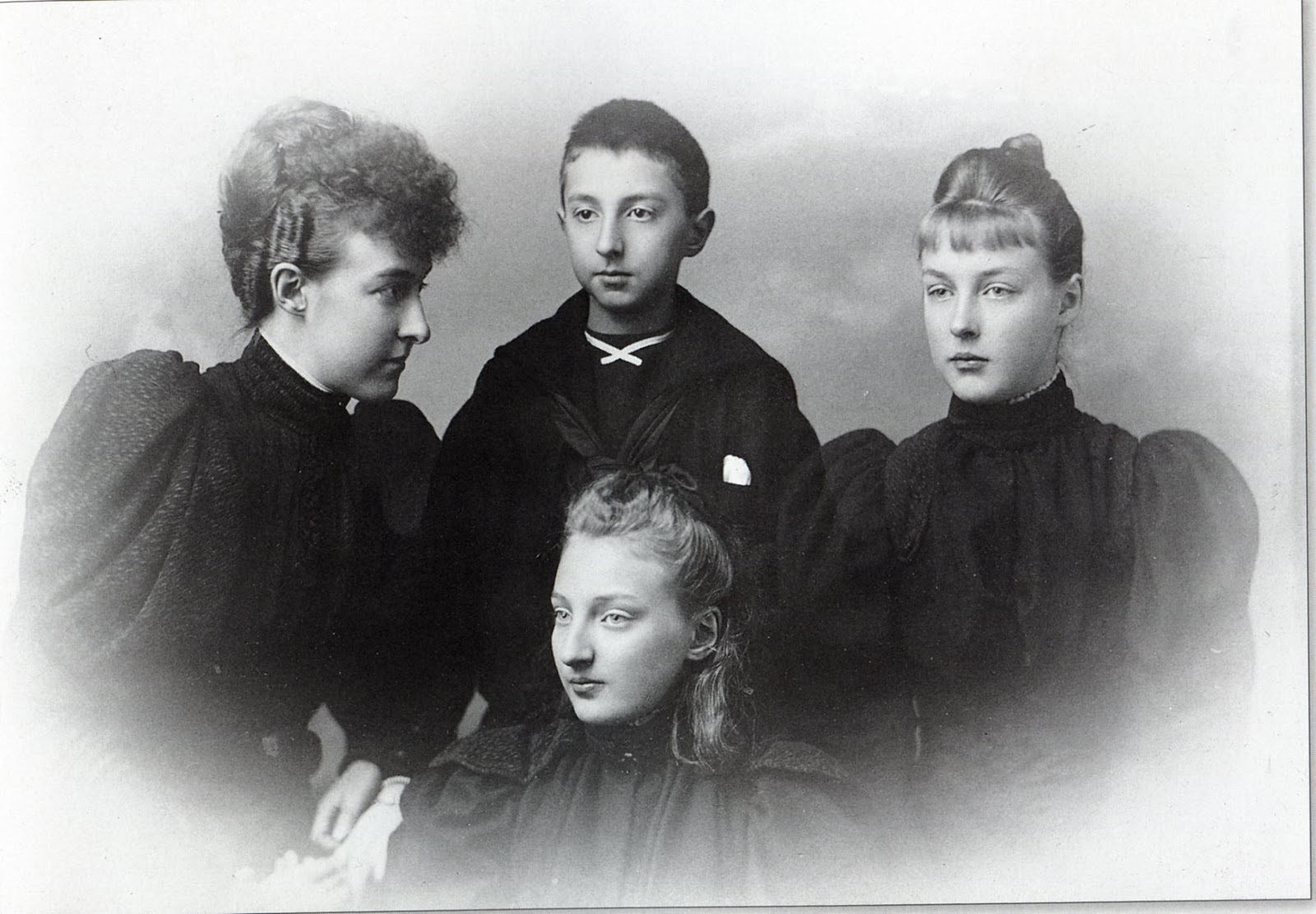
The Orleans siblings (from left to right): Princess Hélène (later Duchess of Aosta), Prince Ferdinand, Princess Isabelle (Later Duchess of Guise) and Princess Louise (later Princess of the Two-Sicilies, maternal grandmother of Spanish King Juan Carlos)

Ferdinand was born on 9 September 1884 at Château d'Eu, Eu, Seine-Inférieure, French Republic. He was the eighth, and youngest, child of Philippe d'Orléans, Count of Paris and his wife Marie Isabelle d'Orléans.

His elder siblings were Princess Amélie (wife of Carlos I of Portugal), Prince Philippe (who married Archduchess Maria Dorothea, daughter of Archduke Joseph Karl of Austria), Princess Hélène (the wife of Emmanuel Philibert, 2nd Duke of Aosta), Prince Charles (who died young), Princess Isabelle (wife of Prince Jean D'Orléans, Duke of Guise), Prince Jacques (who also died young), and Princess Louise (wife of Prince Carlos of Bourbon-Two Sicilies). His father reigned as King of the French for two days, from 24 February 1848 to 26 February 1848 until the monarchy was abolished, his family fled and the French Second Republic was proclaimed.

His paternal grandparents were Prince Ferdinand, Duke of Orléans and Duchess Helene of Mecklenburg-Schwerin. Through his father, he was a great-grandson of Louis-Philippe I, King of the French and his wife Queen Maria Amalia of the Two Sicilies.

His maternal grandparents were Infanta Luisa Fernanda of Spain and Prince Antoine, Duke of Montpensier (the youngest son of Louis-Philippe of France and Maria Amalia of Naples and Sicily).

== Career ==
The Duke lived in England for many years, until "his reported indiscretions with regard to his recollections of Queen Victoria made it somewhat uncomfortable for him when in London." When the Germans went into Belgium, he returned to London until World War I was over and then returned to Belgium.

In the fall of 1923, the French government bestowed upon him the Cross of Officer of the Legion of Honour for his services to his native land.

=== Albanian throne ===
In 1912, during the Congress of Trieste, he was proposed as a candidate for the Albanian throne. Others considered for the throne were Prince Ghika of Romania, Prince Karl, Duke of Urach, Prince Moritz of Schaumburg-Lippe, Prince Vittorio Emanuele, Count of Turin and Prince Arthur of Connaught.

== Personal life ==
On 20 August 1921, Ferdinand married Doña María Isabel González de Olañeta e Ibarreta (22 April 1895 – 11 July 1958), 3rd Marchioness of Valdeterrazo and Grandee of Spain, 2nd Viscountess of los Antrimes, at the Château de Randan in Randan, which he inherited from his mother. She was the daughter of Don Ulpiano González de Olañeta y González de Ocampo, 2nd Marquis of Valdeterrazo and Grandee of Spain, and his wife Doña Isabel de Ibarreta y Uhagón. Ferdinand and María Isabel did not have children.

The Duke of Montpensier died on 30 January 1924 at the Château de Randan in Randan in the French Republic.

== Ancestry ==
Ancestors of Prince Ferdinand, Duke of Montpensier

8. Louis Philippe I of France
4. Prince Ferdinand Philippe, Duke of Orléans
9. Princess Marie Amélie of Naples and Sicily
2. Prince Philippe, Count of Paris
10. Frederick Louis, Hereditary Grand Duke of Mecklenburg-Schwerin
5. Duchess Helene of Mecklenburg-Schwerin
11. Princess Caroline Louise of Saxe-Weimar-Eisenach
1. Ferdinand, Duke of Montpensier
12. Louis Philippe I of France (= 8)
6. Prince Antoine, Duke of Montpensier
13. Princess Marie Amélie of Naples and Sicily (= 9)
3. Princess Marie Isabelle of Orléans
14. Ferdinand VII of Spain
7. Infanta Luisa Fernanda of Spain
15. Princess Maria Christina of the Two Sicilies
