= Princess Marie Isabelle of Orléans =

Countess of Paris (1848–1919)

Marie Isabelle
- Countess of Paris
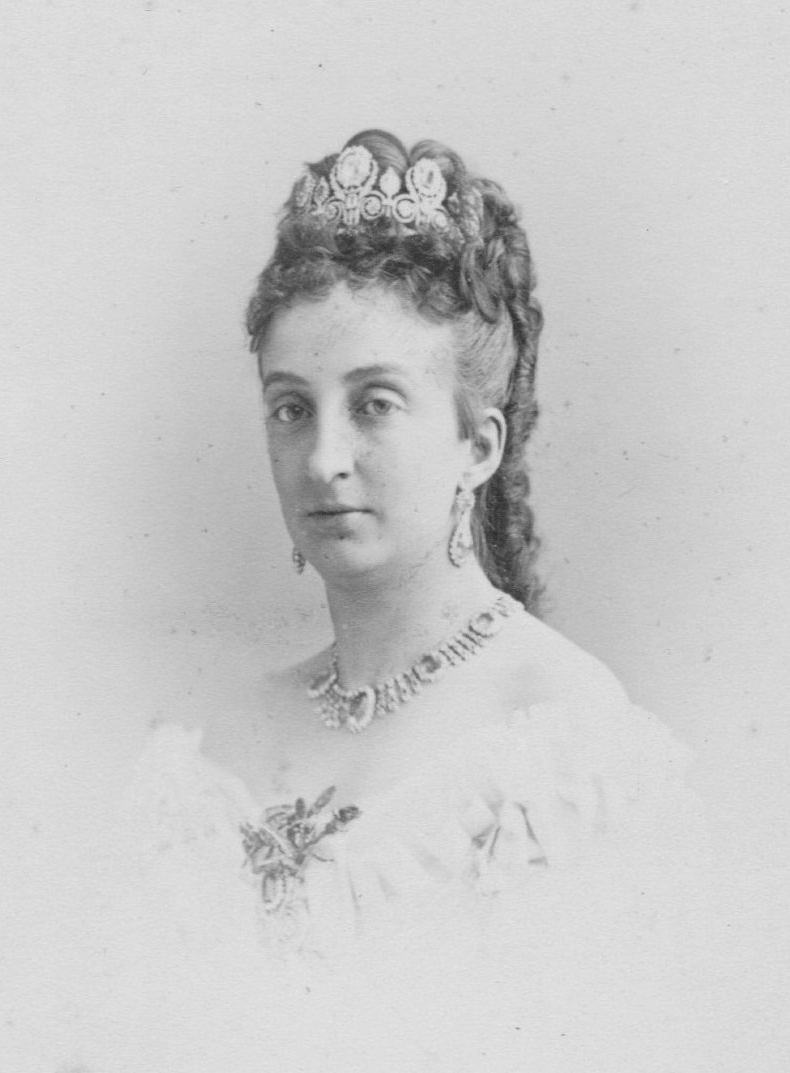
- Photograph, 1886

Consort of the Orléanist pretender to the French throne
- Pretendence: 30 May 1864 – 5 August 1873

Consort of the Unionist pretender to the French throne
- Pretendence: 24 August 1883 – 8 September 1894
- Born: 21 September 1848; Royal Alcázars of Seville, Seville, Spain
- Died: 23 April 1919 (aged 70); Palacio de Orléans, Villamanrique de la Condesa, Spain
- Burial: 13 May 1958; Chapelle royale de Dreux
- Spouse: Prince Philippe, Count of Paris (m. 1864; died 1894)
- Issue: Amélie, Queen of Portugal; Prince Philippe, Duke of Orléans; Princess Hélène, Duchess of Aosta; Princess Isabelle, Duchess of Guise; Louise, Princess Carlos of Bourbon-Two Sicilies; Prince Ferdinand, Duke of Montpensier
Names
- French: Marie Isabelle Françoise d’Asis Antoinette Louise Ferdinande Christine Amélie Philippine Adélaïde Joséphine Hélène Henriette Caroline Justine Rufine Gasparine Melchiore Baltassare Mâté d’Orléans; Spanish: María Isabel Francisca de Asís Antonia Luisa Fernanda Cristina Amelia Felipa Adelaida Josefa Elena Enriqueta Carolina Justina Rufina Gasparina Melchora Baltasara Matea
- House: Orléans
- Father: Prince Antoine, Duke of Montpensier
- Mother: Infanta Luisa Fernanda of Spain

Princess Marie Isabelle of Orléans (María Isabel de Orleans y Borbón; 21 September 1848 - 23 April 1919) was a Spanish infanta and French princess of the House of Orléans. She was the wife of Prince Philippe, Count of Paris, and as such was Countess of Paris and consort of the Orléanist/Unionist pretender to the French throne.

== Biography ==
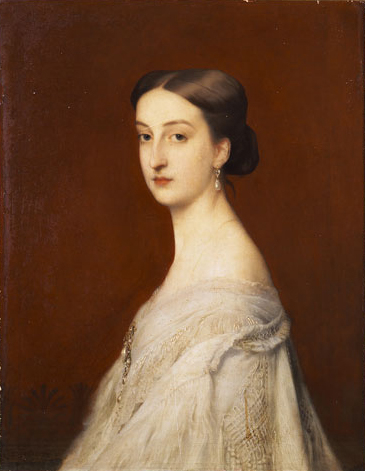
Portrait of Marie Isabelle of Orléans in 1865

She was born in Seville to Prince Antoine, Duke of Montpensier and Infanta Luisa Fernanda of Spain. Antoine was the youngest son of Louis Philippe I, the last King of France, and Maria Amalia of Naples and Sicily. Infanta Luisa was the daughter of Ferdinand VII of Spain and his fourth wife Maria Christina of the Two Sicilies. All four of her grandparents and seven of her eight great-grandparents were members of the French Royal House of Bourbon.

=== Marriage and issue ===
On 30 May 1864 at St. Raphael's Church in Kingston upon Thames, England, when she was only fifteen, Isabelle married her cousin Philippe d'Orléans, claimant to the French throne as Philippe VII. They had eight children:

- Princess Amélie of Orléans (1865–1951), married King Carlos I of Portugal in 1886 and had issue.
- Prince Philippe, Duke of Orléans (1869–1926), married Archduchess Maria Dorothea of Austria, daughter of Archduke Joseph Karl of Austria, in 1896.
- Princess Hélène of Orléans (1871–1951), married Prince Emanuele Filiberto, Duke of Aosta in 1895 and had issue.
- Prince Charles d'Orléans (1875–1875).
- Princess Isabelle of Orléans (1878–1961), married Prince Jean, Duke of Guise in 1899 and had issue.
- Prince Jacques d'Orléans (1880–1881).
- Princess Louise of Orléans (1882–1958), married Prince Carlos of Bourbon-Two Sicilies in 1907 and had issue, including Princess María de las Mercedes of Bourbon-Two Sicilies, she was the grandmother of King Felipe VI of Spain.
- Prince Ferdinand, Duke of Montpensier (1884–1924), married Marie Isabelle Gonzales de Olañeta et Ibaretta, Marquesa de Valdeterrazo in 1921.

As the French royal family had been in exile since their grandfather King Louis Philippe abdicated in 1848, Marie Isabelle and her husband first lived at York House, Twickenham in England. In 1871 the family was allowed to return to France, where they lived in the Hôtel Matignon in Paris and in the Château d'Eu in Normandy.

The Countess of Paris was known for her rather masculine habits of smoking cigars and participating in field sports, especially shooting, yet could surprise people with her elegance on formal occasions.

In 1886, they were forced to leave France for a second time. In 1894, her husband died in exile at Stowe House in Buckinghamshire. Marie Isabelle lived in the Château de Randan in France, and died in 1919 at her palace in Villamanrique de la Condesa, near Seville.

Princess Marie Isabelle of Orléans House of Orléans Cadet branch of the House of Bourbon Born: 21 September 1848 Died: 23 April 1919
Titles in pretence
Vacant Title last held by Maria Amalia of Naples and Sicily	— TITULAR — Queen consort of the French; 30 May 1864 – 5 August 1873; Reason for succession failure: French Revolution of 1848	Succeeded by Pretenders claim ended
Preceded by Maria Theresa of Austria-Este	— TITULAR — Queen consort of France; 24 August 1883 – 8 September 1894; Reason for succession failure: Dynasty deposed in 1830	Vacant Title next held by Maria Dorothea of Austria
