= Prince Pedro of Orléans-Braganza =

Prince Pedro of Orleans-Braganza may refer to:

- Prince Pedro de Alcantara of Orléans-Braganza (1875 - 1940), son of Isabel, Princess Imperial of Brazil and Gaston, comte d'Eu
- Prince Pedro Gastao of Orleans-Braganza (1913 – 2007), one of two claimants to the Brazilian throne as titular Emperor of Brazil
- Prince Pedro Henrique of Orleans-Braganza (1921 - 1981)
