= Le Soleil (French newspaper) =

- Type: Daily news
- Founder(s): Édouard Hervé and Jean-Jacques Weiss
- Founded: 1873
- Ceased publication: June 1915
- Political alignment: Monarchist
- Language: French
- Headquarters: Paris

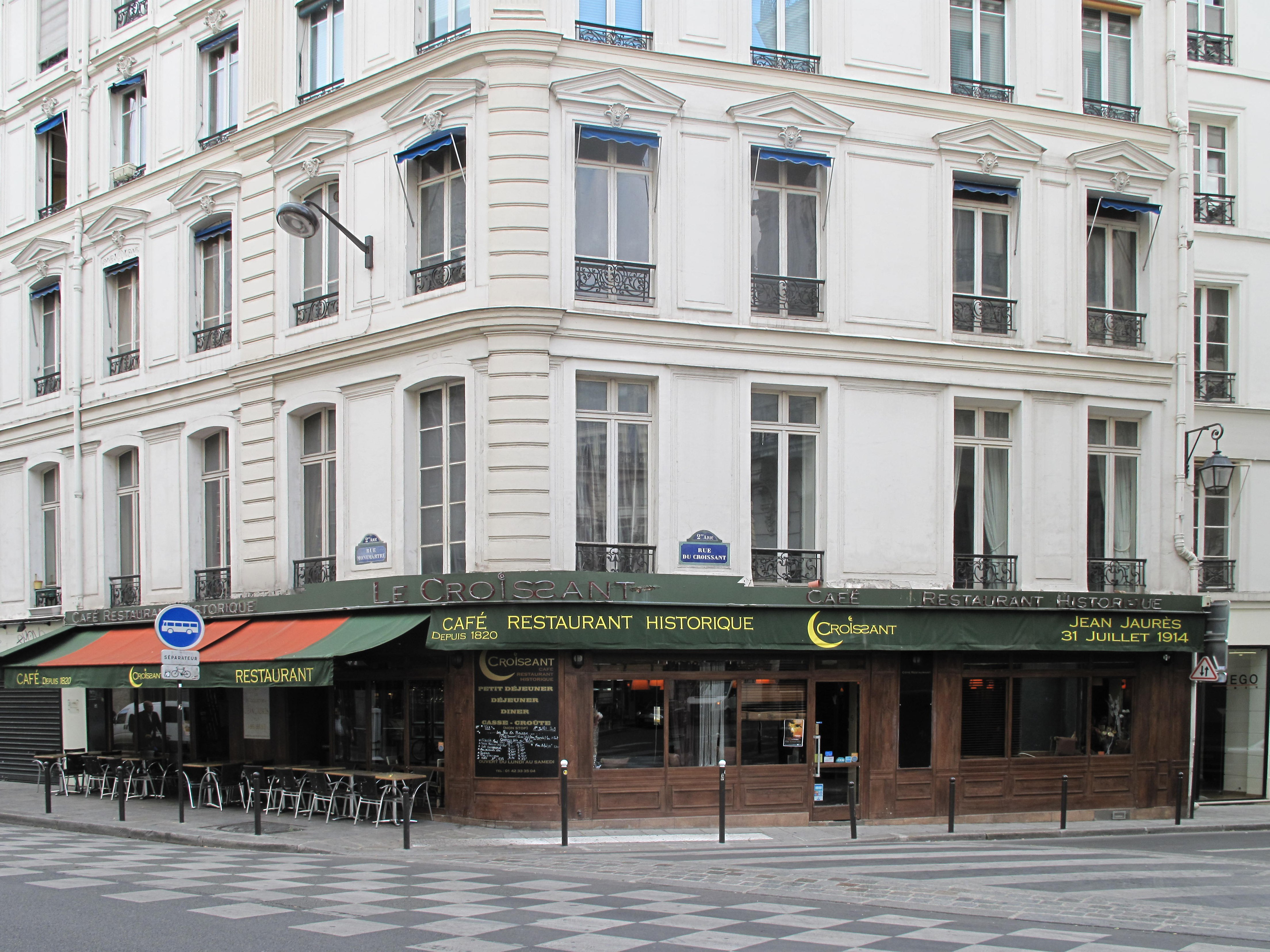
Café du Croissant, by the newspaper's offices

Le Soleil ("The Sun") was a French daily newspaper. It was founded in 1873 and run by the journalists Édouard Hervé and Jean-Jacques Weiss. Le Soleil was a monarchist daily, more moderate than others, sold for five centimes at the end of the nineteenth and start of the twentieth century. It was located in the rue du Croissant. It was one of two French newspapers that gave the best coverage of international news, along with Le Temps.

== History ==
The newspaper had two founders and editors, Jean-Jacques Weiss ( 1827 - 1891) and Édouard Hervé (1835 - 1899), friends who had worked together on the Orleanist and liberal Journal de Paris. They launched the first issue on 28 April 1867.

Édouard Hervé, a member of the French Academy since 1886, former adviser and friend of Prince Philippe, Count of Paris, was the owner-director of Le Soleil until his death in June 1899. He said, "I am Catholic, I even go to Church, but I do not want to serve it in my journal." Always holding liberal opinions in the Second Empire, he changed to monarchical views with the war of 1870, which soon became apparent from the tone of the articles of his team.

The newspaper hoped to help the merger of legitimists and Orléanists. It rapidly gaining a readership interested in international affairs, having refused to engage in supporting General Georges Boulanger. It was one of the papers that sent a reporter to Berlin for the German elections of 1887, while the German Continental Agency only gave out a little information on the subject.

Renowned for the quality of its articles, Le Soleil included among its editors the reporter Félix Dubois (1862 - 1945), Hugues Rebell (1867 - 1905) and Paul Bézine (1861 - 1928), one of the founders of the Association of Young Royalists in 1890, and founder of the anti-Masonic association Le Grand Occident de France, who in 1912 broke with the royalist party. In 1882 the daily columnist "Jean de Nivelles" (Charles Canivet) worked for the paper.

Le Soleil dropped from 40,000 to 25,000 copies in just one year, between 1898 and 1899, because its readers were baffled by the paper taking up the defense of Captain Alfred Dreyfus, while in general the royalists were against Dreyfus, which caused the departure of the royalist journalist Hervé de Kérohant. Disavowed by the Duke of Orleans, the newspaper passed first to Ambroise Rendu and then to Louis Numa Baragnon fils, who tried in vain to retain its old readers. Ambroise Rendu was a Paris municipal counsellor. In 1901 he bought Le Moniteur Universel. Le Soleil became a popular daily newspaper, costing only 5 centimes, but displeased many royalists by the tone of its articles. The newspaper closed down during World War I, in June 1915.

== Sources ==
- Bellanger, Claude (1969). Histoire générale de la presse française: De 1871 à 1940. Presses universitaires de France. p. 321. ISBN 9782130302582.
- "Édouard HERVÉ". Academie Francaise.
- "LE CAFÉ DU CROISSANT (D'après Les cafés artistiques et littéraires de Paris, paru en 1882)". Le Paris Pittoresque.
- Meunier, Georges (1894). Les critiques littéraires du dix-neuvième siècle: (études et extraits). C. Delagrave. p. 226.
- Palmer, Michael B. (1983). Des petits jornaux aux grandes agences: naissance du journalisme moderne 1863-1914. Aubier. p. 124. ISBN 978-2-7007-0346-7.
- Rebell, Hugues (1994). De mon balcon: recueil de chroniques et d'articles inédits, extraits des journaux, La Cocarde & Le Soleil. Libr. La Vouivre. ISBN 978-2-9506621-1-8.
- Rémond, René (1954). La droite en France de 1815 à nos jours: continuité et diversité d'une tradition politique. Aubier. p. 263.
- Saint-Martin, Yves T. (1986). "Félix Dubois (1862-1945)". Hommes et Destins Volume 7: Maghreb-Machrek (PDF). Paris: Académie des sciences d'outre-mer. pp. 92–99. ISBN 978-2-900098-13-4. Archived from the original (PDF) on 3 March 2016.
- Saint-Martin, Yves-Jean (1999). Félix Dubois: 1862-1945 : grand reporter et explorateur, de Panama à Tamanrasset. Editions L'Harmattan. ISBN 978-2-7384-8715-5.
