= Édouard Hervé =

French journalist, historian and politician (1835–1899)

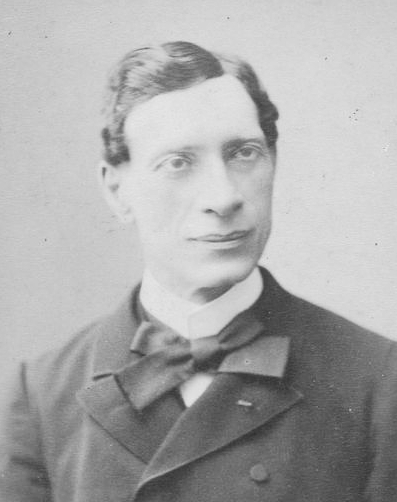
- Born: 28 May 1835; Saint-Denis, La Réunion. France
- Died: 4 January 1899 (aged 63); Paris, France
- Occupations: Journalist, Historian
- Known for: Founder of Le Soleil

Édouard Hervé (28 May 1835 – 4 January 1899) was a French journalist, historian and politician.

== Life ==
Édouard Hervé was born in Saint-Denis, La Réunion on 28 May 1835.

A graduate of the École Normale Supérieure, Paris city councilor and advisor to Philippe d'Orléans, Count of Paris (1838–1894), Hervé worked at several newspapers, including Le Journal de Genève (1865–1866) and L'Époque. In 1867, he founded the Journal de Paris. This newspaper was suppressed by the Paris Commune in 1871 when he wrote of the events of March: "The way the population of Paris yesterday expressed its satisfaction was more than frivolous, and we fear it gets worse with time. Paris now has a festive look that is totally inappropriate, and if we do not want to be called Parisians of decadence, we must put an end to this state of affairs. "

In 1873, Hervé founded Le Soleil, the first major daily newspaper priced at 5 centimes. With a monarchist viewpoint, publication was to continue until June 1915. Hervé became a member of the Paris municipal council. He belonged to both the Conférence Molé and the Conférence Tocqueville before their merger to form the Conférence Molé-Tocqueville.

Hervé is also the author of several historical works, which are actually compilations of his articles. He was made Chevalier of the Legion of Honour in 1873 and elected member of the Académie française on 11 February 1886.

Hervé died on 4 January 1899 in Paris.

== Historical works ==
- Une page de l'histoire d'Angleterre. Les Élections de 1868. Le Cabinet Gladstone. La Réforme de l'Église d'Irlande (1869)
- La Crise irlandaise, depuis la fin du dix-huitième siècle jusqu'à nos jours (1885)
- Trente Ans de politique, quelques articles et discours (1899)

== Sources ==
- "Édouard HERVÉ". Academie Francaise.
- Nagai, Nobuhito (2002), Les conseillers municipaux de Paris sous la troisième république, 1871-1914 (in French), Publications de la Sorbonne, ISBN 978-2-85944-440-2

Media related to Édouard Hervé at Wikimedia Commons
