= Amédée Thierry =

19th-century French historian

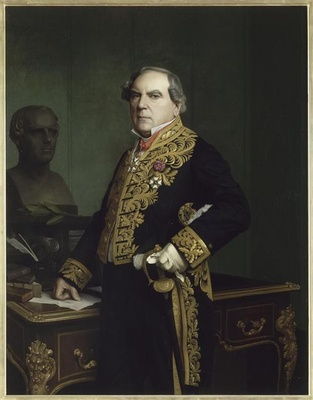
Amédée Simon Dominique Thierry.

Amédée Simon Dominique Thierry (2 August 1797, Blois, Loir-et-Cher – 27 March 1873, Paris), French journalist and historian, was the younger brother of Augustin.

== Biography ==
Amédée Thierry began life as a journalist (after an essay, like his brother, at schoolmastering). Connected with the romantic harbinger Globe, he obtained a small government clerkship. His first book was a brief history of Guienne in 1825, and three years later appeared the first volume of the Histoire des Gaulois, which was received with much favour, and obtained him, from the royalist premier Martignac, a history professorship at Besançon. He was, however, thought too liberal for the government of Charles X, and his lectures were stopped, with the result of securing him, after the revolution, the important post of prefect of the Haute-Saône, which he held eight years.

During this time he published nothing. In 1838 he was transferred to the council of state as master of requests, which post he held through the revolution of 1848 and the coup d'état till 1860, when he was made senator—a paid office, it must be remembered, and, in effect, a lucrative sinecure. He also passed through all the ranks of the Legion of Honour, became a member of the Academie des Inscriptions in 1841, and in 1862 received the honorary degree of D.C.L. at Oxford. He had, except during the time of his prefecture, never intermitted his literary work, being a constant contributor to the Revue des deux mondes, his articles (usually worked up afterwards into books) almost all dealing with Roman Gaul and its period.

== Works ==
- Histoire des Gaulois, 3 vols. (1828, 1834, 1845; the 8th edition of vol. i. appeared in 1870)
- Histoire de la Gaule sous l'administration romaine (3 vols., 1840–47; 2nd ed. 1871)
- Histoire d'Attila, de ses fils et successeurs jusqu'à l'établissement des Hongrois en Europe (1856; 5th ed. in 1874)
- Tableau de l'Empire romain (1862; 5th ed. in 1871; now quite out of date)
- Récits de l'histoire romaine au Ve siecle: la lutte contre les Barbares, et les luttes religieuses (1860; 2nd ed. in 6 vols. 1880).

His son, Gilbert Augustin Thierry (1843–1915), who began a literary career by articles on Les Révolutions d'Angleterre (1864) and some Essais d'histoire religieuse (1867), afterwards confined himself to the writing of novels.

The journalist and writer Charles Canivet was his secretary.
