= Charles Canivet =

French poet and writer (1839–1911)

Charles-Alfred Canivet (10 February 1839, in Valognes – 1911 ibid) was a 19th-century French poet, journalist, novelist, and storyteller.

A secretary by Amédée Thierry, he wrote a daily column for the Soleil under the pseudonym "Jean de Nivelle". After trying the theater, he left numerous literary works in the form of stories, novels and poems.

== Biography ==
Secretary to Amédée Thierry, he wrote a daily column for Le Soleil (French newspaper) under the pseudonym “Jean de Nivelle”. After trying his hand at theater, he left numerous literary works in the form of stories, novels and Poetry.

He died on November 29, 1911, at his home 13, rue de Savoie, and is buried in the Montmartre Cemetery with his wife Marie-Amélie Maurouard.

== Works ==
- 1863: Une Fauvette et deux merles, comedy in 1 act and in prose, Caen, E. Alliot;
- 1866: Chants libres, poésies, Caen, Legost-Clérisse;
- 1871: Histoires extravagantes, Paris, Mauger, Capart et Cie;
- 1875: La Prise de Sidney Smith en 1796, Paris, bureau du Journal de Paris;
- 1877: Jean Dagoury, Paris, E. Plon;
- 1878: Croquis et paysages, sonnets, Paris, A. Lemerre;
- 1879: Constance Giraudel, Paris, bureaux de la Presse;
- 1880: Nouveaux contes en vers et poésies variées, Paris, G. Chamerot;
- 1882: Pauvres diables, Paris, G. Charpentier;
- 1883: Le Long de la côte, Paris, A. Lemerre;
- 1884: Les Colonies perdues, Paris, Jouvet;
- 1885: La Nièce de l'organiste, Paris, E. Plon, Nourrit et Cie,;
- 1885: Les Hautemanière, Paris, P. Ollendorff;
- 1888: Pilote-Major, Paris, N. Martinet;
- 1888: La ferme des Gohel, Paris, C. Marpon et E. Flammarion;
- 1889: Contes de la mer et des grèves, Paris, Jouvet;
- 1889: Après la tempête, poésie, Paris, P. Mouillot;
- 1890: L'Amant de Rébecca, Paris, E. Plon, Nourrit et Cie;
- 1891: Lise Heurtevent, Paris, M. Dreyfous, 1891 (also published as a feuilleton in Le Figaro between 30 March 1891 and 2 June 1891);
- 1891: Contes du vieux pilote, Paris, Jouvet;
- 1891: Mademoiselle Maréchal ; La Petite Sœur ; L'Élection d'un maire, Paris, V. Havard;
- 1896: Enfant de la mer, Paris, E. Flammarion;
- undated: Fils de pêcheur, Paris, bureaux du Journal des voyages.
