= Pedro Gastão of Orléans-Braganza =

Pedro Gastão
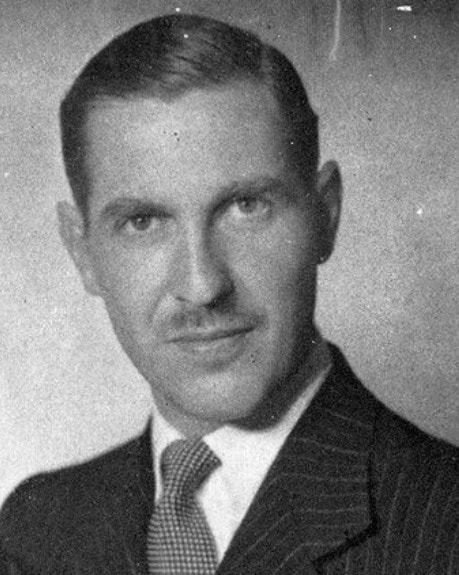
- Pedro Gastão in 1944

Head of the Imperial House of Brazil (disputed)
- Tenure: 29 January 1940 – 27 December 2007
- Predecessor: Pedro de Alcântara
- Successor: Pedro Carlos
- Born: 19 February 1913; Eu, Seine-Maritime, France
- Died: 27 December 2007 (aged 94); Villamanrique de la Condesa, Seville, Spain
- Spouse: Princess Maria de la Esperanza of Bourbon-Two Sicilies (m. 1944; died 2005)
- Issue: Pedro Carlos; Maria da Glória; Afonso; Manuel; Cristina; Francisco
Names
- Pedro de Alcântara Gastão João Maria Filipe Lourenço Humberto Miguel Gabriel Rafael Gonzaga de Orléans e Bragança
- House: Orléans-Braganza
- Father: Pedro de Alcântara, Prince of Grão-Pará
- Mother: Countess Elisabeth Dobrzensky of Dobrzenicz

Pedro Gastão of Orléans-Braganza (19 February 1913 – 27 December 2007) was a Brazilian prince and dynastic claimant who served as head of the Petrópolis branch of the House of Orléans-Braganza. From 1940 until his death, he claimed the symbolic headship of the former Brazilian throne, in opposition to the rival claim of the Vassouras branch led by his cousins Pedro Henrique and later Luiz.

Born during the exile of the Brazilian imperial family, Pedro Gastão was the second child and eldest son of Pedro de Alcântara, Prince of Grão-Pará, former heir apparent to the Brazilian throne, and Countess Elisabeth Dobrzensky of Dobrzenicz. He never accepted as valid his father’s 1908 renunciation of dynastic rights, which had been made in order to contract a non-dynastic marriage, and on this basis asserted his own claim to the imperial legacy following his father’s death in 1940.

Through his family ties, Pedro Gastão was closely connected to other former European ruling houses. He was the uncle of the pretenders to the thrones of Portugal (Duarte Pio, Duke of Braganza) and France (Henri, Count of Paris), and the grandfather of Philip, Hereditary Prince of Yugoslavia, heir apparent to the defunct Yugoslav throne.

== Early life ==
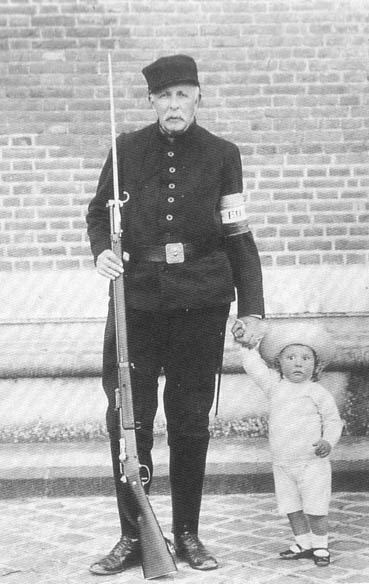
Prince Pedro Gastão with his grandfather Gaston, Count of Eu, 1915.

Pedro Gastão, whose name was after his father and grandfather, was born on 19 February 1913 in France in the Château d'Eu, at the homonymous town of Eu, Seine-Maritime, where the Brazilian Imperial Family was installed since 1905. His father, Pedro de Alcântara, Prince of Grão-Pará, was the older son of Isabel, Princess Imperial of Brazil, and had been expected from birth to eventually inherit the Imperial Throne of Brazil naturally. His mother, Countess Elisabeth Dobrzensky of Dobrzenicz, was a member of an old Bohemian noble family. He was brother to Isabelle, Countess of Paris, Maria Francisca, Duchess of Braganza, João Maria and Teresa Teodora.

Pedro Gastão spent his youth in Europe, largely at his family's Parisian home in the Boulogne sur Seine suburb: "I have very good memories of my grandparents [...] In exile in France I was always brought up thinking of Brazil not France or Portugal." In 1922 he saw Brazil for the first time, two years after the repeal of the Banishment Law against the Imperial Family. The family was repatriated and settled at the Imperial Palace of Grão-Pará, at the town of Petrópolis, where Pedro Gastão attended the Notre Dame de Sion school which rented his father's Palace of Petrópolis.

== Succession ==
Pedro Gastão with his sisters Isabelle, Countess of Paris (right), and Teresa Teodora, among those attending the public exhibition of the coffin of their ancestor, Emperor Pedro I of Brazil, at the Palace of São Cristóvão, Rio de Janeiro, 1972

When Pedro Gastão was born, it had been five years since his father had signed the instrument of resignation, by which he theoretically would have renounced the rights of succession to the throne of Brazil for himself and his offspring. The document was accepted by the Princess Imperial and by most royalists.

A few years before his death Pedro Gastão's father Prince Pedro de Alcântara told a Brazilian newspaper:

"My renunciation was not valid for many reasons: besides, it was not a hereditary renunciation."

Following the death of his father, and supported by Infante Alfonso, Duke of Calabria and Infante Juan, Count of Barcelona, Pedro Gastão declared himself Head of the Imperial House of Brazil. His position was supported by Francisco Morato, law professor at the University of São Paulo, who concluded the resignation of Pedro Gastão's father was not a valid legal or monarchical act. Professor Paulo Napoleão Nogueira da Silva in the 1990s published a report saying that the resignation of his father was invalid under all possible aspects of Brazilian Law.

He represented a rival claim to that of his cousin's son, Luiz of Orléans-Braganza, to be the heir of the deposed Emperor Pedro II of Brazil, despite the renunciation signed by his father in 1908 when he married, without dynastic approval, a Bohemian noblewoman.

Pedro Gastão died aged 94 on 27 December 2007.

His dynastic claim to the head of the imperial house is currently assumed by his male grandson Pedro Tiago of Orléans-Braganza (born 12 January 1979).

== Marriage and children ==
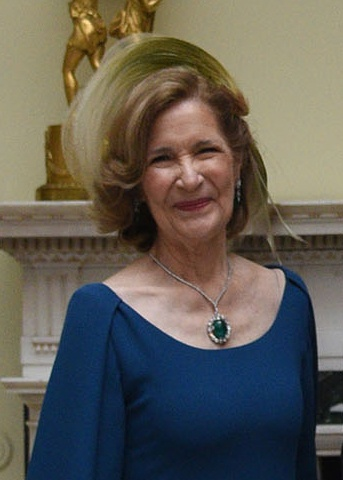
Pedro's eldest daughter: Princess Maria da Gloria of Orléans-Braganza, Duchess of Segorbe, former Crown Princess of Yugoslavia.

He married María de la Esperanza de Borbón y Orleans, Princess of the House of Bourbon (1914–2005), daughter of Carlos de Borbón y Borbón, infante of Spain, and Luisa de Orleans y Orleans, Infanta of Spain, the maternal aunt of John Charles I, King of Spain, on 18 December 1944 in Seville, Spain. They had six children:

- Pedro Carlos of Orléans-Braganza (born 31 October 1945), married Rony Kuhn de Souza (20 March 1938 – 14 January 1979) on 2 September 1975, with issue. He remarried Patricia Branscombe (22 November 1962 – 21 November 2009) on 16 July 1981, with issue. He married Patrícia Alvim Rodrigues, civilly, in 2018 and, religiously, on 9 October 2021.
  - Pedro Tiago of Orléans-Braganza (born 12 January 1979)
  - Felipe of Orléans-Braganza (born 31 December 1982)
- Maria da Gloria of Orléans-Braganza (born 13 December 1946), married Alexander, Crown Prince of Serbia on 1 July 1972, divorced in 1985, with issue. She remarried Ignacio de Medina y Fernández de Córdoba, 19th Duke of Segorbe on 24 October 1985, with issue:
  - Prince Peter of Serbia (born 1980)
  - Philip, Hereditary Prince of Serbia (born 1982), married Danica Marinković (born 1986) on 7 October 2017, with issue.
  - Prince Alexander of Serbia (born 1982), married Vesna Jelić on 20 September 2025, with issue.
  - Sol María de la Blanca Medina y de Orleans-Braganza, Countess of Ampurias (born 1986), married Pedro Domínguez-Manjón y Toro (of the Barons de Gracia Real) on 4 June 2023.
  - Ana Luna Medina y de Orleans-Braganza, Countess of Ricla (born 1988), married Giovanni Michele Rapazzini de' Buzzaccarini (born 1993), with issue
- Alfonso of Orléans-Braganza (born 25 April 1948), married María Juana Parejo y Gurruchaga (born 1954) on 3 January 1973, divorced with issue. He remarried Sylvia Amelia Senna de Hungria Machado on 19 November 2002.
  - Maria of Orléans-Braganza (born 1974), married Walter Santiago Estellano, has a son.
  - Julia of Orléans-Braganza (born 1977)
- Manuel of Orléans-Braganza (born 17 June 1949), married Margarita Haffner y Lancha (born 10 December 1945) on 12 December 1977, divorced in 1995, with issue. He remarried Elisa Ariza y Riobóo in 1995.
  - Luiza of Orléans-Braganza (born 1978)
  - Manuel of Orléans-Braganza (born 1981), married Cássia Letícia Ferreira Kerpel.
- Cristina of Orléans-Braganza (16 October 1950 — 15 May 2025), married Jan Paweł Sapieha-Rozanski (26 August 1935 – 6 August 2021) on 16 May 1980, sometime Belgian ambassador to Brazil divorced in 1988, with issue. She remarried José Carlos Calmon de Brito in October 1992, divorced in 1997.
  - Anna Teresa Sapieha-Rozanski (born 1981), married Benjamin Furlong, has a son.
  - Paola Sapieha-Rozanski (born 1983), married in 2012 Prince Constantin Nicolas "Tinko" Swiatopolk-Czetwertyński (born 1978)
- Francisco of Orléans-Braganza (born 9 December 1956), married Christina Schmidt-Peçanha (born 14 January 1953) on 28 January 1978, divorced, with issue. He remarried Rita de Cássia Pires in 1980, with issue:
  - Francisco of Orléans-Braganza (born 1979), married Mathieu Nyssens on 11 January 2023.
  - Gabriel of Orléans-Braganza (born 1989)
  - Manuela of Orléans-Braganza (born 17 November 1997), married on 21 April 2024 Henry Grossi Kappaun (born 21 May 1992). They are due to have a baby boy in March 2026

== Later years ==
=== Business ===
Pedro Gastão ran the Companhia Imobiliária de Petrópolis (Petrópolis Real Estate Company), that collected the laudemium fee, until the end of the 20th century. Still in the mountain town of Petrópolis, in the 1950s, he acquired the newspaper Tribuna de Petrópolis, founded in 1902, and currently managed by his son, Francisco. In 1954 he came to an agreement with his siblings for the definitive sale of the Château d'Eu to the Prefecture of Eu.

=== 1993 Brazilian constitutional referendum ===
In the early 1990s, during the referendum in which the Brazilian people should opt for the monarchy or the republic, Pedro Gastão was one of the most engaged in the campaign for the monarchy. But with the defeat of the cause, in advanced age, he eventually left the country and disallowed the initiative of some of his supporters to found a monarchist party in Brazil. He retired to his wife's property in Villamanrique-de-la-Condessa, near Seville, Spain.

=== Death ===
The couple's last years of life were spent at the princess's estate, where both died. Maria de la Esperanza died before him, in 2005, leaving him only with his caretakers and being constantly visited by two of his children who lived in Seville. Pedro Gastão died in the early hours of 27 December 2007, at the age of 94, and was buried the following day, in the chapel of Villamanrique de la Condesa. He received a State funeral with the presence of the Spanish monarchs.

== Ancestors ==
Ancestors of Pedro Gastão of Orléans-Braganza

8. Prince Louis, Duke of Nemours
4. Prince Gaston, Count of Eu
9. Princess Victoria of Saxe-Coburg and Gotha
2. Pedro de Alcântara, Prince of Grão-Pará
10. Pedro II of Brazil
5. Isabel, Princess Imperial of Brazil
11. Princess Teresa Cristina of the Two Sicilies
1. Prince Pedro Gastão of Orléans-Braganza
12. Baron Johann Nepomuk Dobrženský von Dobrženitz
6. Count Johann Wenzel Dobrženský von Dobrženitz
13. Baroness Marie Friederike Wanczura von Rzehnicz
3. Countess Elisabeth Dobrženský von Dobrženitz
14. Count Josef Kottulinsky von Kottulin und Krzizkowitz
7. Countess Elisabeth Kottulinsky von Kottulin und Krzizkowitz
15. Countess Adelheid von Attems-Heiligenkreuz
