= Princess Louise of Orléans =

Princess Louise
- Princess Carlos of Bourbon-Two Sicilies
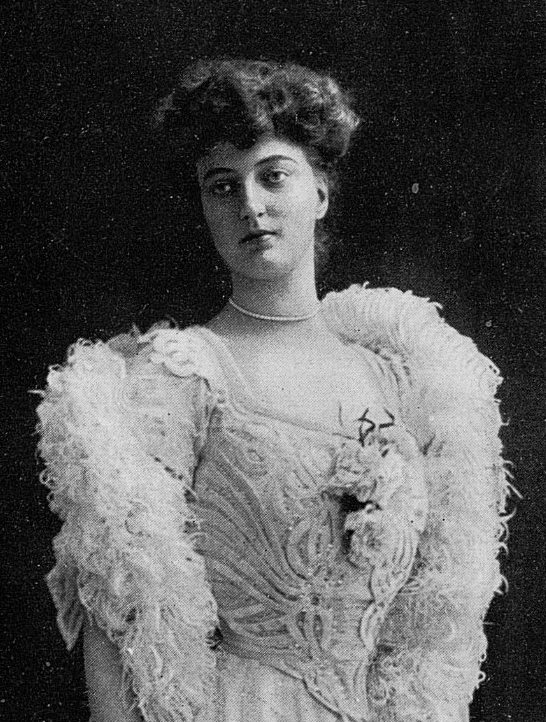
- Louise in 1907
- Born: 24 February 1882; Cannes, France
- Died: 18 April 1958 (aged 76); Seville, Spain
- Burial: Iglesia Colegial del Divino Salvador, Seville
- Spouse: Prince Carlos of Bourbon-Two Sicilies (m. 1907; died 1949)
- Issue: Prince Carlos; Dolores, Princess Augustyn Józef Czartoryski; Infanta Mercedes, Countess of Barcelona; Esperanza, Princess Pedro Gastão of Orléans-Braganza
Names
- French: Louise Françoise Marie Laure
- House: Orléans
- Father: Prince Philippe, Count of Paris
- Mother: Infanta María Isabel of Spain

Princess Louise Françoise Marie Laure of Orléans (24 February 1882 – 18 April 1958) was a Princess of the Two-Sicilies and maternal grandmother of King Juan Carlos I of Spain.

Louise was the youngest daughter of Philippe d'Orléans, Count of Paris and claimant to the French throne as "Philippe VII". Her mother was Infanta María Isabel of Spain, daughter of Antoine, Duke of Montpensier, and Infanta Luisa Fernanda of Spain.

== Marriage and issue ==
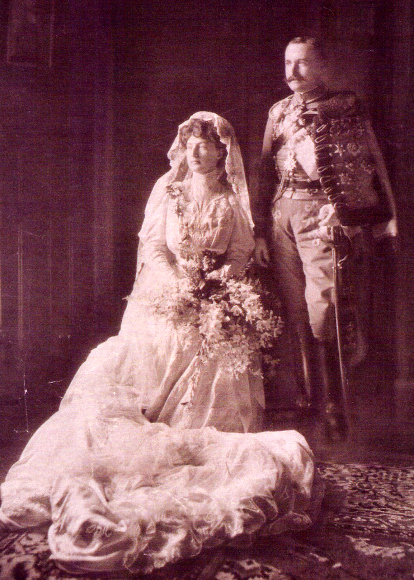
Prince Carlos and Princess Louise photographed on their wedding day in 1907

On 16 November 1907, Louise married in Wood Norton, Worcestershire, UK, Infante Carlos, Prince of Bourbon-Two Sicilies, and widower of María de las Mercedes, Princess of Asturias. The couple lived in Madrid and had four children:

- Prince Carlos of Bourbon-Two Sicilies (1908–1936). Killed in the Spanish Civil War fighting on the Nationalist side.
- Princess María de los Dolores of Bourbon-Two Sicilies (1909–1996). In 1937, she married Prince Augustyn Józef Czartoryski (1907–1946) and had one surviving son, Adam. She remarried to Carlos Chías Ossorio on 1950.
- Princess María de las Mercedes of Bourbon-Two Sicilies (1910–2000) who married Infante Juan, Count of Barcelona and became the mother of King Juan Carlos I of Spain, who abdicated in favor of his son in 2014.
- Princess María de la Esperanza of Bourbon-Two Sicilies (1914–2005), who married Prince Pedro Gastão of Orléans-Braganza.

== Later life ==
In 1931, when the Second Spanish Republic was proclaimed, the family left Spain for Italy and later Switzerland. In 1939, after the victory of Francisco Franco in the Spanish Civil War, they returned to Spain and settled in Seville.

== Heraldry ==
Heraldry of Princess Louise of Orléans

Coat of Arms of Princess Louise as Infanta of Spain

== Ancestry ==
Ancestors of Princess Louise of Orléans

8. Louis Philippe I of France
4. Ferdinand Philippe, Duke of Orléans
9. Princess Maria Amalia of Naples and Sicily
2. Prince Philippe, Count of Paris
10. Frederick Louis, Hereditary Grand Duke of Mecklenburg-Schwerin
5. Duchess Helene of Mecklenburg-Schwerin
11. Princess Caroline Louise of Saxe-Weimar-Eisenach
1. Princess Louise of Orléans
12. Louis Philippe I of France (= 8)
6. Prince Antoine, Duke of Montpensier
13. Princess Maria Amalia of Naples and Sicily (= 9)
3. Princess Marie Isabelle of Orléans
14. Ferdinand VII of Spain
7. Infanta Luisa Fernanda of Spain
15. Princess Maria Christina of the Two Sicilies
