= Princess María de las Mercedes of Bourbon-Two Sicilies =

Countess of Barcelona (1910–2000)

Princess María de las Mercedes
- Countess of Barcelona
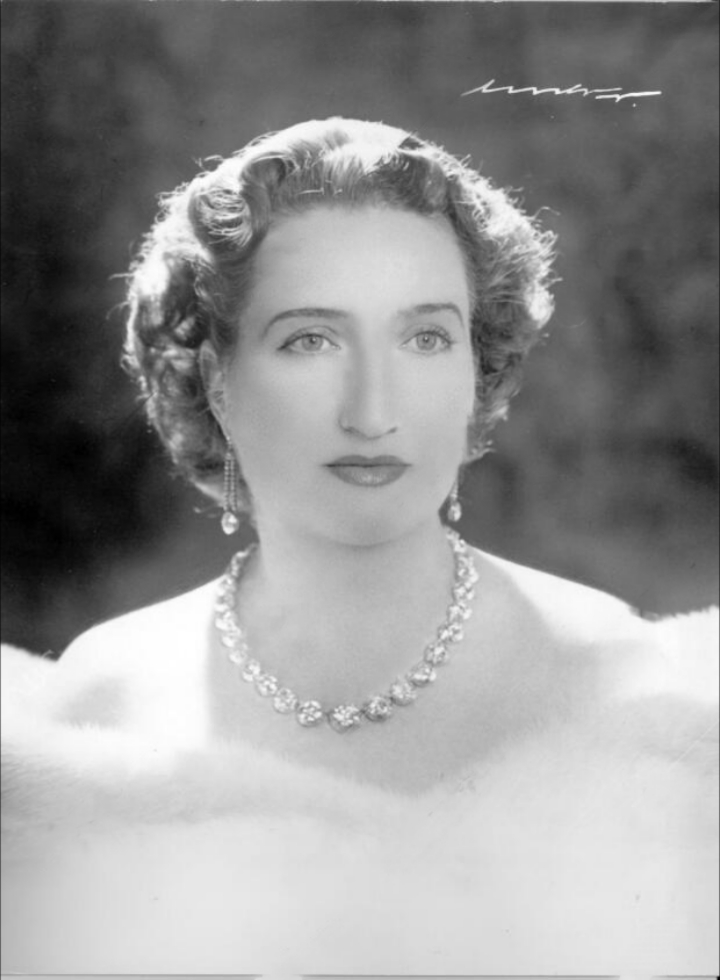
- The Countess of Barcelona, 1951
- Born: 23 December 1910; Palace of Villamejor, Madrid, Spain
- Died: 2 January 2000 (aged 89); Royal Residence of La Mareta, Lanzarote, Spain
- Burial: 4 January 2000; El Escorial
- Spouse: Infante Juan, Count of Barcelona (m. 1935; died 1993)
- Issue: Infanta Pilar, Duchess of Badajoz; Juan Carlos I; Infanta Margarita, Duchess of Soria; Infante Alfonso
Names
- María de las Mercedes Cristina Genara Isabel Luisa Carolina Victoria de Todos los Santos de Borbón y Orléans
- House: Bourbon-Two Sicilies
- Father: Prince Carlos of Bourbon-Two Sicilies
- Mother: Princess Louise of Orléans

Coat of arms of Maria Mercedes of Bourbon, Countess of Barcelona as consort of the Pretender to the Spanish Throne

Princess María de las Mercedes of Bourbon-Two Sicilies (Spanish: [maˈɾi.a meɾˈθeðes]; María de las Mercedes Cristina Genara Isabel Luisa Carolina Victoria y Todos los Santos de Borbón y Orléans; 23 December 1910 – 2 January 2000) was a member of the Spanish royal family and the mother of King Juan Carlos I.

The daughter of Prince Carlos of Bourbon-Two Sicilies and Princess Louise of Orléans, she married Infante Juan, Count of Barcelona, claimant to the Spanish throne.

== Biography ==
María was born in Madrid, daughter of Prince Carlos of Bourbon-Two Sicilies, Infante of Spain, a grandson of King Ferdinand II of the Two Sicilies, and his second wife, Princess Louise of Orléans, daughter of Prince Philippe, Count of Paris, a pretender to the French throne. She was granted, at birth, the rank and precedence of an infanta of Spain, although not the actual use of the title, her own being Princess of Bourbon-Two Sicilies. Her family moved to Seville, when her father was made Captain General of that province. When the Second Spanish Republic forced them into exile, they lived in Cannes and later in Paris, where she studied art at the Louvre.

On 14 January 1935, she attended the wedding, in Rome, of Infanta Beatriz of Spain, daughter of King Alfonso XIII, to Alessandro Torlonia, 5th Prince of Civitella-Cesi. There she met the brother of the bride, her third cousin and future husband, the Infante Juan, fourth son and designated heir of Alfonso XIII. They married in Rome on 12 October 1935. When her husband took up Count of Barcelona as a title of pretence on 8 March 1941, María became the Countess of Barcelona. They had four children.

Issue

- Infanta Pilar, Duchess of Badajoz (30 July 1936 – 8 January 2020), who married Luis Gomez-Acebo y de Estrada, Viscount de la Torre, on 6 May 1967, and had five children
- Juan Carlos I of Spain (born 5 January 1938), who married Princess Sophia of Greece and Denmark on 14 May 1962, and had three children
- Infanta Margarita, Duchess of Soria (born 6 March 1939), who married Don Carlos Zurita y Delgado on 12 October 1972, and had two children
- Infante Alfonso of Spain (3 October 1941 – 29 March 1956)

They lived in Cannes and Rome, and, with the outbreak of World War II, they moved to Lausanne to live with Queen Victoria Eugenie, the mother of Infante Juan. Afterwards, they resided at Estoril, on the Portuguese Riviera.

In 1953, the Countess represented the Spanish Royal Family at the coronation of Queen Elizabeth II.

In 1976, one year after the monarchy was restored in Spain in the person of her son, Juan Carlos, they returned to Spain. She mediated between her son and her husband, estranged since Juan Carlos had been designated heir by Franco. In 1977, Juan renounced his rights in favour of their son, who officially allowed him to retain the title of Count of Barcelona.

She broke her hip in 1982 and the left femur in 1985, which forced her to use a wheelchair for the rest of her life. She became a widow in 1993.

She was a fervent fan of bull fighting and of the Andalusian culture. In 1995, her granddaughter Infanta Elena married in Seville in part because the Countess' love for the city.

She was the 1,171st Dame of the Royal Order of Queen Maria Luisa on 4 March 1929.

She died of a heart attack in the Royal Residence of La Mareta, in Lanzarote, where the royal family had gathered to celebrate the New Millennium. She was buried with the honors of a queen at the Royal Crypt of the monastery of San Lorenzo de El Escorial, near Madrid.

== Ancestry ==
Ancestors of Princess María de las Mercedes of Bourbon-Two Sicilies

8. King Ferdinand II of the Two Sicilies
4. Prince Alfonso, Count of Caserta
9. Archduchess Maria Theresa of Austria
2. Prince Carlos of Bourbon-Two Sicilies
10. Prince Francis, Count of Trapani
5. Princess Maria Antonietta of the Two Sicilies
11. Archduchess Maria Isabella of Austria
1. Princess María de las Mercedes of Bourbon-Two Sicilies
12. Prince Ferdinand Philippe, Duke of Orléans
6. Prince Philippe, Count of Paris
13. Duchess Helene of Mecklenburg-Schwerin
3. Princess Louise of Orléans
14. Prince Antoine, Duke of Montpensier
7. Princess Marie Isabelle of Orléans
15. Infanta Luisa Fernanda of Spain

== Honours ==
National

- Spain: Dame Grand Cross of the Order of Charles III
- Spain: 9th Titular Grand Mistress and 1,171st Dame Grand Cross of the Order of Queen Maria Luisa
- Spain: Dame of the Decoration of the Royal Cavalry Armory of Seville
- Spain: Dame of the Decoration of the Royal Cavalry Armory of Granada
- Spain: Dame of the Decoration of the Royal Cavalry Armory of Valencia
- Spain: Dame of the Decoration of the Royal Cavalry Armory of Zaragoza

Foreign

- (Kingdom of the Two Sicilies) Calabrian House of Bourbon-Two Sicilies: Knight Grand Cross of Justice of the Two-Sicilian Sacred Military Constantinian Order of Saint George
- (Greece) Greek Royal Family: Dame Grand Cross of the Order of Saints Olga and Sophia
- Sovereign Military Order of Malta: Bailiff Dame Grand Cross of the Sovereign Military Order of Malta
- United Kingdom: Recipient of the Queen Elizabeth II Coronation Medal

=== Heraldry ===
Heraldry of María de las Mercedes, Countess of Barcelona
Coat of Arms as Infanta of Spain by marriage (1935–1941)	Coat of Arms as Consort of the Pretender to the throne of Spain (1941–1977)	Coat of Arms after her husband renounced being Pretender (1977–1988)	Coat of Arms after her husband renounced being Pretender (1988–1993) (Dame of the Order of Charles III)	Coat of Arms as a widow (1993–2000)

== See also ==
- Bourbon-Two Sicilies
- Joyas de pasar

Princess María de las Mercedes of Bourbon-Two Sicilies House of Bourbon-Two Sicilies Cadet branch of the House of Bourbon Born: 23 December 1910 Died: 2 January 2000
Titles in pretence
Preceded by Victoria Eugenie of Battenberg	— TITULAR — Queen consort of Spain; 15 January 1941 – 14 May 1977; Reason for succession failure: Monarchy abolished in 1931	Succeeded by Sophia of Greece and Denmark
