= Prince Philippe, Duke of Orléans =

Prince Philippe
- Duke of Orléans
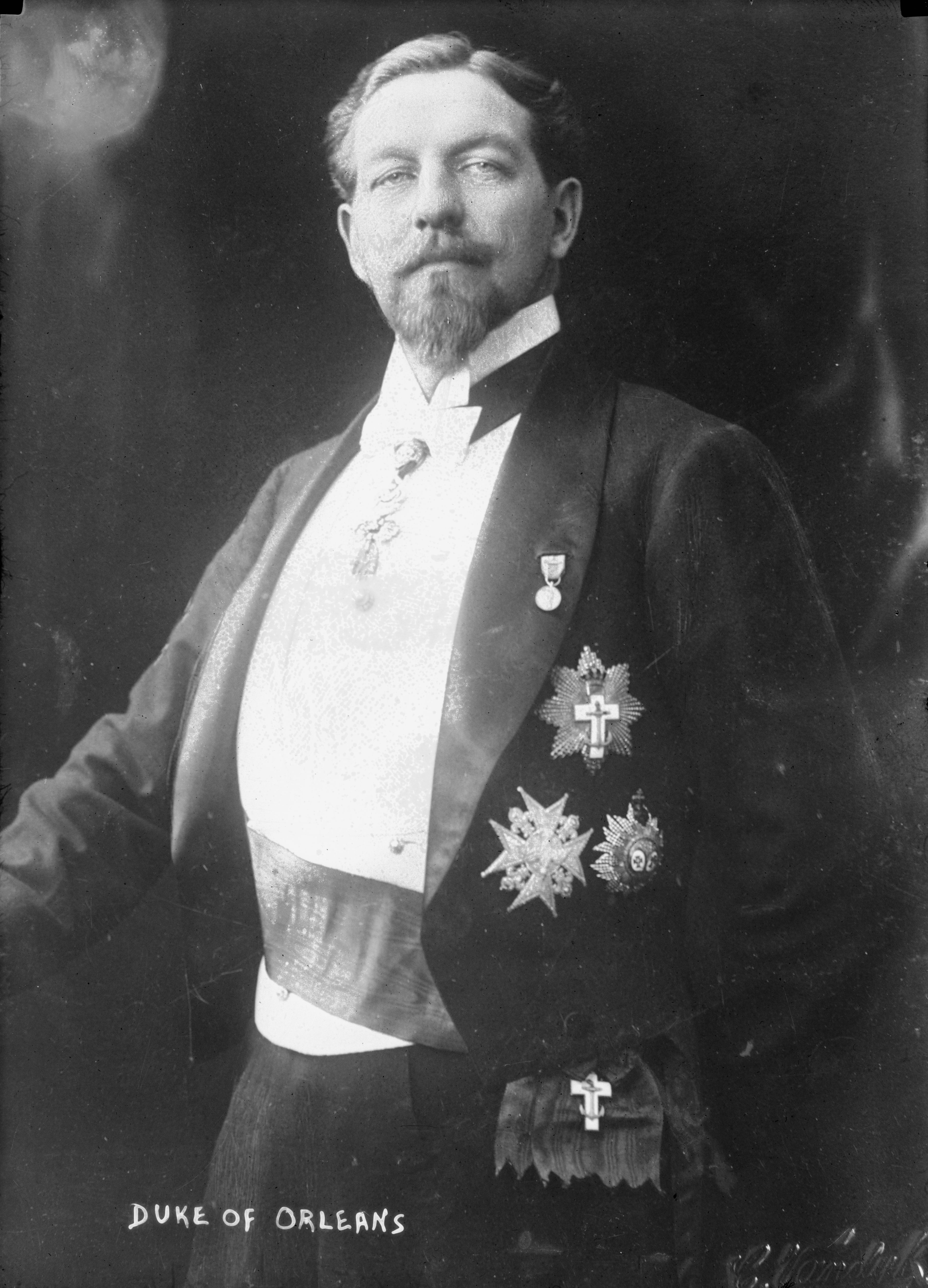
- Philippe wearing the Order of the Golden Fleece, the Grand Cross of Naval Merit, and the Order of the Holy Spirit

Orléanist pretender to the French throne
- Pretence: 8 September 1894 – 28 March 1926
- Predecessor: Philippe, Count of Paris
- Successor: Jean, Duke of Guise
- Born: 6 February 1869; York House, Twickenham, England
- Died: 28 March 1926 (aged 57); Palermo, Italy
- Spouse: Archduchess Maria Dorothea of Austria (m. 1896; sep. 1914)
Names
- French: Louis Philippe Robert d'Orléans
- House: Orléans
- Father: Prince Philippe, Count of Paris
- Mother: Infanta Maria Isabel of Spain
- Religion: Roman Catholicism

Prince Philippe, Duke of Orléans (French: Louis Philippe Robert; 6 February 1869 – 28 March 1926) was the Orléanist pretender to the throne of France from 1894 to 1926 as Philippe VIII.

== Early life ==
Philippe was born at York House, Twickenham, near London, the son of Philippe, Count of Paris, by his wife (and first cousin), Princess Isabelle of Orléans. He was baptised with the names Louis-Philippe-Robert, and was called Philippe. His family lived in the United Kingdom from the abdication and banishment of his great-grandfather Louis Philippe I, King of the French, in 1848, and returned to France in 1871 following the fall of the Second French Empire. However, they again took refuge in England in 1886, when the French Republic exiled them following the wedding in Paris of Philippe's sister Amélie of Orléans to Crown Prince Carlos of Portugal.

Returning therefore to France in 1871 with his parents, Philippe was educated at home at the Château d'Eu and at the Collège Stanislas de Paris. His tutor from the end of 1882 to 1887 was Théodore Froment, previously a professor of Latin literature at Bordeaux. In 1880 Philippe's father granted him the title Duc d'Orléans. On 16 June 1881, he received the sacrament of confirmation at Eu. Growing up to be tall and blond, he later grew a beard. He was a better athlete than scholar and learned to love mountain-climbing from Captain Morhain, a former soldier from Saint-Cyr who had become his father's accountant.

== Military career ==
Philippe began his military education at the École spéciale militaire de Saint-Cyr. In June 1886 he was on the point of becoming an officer in the French army when his family was once again exiled by France's republican government. At first he was placed under the tutelage of a Colonel de Parseval, under whose supervision he would later attend a military academy in Lausanne. In Great Britain and Ireland he entered the Royal Military College, Sandhurst, on the nomination of Queen Victoria in February 1887, completing his training there and developing an abiding interest in geography, topography, and the natural sciences.

He was attached for service to the King's Royal Rifle Corps, which was then serving in the British Raj, but never held an actual commission in the British Army, in order to respect a French law forbidding Frenchmen from holding commissions in foreign armies without the permission of the French head of state. Nevertheless, he was ranked as a sub-lieutenant and served in India from January 1888 to March 1889, where he was a staff-officer to Lord Roberts, then Commander-in-Chief in India.

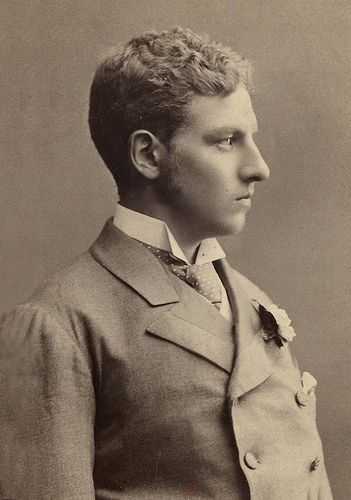
Philippe d'Orléans in 1890

In October 1889, Philippe went to Switzerland to complete a course in military theory. While there he fathered a son, Philippe Debien, by Nina, an actress working in the casino at Lausanne. On his 21st birthday in February 1890 he left Switzerland by train with his friend Honoré d'Albert, 10th duc de Luynes, and entered Paris in violation of the law of exile of 1886. There, he offered to perform his military service, as required by law. Instead he was arrested and confined in the Conciergerie. He was sentenced to two years imprisonment at Clairvaux, but was released after a few months and expelled back to Switzerland.

Drawn to explore the "unknown", Philippe asked Prince George, Duke of Cambridge, to send him to a military post in the Himalayas. While in the East, he undertook a hunting and exploratory expedition in Nepal with his cousin Prince Henri of Orléans, went mountain-climbing in Tibet, and visited Afghanistan, Ceylon, and the Persian Gulf, before being posted back to Britain.

Prior to his imprisonment in France, Philippe had been unofficially engaged to his first cousin Princess Marguerite of Orléans, but the engagement was cancelled when Philippe's involvement with the Australian opera singer Nellie Melba was revealed. Melba was still married to Charles Nesbitt Armstrong, although they had lived apart for some years. Armstrong filed for divorce from Melba on the grounds of adultery, naming Philippe as co-respondent; the case was eventually dropped.

In September 1890, Philippe accompanied his father on a two-month trip to the United States and Canada. They visited the battlefields of the American Civil War, in which his father had fought, as well as Philadelphia, Philadelphia County, Pennsylvania; Washington, D.C.; Richmond, Virginia; Manhattan, New York, New York County, New York; and Quebec, Canada.

On 12 November 1890, while in Philadelphia, Philippe joined the Pennsylvania Commandery of the Military Order of the Loyal Legion of the United States (MOLLUS) - a military society composed of officers who had served the Union in the American Civil War and their descendants - by right of his father's service in the Union Army. He joined as a companion of the 2nd class - a membership category for the eldest sons of companions of the 1st class who were veteran officers and was assigned MOLLUS insignia number 8262. Upon his father's death on 8 September 1894, he became a hereditary companion of the 1st class.

In December 1890, Philippe applied unsuccessfully to serve in the Russian Army. In March 1893, he was elected a Fellow of the Royal Geographical Society.

In March 1894, Philippe went to Egypt and Palestine with his sister Hélène, Duchess of Aosta. Then he went lion shooting in Abyssinia (modern Ethiopia). In May 1894, he was attached to the Royal Buckinghamshire Hussars, a yeomanry regiment.

== Claimant to the defunct throne ==
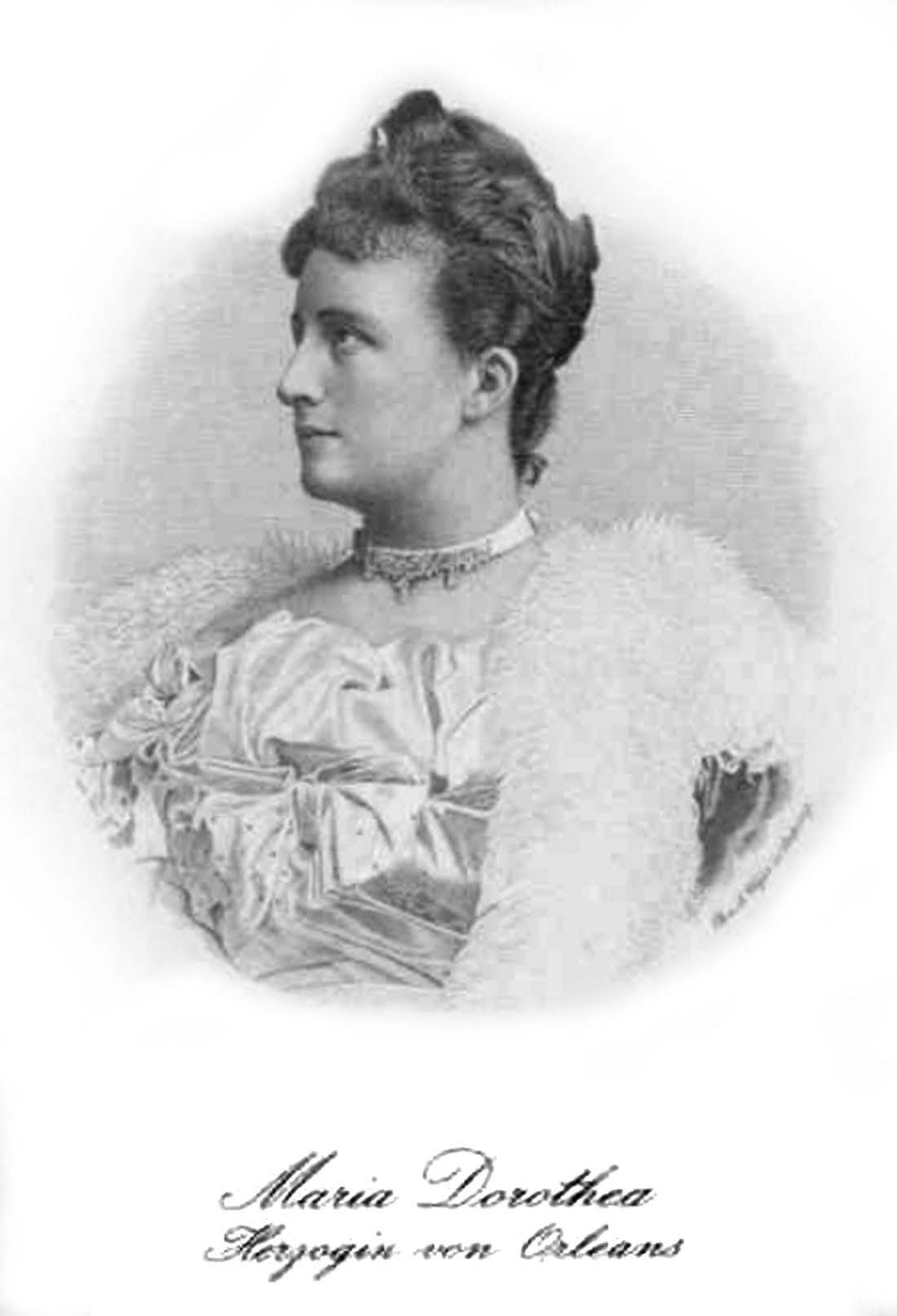
Archduchess Maria Dorothea of Austria

Upon the death of his father on 8 September 1894, Philippe became the Orléanist claimant to the defunct French throne. He was known to monarchists as Philippe VIII. He was an active claimant, regularly issuing manifestos. In October 1895, Philippe was named as co-respondent in the divorce case of Woolston v. Woolston.

Unlike his great grandfather, Louis Philippe I, Philippe claimed grand mastership of the Order of the Holy Spirit as intrinsic to his dynastic claim to the throne, and sometimes wore the breast star of the order.

On 5 November 1896, in Vienna, Philippe married Archduchess Maria Dorothea of Austria (1867–1932), a daughter of Archduke Joseph Karl of Austria, Palatine of Hungary, and granddaughter of Princess Clémentine of Orléans, as well as a niece of Marie Henriette of Austria, Queen Consort of the Belgians. There were no children from this marriage. The couple were poorly matched and after several years they lived apart.

While travelling in Geneva in 1898, Philippe narrowly missed being assassinated by Luigi Lucheni, an anarchist, who vowed to kill the next member of a royal family that he saw. The victim would turn out to be the Empress Elisabeth of Austria, stabbed to death on the quayside.

He was an active yachtsman and made four Arctic voyages. In 1904 he sailed to Svalbard, Norway, Sweden-Norway. He explored parts of the northeastern coast of Greenland, Denmark, in 1905 during his Duke of Orléans Arctic Expedition on ship Belgica. In 1907 he sailed in the Kara Sea north of Siberia, Russia, and in 1909 went even further north into the Arctic Ocean.

He made a short film, Jaripeo y fiestas en Jalapa ("Jaripeo and Festivals in Jalapa"), during a trip to Mexico in 1910.

Philippe continued to reside in the United Kingdom until 1912, when he moved his primary residence to Belgium. In 1914, Philippe and his wife Maria Dorothea were legally separated. She subsequently lived in Hungary.

At the outbreak of the First World War, Philippe again tried unsuccessfully to join the French army. He was also refused permission to serve in the Belgian army and instead returned to the United Kingdom. A plan to join the Italian army was prevented by a serious accident in which he was knocked down by a bus.

In 1926, Philippe died of pneumonia at the Palais d'Orléans in Palermo, Sicily, Italy. Having no legitimate issue, he was succeeded as pretender to the defunct throne of France by his cousin and brother in law, Prince Jean, Duke of Guise.

== Publications ==
Philippe wrote a number of works based on his many travels:

- Une expédition de chasse au Népal ("A hunting trip to Nepal"), Paris: C. Lévy, 1892.
- Une croisière au Spitzberg, yacht Maroussia, 1904, Paris: Imprimerie de Chaix, 1904
- Croisière océanographique: accomplie à bord de la Belgica dans la Mer du Grönland, 1905, Brussels: C. Bulens, 1907
- La revanche de la banquise: un été de dérive dans la mer de Kara, juin-septembre 1907, Paris: Plon-Nourrit, 1909
- Campagne Arctique de 1907, Brussels: C. Bulens, 1910–1912
- Hunters and Hunting in the Arctic, London: David Nutt, 1911 (published in French as Chasses et chasseurs arctiques, Paris: Librairie Plon, 1929)

He also published a collection of the papers of his father and of the Henri, comte de Chambord:

- La monarchie française: lettres et documents politiques (1844–1907), Paris: Librairie nationale, 1907

== Honours ==
- Duke of Orleans Land in NE Greenland was named after him.
- (Kingdom of France) French Royal Family:
  - Grand Master and Knight of the Order of the Holy Spirit
  - Grand Master and Knight of the Order of St. Michael
  - Grand Master and Grand Cross of the Military Order of St. Louis
- Austria-Hungary: Knight of the Order of the Golden Fleece, 1896
- Principality of Bulgaria:
  - Grand Cross of the Order of St. Alexander, 21 February 1907
  - Knight of the Order of Saints Cyril and Methodius, 1912/13
- Kingdom of Portugal:
  - Grand Cross of the Sash of the Two Orders
  - Grand Cross of the Order of the Immaculate Conception of Vila Viçosa, 22 May 1886
- Sovereign Military Order of Malta: Bailiff Grand Cross of Honour and Devotion
- Spain:
  - Grand Cross of the Order of Isabella the Catholic
  - Knight of the Royal Cavalry Armory of Seville, 1910
  - Grand Cross of Naval Merit with white decoration
- United Kingdom: Commemorative Medal for the Diamond Jubilee of Queen Victoria

== In popular culture ==
Duke Philippe of Orleans briefly appears in an urban fantasy novel for children, The Master Key (1901) by L. Frank Baum.

== Ancestry ==
Ancestors of Prince Philippe, Duke of Orléans

8. Louis Philippe I of France
4. Prince Ferdinand Philippe, Duke of Orléans
9. Princess Marie Amélie of Naples and Sicily
2. Prince Philippe, Count of Paris
10. Frederick Louis, Hereditary Grand Duke of Mecklenburg-Schwerin
5. Duchess Helene of Mecklenburg-Schwerin
11. Princess Caroline Louise of Saxe-Weimar-Eisenach
1. Prince Philippe, Duke of Orléans
12. Louis Philippe I of France (= 8)
6. Prince Antoine, Duke of Montpensier
13. Princess Marie Amélie of Naples and Sicily (= 9)
3. Princess Marie Isabelle of Orléans
14. Ferdinand VII of Spain
7. Infanta Luisa Fernanda of Spain
15. Princess Maria Christina of the Two Sicilies

== Bibliography ==
- Lafon, Marie-Françoise. Philippe, duc d'Orléans, 1869–1926: explorateur, navigateur, naturaliste. Paris: Société nouvelle des Editions Boubée, 1999.
- Colleville, Ludovic, comte de. Le duc d'Orléans intime: la jeunesse du duc d'Orléans, à l'armée des Indes, le duc en France, son arrestation, le mariage du duc d'Orléans, croisières, le mouvement néo-royaliste. Paris: Librairie F. Juven, 1905.
- "Obituary: The Duke of Orleans". The Times ( 29 March 1926): 9.
- "Death of the Duke of Orleans". The Times ( 29 March 1926): 14.
- "French Pretender Ill With Pneumonia". The New York Times ( 28 March 1926): 18.
- "French Pretender is Dead in Sicily". The New York Times. ( 29 March 1926): 1.
- "France Uncertain on New Pretender". The New York Times. ( 30 March 1926): 15.
- Philipps, R. Le Clerc. "French Pretender Had Little or No Support". The New York Times. ( 4 April 1926): XX6.

Prince Philippe, Duke of Orléans House of Orléans Cadet branch of the House of Bourbon Born: 6 February 1869 Died: 28 March 1926
Titles in pretence
Preceded by Philippe VII	— TITULAR — King of France; Orléanist pretender 8 September 1894 – 28 March 1926	Succeeded by Jean III
Vacant Title last held by Louis (XIX)	— TITULAR — Dauphin of France; 24 August 1883 – 8 September 1894	Vacant Title next held by Henri (VI)
