= Prince Carlos of Bourbon-Two Sicilies =

Infante of Spain (1870–1949)

Prince Carlos
- Infante of Spain
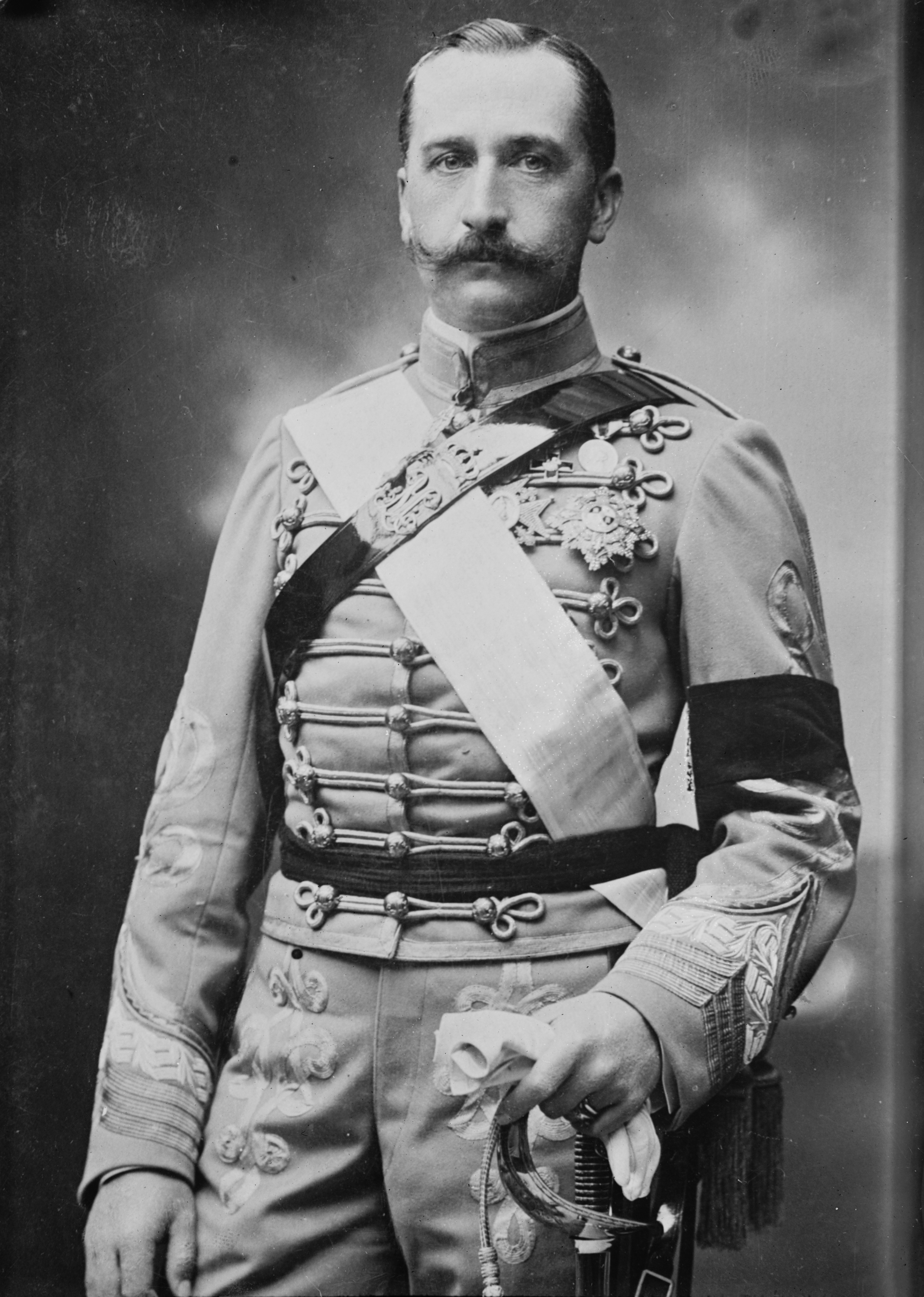
- Formal photo portrait wearing a Spanish Hussar uniform, 1913
- Born: 10 November 1870; Gries-San Quirino, Bolzano, Austria-Hungary
- Died: 11 November 1949 (aged 79); Seville, Spain
- Burial: Iglesia Colegial del Divino Salvador, Seville
- Spouse: María de las Mercedes, Princess of Asturias (m. 1901; died 1904) Princess Louise of Orléans (m. 1907)
- Issue: Infante Alfonso, Duke of Calabria; Infante Fernando; Isabel Alfonsa, Countess Jan Kanty Zamoyski; Prince Carlos; María de los Dolores, Princess Augustyn Józef Czartoryski; Infanta María de las Mercedes, Countess of Barcelona; María de la Esperanza, Princess of Orléans-Braganza
Names
- Italian: Carlo Maria Francesco d'Assisi Pasquale Ferdinando Antonio di Padova Francesco de Paola Alfonso Andrea Avelino Tancredi
- House: Bourbon-Two Sicilies
- Father: Prince Alfonso, Count of Caserta
- Mother: Princess Maria Antonietta of the Two Sicilies

Don Carlos, Prince of Bourbon-Two Sicilies, Infante of Spain (Full Italian name: Carlo Maria Francesco d'Assisi Pasquale Ferdinando Antonio di Padova Francesco de Paola Alfonso Andrea Avelino Tancredi, Principe di Borbone delle Due Sicilie, Infante di Spagna; 10 November 1870 – 11 November 1949) was the son of Prince Alfonso of the Two Sicilies, Count of Caserta and Princess Maria Antonietta of Bourbon-Two Sicilies, and nephew of the last King of the Two Sicilies, Francis II.

== Marriages and children ==
On 14 February 1901 in Madrid, Carlos married Mercedes, Princess of Asturias, elder daughter of the late King Alfonso XII of Spain and of his wife Archduchess Maria Christina of Austria. Mercedes was the elder sister and heir presumptive to King Alfonso XIII of Spain, an unmarried teenager. A week before the wedding, on 7 February, Carlos was given the title of Infante of Spain.

Carlos and Mercedes had three children:

- Don Alfonso, Prince of the Two Sicilies, Infante of Spain (1901–1964), Duke of Calabria (1960-64).
- Don Fernando of Bourbon-Two Sicilies (1903–1905), died in San Sebastián one year after his mother's death.
- Doña Isabella Alfonsa, Princess of the Two Sicilies, Infanta of Spain (1904–1985). Married Count Jan Kanty Zamoyski (1900–1961) and had issue.

Mercedes died in childbirth in 1904.

In 1907, Carlos married secondly to Princess Louise of Orléans, daughter of Prince Philippe, Count of Paris. The couple had four children:

- Don Carlos of Bourbon-Two Sicilies (1908–1936). Killed in the Spanish Civil War.
- Doña María de los Dolores of Bourbon-Two Sicilies (1909–1996). In 1937, she married Prince Augustyn Józef Czartoryski (1907–1946) and had one surviving son, Adam. She remarried to Carlos Chias on 1950.
- Doña María de las Mercedes of Bourbon-Two Sicilies (1910–2000) who married Infante Juan, Count of Barcelona and became King Juan Carlos I of Spain's mother.
- Doña María de la Esperanza of Bourbon-Two Sicilies (1914–2005), who married Prince Pedro Gastão of Orléans-Braganza.

Prince Carlos's descendants include King Felipe VI of Spain, Prince Pedro, Duke of Calabria, Prince Pedro Carlos of Orléans-Braganza, and Philip, Hereditary Prince of Yugoslavia, among others.

== Military service ==
Carlos served in the Spanish Army in the Spanish–American War and received the Military Order of Maria Cristina. Eventually he rose to the rank of Inspector General.

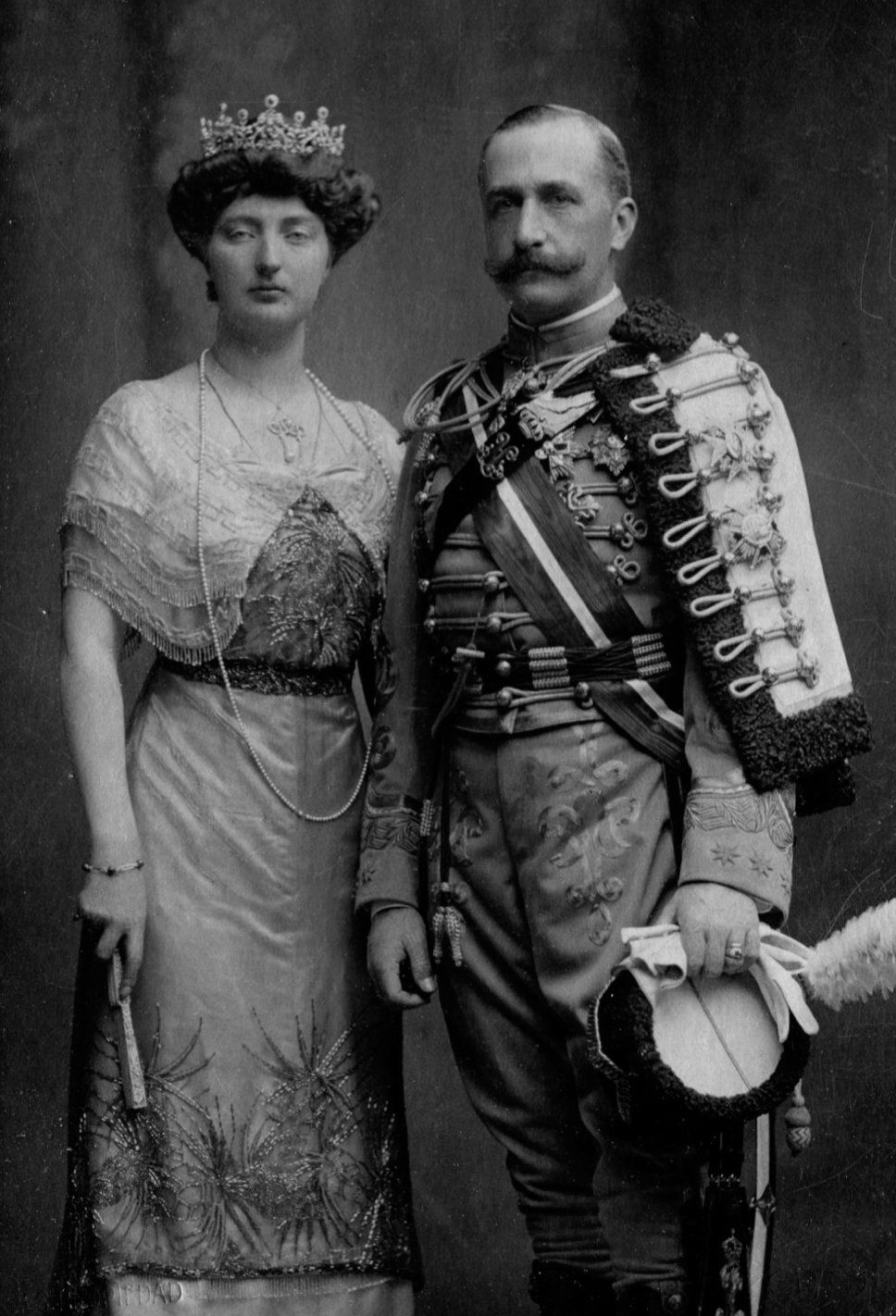
Prince Carlos with his second wife, Princess Louise of Orléans, c. 1909

== Two Sicilies succession ==
In 1894, Carlos's father Alfonso became the head of the House of Bourbon-Two Sicilies. On marrying his first wife, Carlos renounced on 14 December 1900 his future rights of succession to the non-existent Crown of Two Sicilies in an official document, known as the Act of Cannes, subject to a requirement in the Treaty of Naples of 1759 and the Pragmatic Decree of 6 October 1759 that the Crown of Spain should not be combined with the "Italian Sovereignty". In 1960, Carlos' elder brother Ferdinand died without male issue, and a dispute arose between Carlos' son Alfonso and Carlos' younger brother Ranieri on the headship of the house, this with competing claims: by the law of primogeniture, Carlos' son Alfonso was considered the heir, but Ranieri claimed that Carlos had renounced his rights and those of his descendants according to the Act of Cannes. Alfonso refuted that claim by stating that it was only a promise from his father to relinquish this right if the crown of the Kingdom of the Two Sicilies were to be united with the Spanish Crown. Since this did not happen, the act had no effect and Carlos' son Alfonso reclaimed his rights. The dispute is still not resolved. Alfonso's claim was recognised by the heads of the different lines of the House of Bourbon, although not by the head of the Orleans family, and in 1983 the Spanish Council of State, following an investigation by the Ministries of Justice and Foreign Affairs, the Royal Academy of Jurisprudence and Legislation and the Institute Salazar y Castro concluded unanimously in favour of Infante Don Alfonso's only son, Prince and Infante Don Carlos, a position shared by the Spanish Royal House.

== Honours ==
Coat of Arms of Prince Carlos as Infante of Spain

- Spain:
  - Knight of the Distinguished Order of the Golden Fleece, 7 February 1901
  - Grand Cross of the Royal and Distinguished Order of Charles III, with Collar, 7 February 1901
  - Grand Cross of the Royal Order of Isabella the Catholic, 7 February 1901
  - Grand Commander of the Order of Alcántara, 21 March 1901
  - Grand Cross of the Order of Military Merit, with Red Decoration, 4 May 1910
  - Grand Cross of the Order of Naval Merit, with White Decoration, 10 October 1923
  - Grand Cross of the Royal and Military Order of Saint Hermenegild, 8 July 1929
  - Grand Cross of the Military Order of Maria Cristina
  - Knight of the Royal Nobility Corps of the Principality of Girona
- Kingdom of Bavaria: Knight of the Royal Order of Saint Hubert, 1897
- (Thailand) Siam: Knight of the Order of the Royal House of Chakri, 8 June 1902
- United Kingdom: Honorary Knight Grand Cross of the Most Honourable Order of the Bath (civil), 27 January 1903 (presented to the Prince by Sir Mortimer Durand, British Ambassador to Madrid, on the previous day).

== Ancestry ==
Ancestors of Prince Carlos of Bourbon-Two Sicilies

8. Francis I of the Two Sicilies
4. Ferdinand II of the Two Sicilies
9. Infanta Maria Isabella of Spain
2. Prince Alfonso, Count of Caserta
10. Archduke Charles, Duke of Teschen
5. Archduchess Maria Theresa of Austria
11. Princess Henrietta of Nassau-Weilburg
1. Prince Carlos of Bourbon-Two Sicilies
12. Francis I of the Two Sicilies (= 8)
6. Prince Francis, Count of Trapani
13. Infanta Maria Isabella of Spain (= 9)
3. Princess Maria Antonietta of Bourbon-Two Sicilies
14. Leopold II, Grand Duke of Tuscany
7. Archduchess Maria Isabella of Austria
15. Princess Maria Antonia of the Two Sicilies
