= St Raphael's Church, Surbiton =

Coordinates: 51.4021°N 0.3076°W

St Raphael
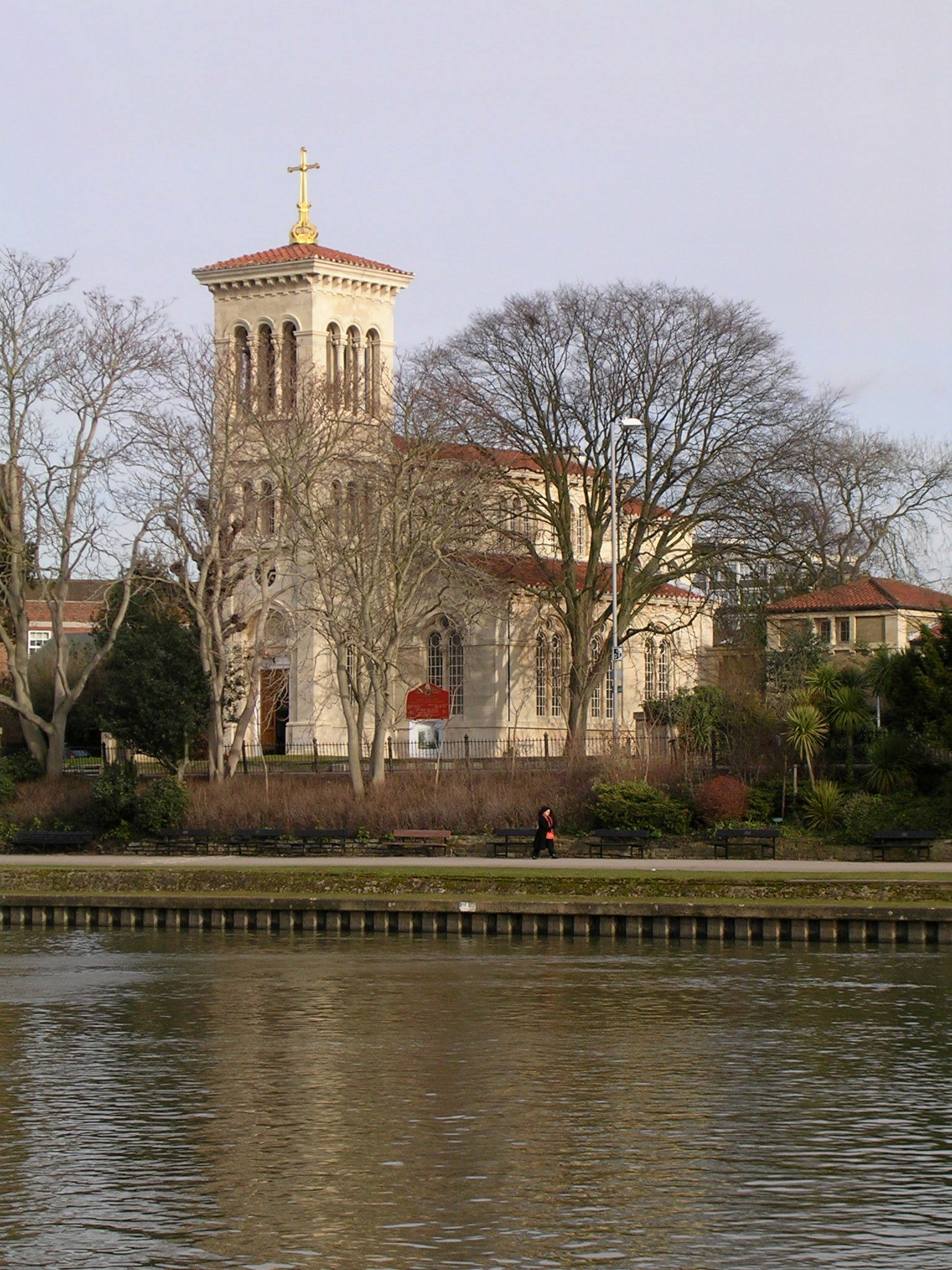
- Surbiton's Roman Catholic church of Saint Raphael
- St Raphael
- OS grid reference: TQ 17823 68365
- Location: Portsmouth Road, Kingston, Surrey
- Country: England
- Denomination: Roman Catholic
- Website: St Raphael's Church

History
- Founded: 1846–1848
- Consecrated: 28 September 2012; 13 years ago

Administration
- Diocese: Archdiocese of Southwark
- Parish: Kingston

Clergy
- Priest: Fr. Michael Lovell

Listed Building – Grade II*
- Designated: 24 December 1968
- Reference no.: 1080045

St Raphael's Church, Surbiton is the Roman Catholic parish church of Surbiton. It is dedicated to Saint Raphael and located on Portsmouth Road. It is Grade II* listed.

== History ==
It was designed by the eminent architect Charles Parker in an Italianate style, with early Christian and Renaissance influences. The entire cost was met by Alexander Raphael, a Catholic Armenian whose family came from India. He became the first Roman Catholic to be elected Sheriff of London after the passing of the Catholic Emancipation Act in 1829. Raphael built the Church in 1846 as a family chapel and named it after St Raphael. It was completed in 1848. But soon after, in November 1850, he died. His nephew, Edward, inherited the property and opened it to the public as the first Roman Catholic church in Kingston.

Through successive bequests, the Church and land became the property of Captain Hon. George Savile, brother to the Sixth Earl of Mexborough, a Yorkshire family.

There is a memorial plaque for Lady Anne Savile, daughter of the fourth Earl, Colonel Minchin and Captain Hamilton who were lost attempting to set an aviation record by being the first aviator to fly over the Atlantic Ocean from east to west. Other members of the Savile family who lived nearby in Thames Ditton are buried in the vault under the High Altar.

The church was sold to the Diocese of Southwark after the Second World War and is now on the Registered List of Buildings of historical and architectural interest. The church was officially consecrated on St Raphael's Day (28 September) 2012.

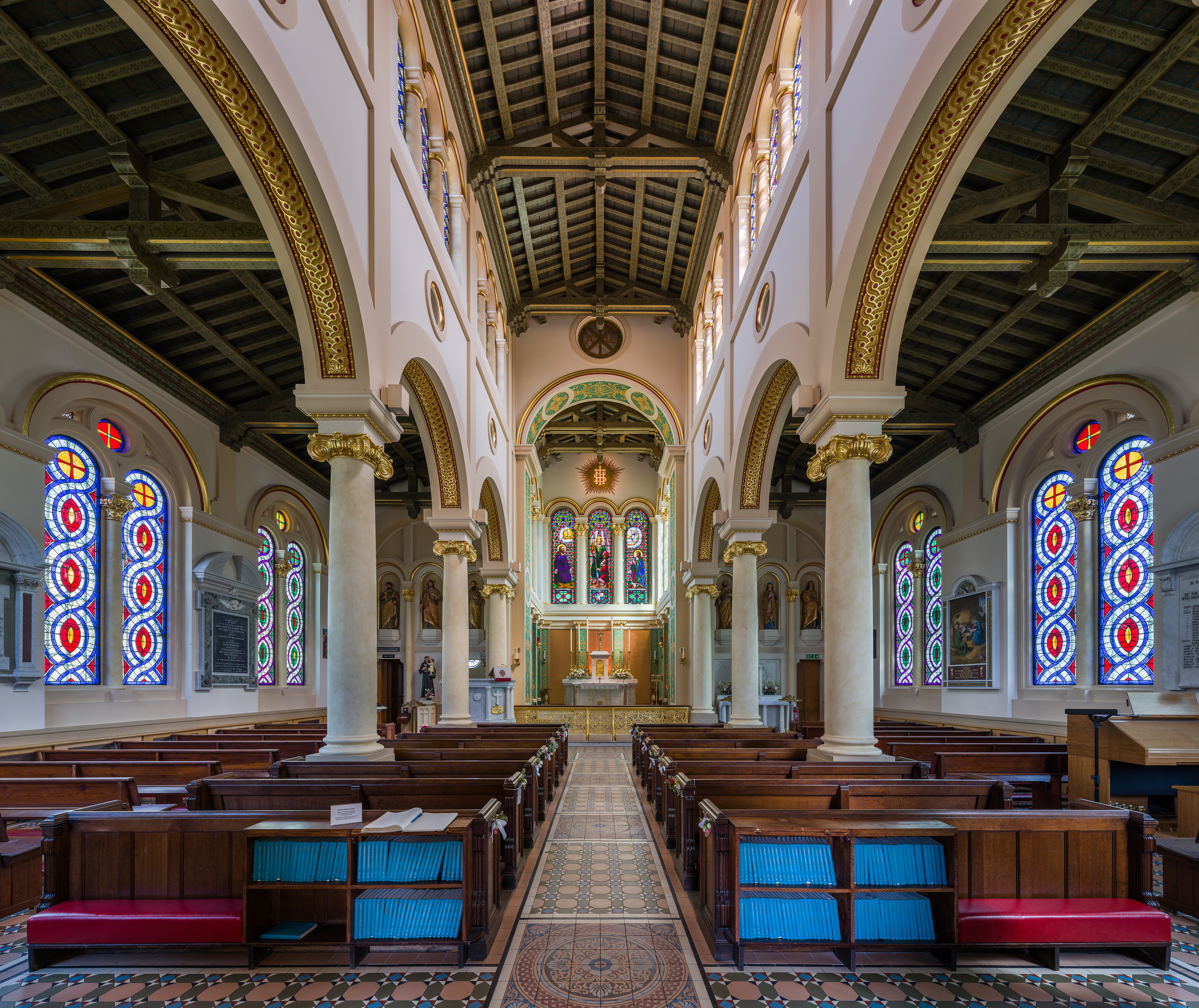
Interior

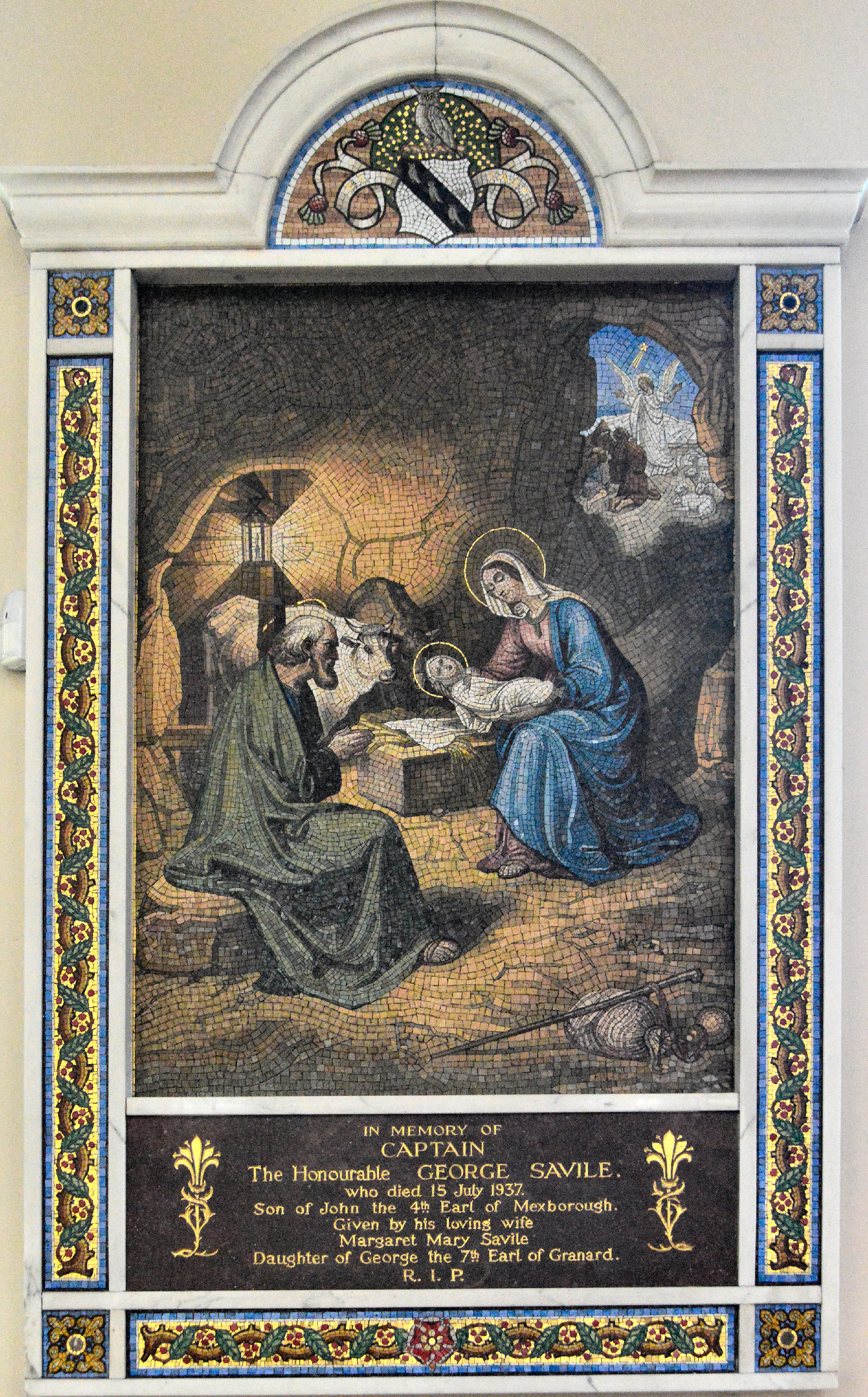
Savile mosaic

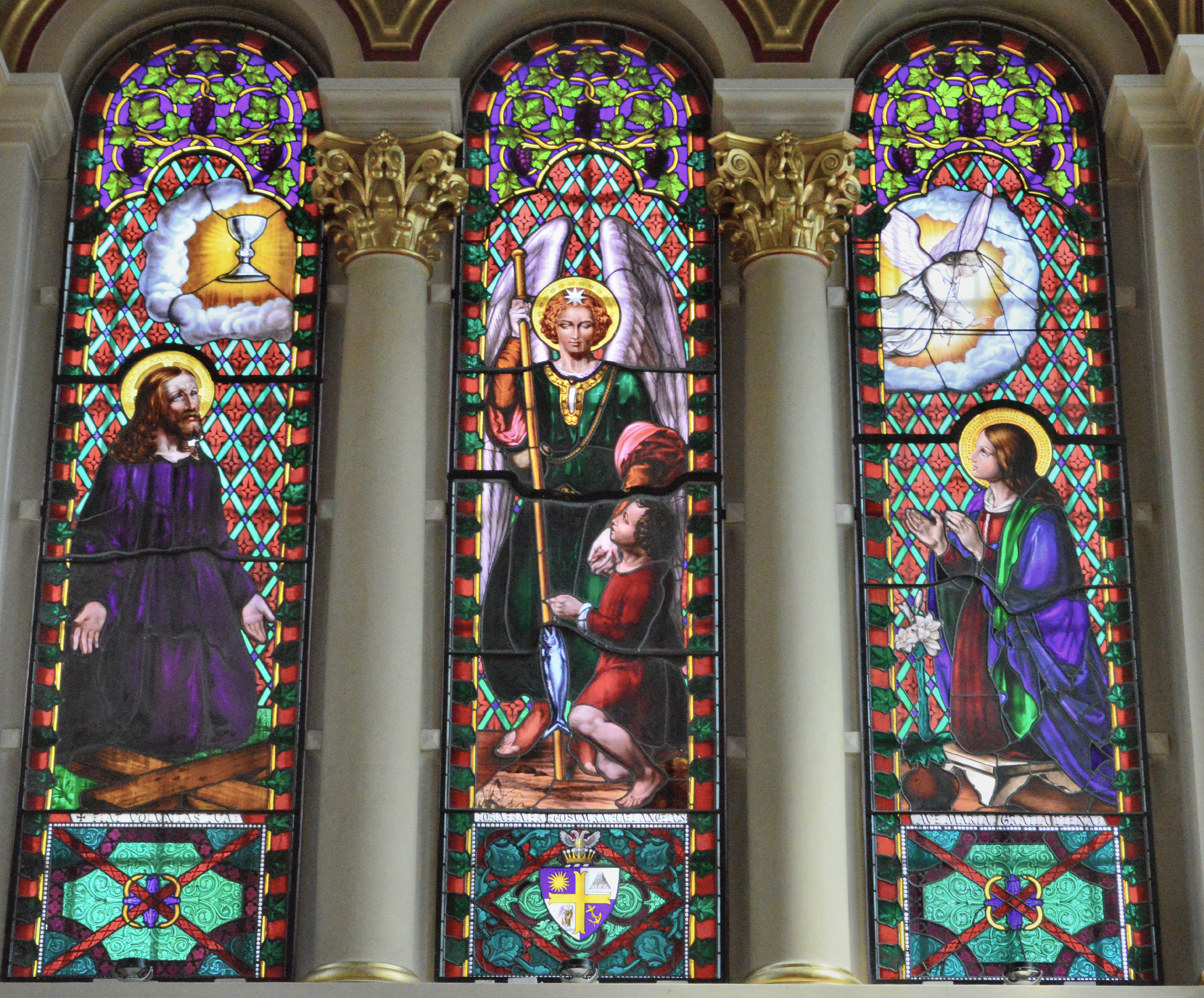
East window

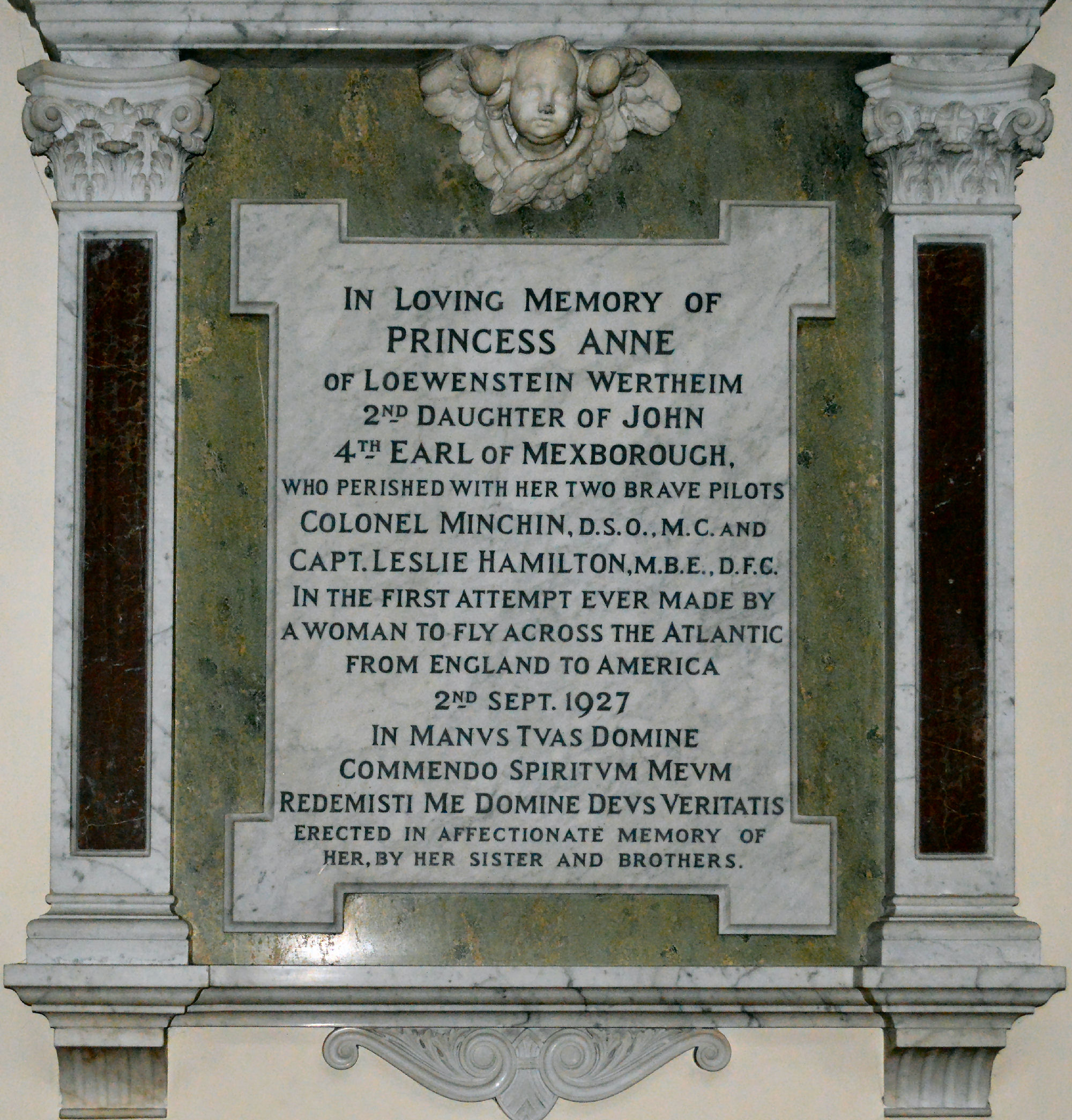
Princess Anne of Loewenstein Wertheim plaque
