= Prince Philippe, Count of Paris =

French royal; pretender to the French throne (1848–1894)

Louis Philippe II
- King of the French; Count of Paris
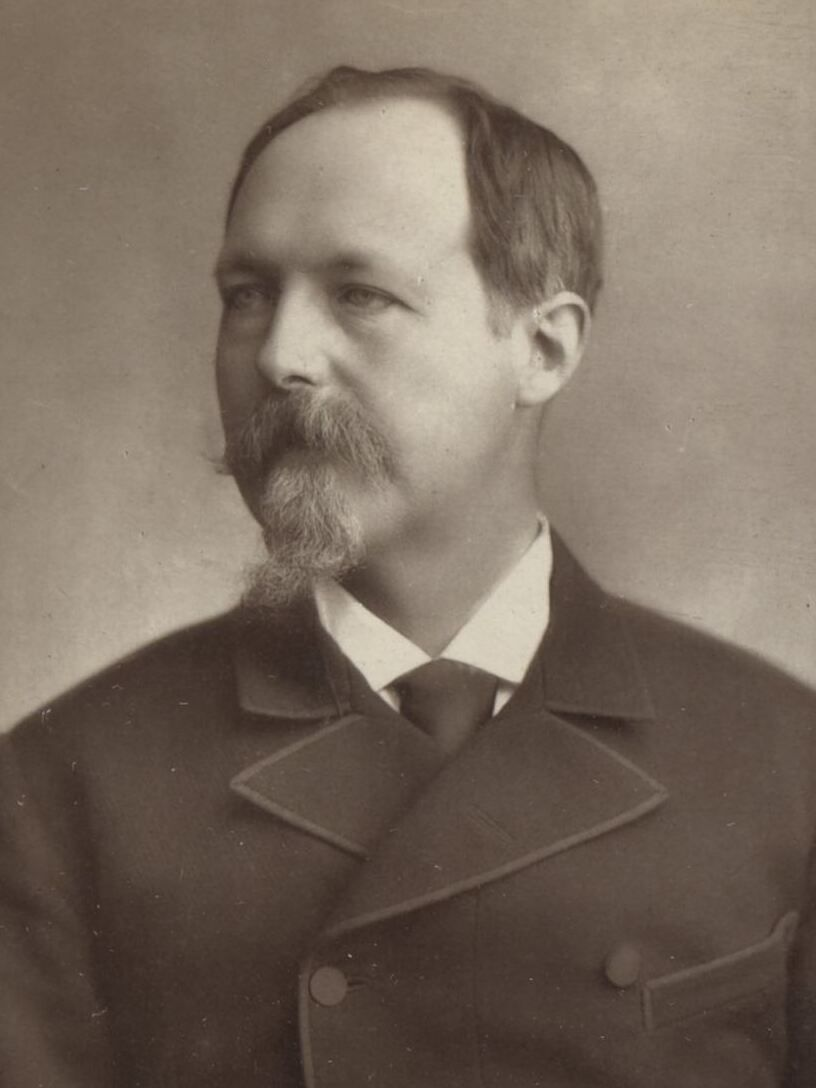
- Prince Philippe, c. 1890

King of the French (disputed) as Louis Philippe II
- Reign: 24 February 1848 – 26 February 1848
- Predecessor: Louis Philippe I (as King of the French)
- Successor: Monarchy abolished (Jacques-Charles Dupont de l'Eure, as President of the Provisional Government)

Orléanist pretender to the French throne
- Pretence: 24 February 1848 – 5 August 1873
- Predecessor: Louis Philippe I (as King of the French)
- Successor: Claim ended

Unionist pretender to the French throne
- Pretence: 24 August 1883 – 8 September 1894
- Predecessor: Henri, Count of Chambord
- Successor: Philippe, Duke of Orléans
- Born: 24 August 1838; Tuileries Palace, Paris, France
- Died: 8 September 1894 (aged 56); Stowe House, Buckinghamshire, England, United Kingdom
- Burial: Chapel of St. Charles Borromeo, Weybridge (1894–1958); Royal Chapel of Dreux (since 1958)
- Spouse: Princess Marie Isabelle of Orléans (m. 1864)
- Issue: Amélie, Queen of Portugal; Prince Philippe, Duke of Orléans; Princess Hélène, Duchess of Aosta; Princess Isabelle, Duchess of Guise; Louise, Princess Carlos of Bourbon-Two Sicilies; Prince Ferdinand, Duke of Montpensier
Names
- Louis Philippe Albert d'Orléans
- House: Orléans
- Father: Prince Ferdinand Philippe, Duke of Orléans
- Mother: Duchess Helene of Mecklenburg-Schwerin
- Religion: Roman Catholicism
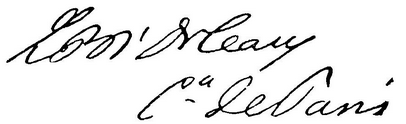
- Signature

Prince Philippe of Orléans, Count of Paris (Louis Philippe Albert; 24 August 1838 – 8 September 1894), was disputedly King of the French from 24 to 26 February 1848 as Louis Philippe II, although he was never officially proclaimed as such. He was the grandson of Louis Philippe I, King of the French. He was the Count of Paris as Orléanist claimant to the French throne from 1848 until his death. From 1883, when his cousin Henri, Count of Chambord died, he was often referred to by Orléanists and a large faction of Legitimists as Philippe VII.

== Early life ==
Prince Philippe became the Prince Royal, heir apparent to the throne, when his father, Prince Ferdinand Philippe, Duke of Orléans, died in a carriage accident in 1842. Although there was some effort during the day of the abdication of his grandfather in 1848 to put him on the throne under the name of Louis-Philippe II, with his mother (Duchess Helene of Mecklenburg-Schwerin) as Regent, this came to nothing. They fled, and the French Second Republic was proclaimed.

== American Civil War ==
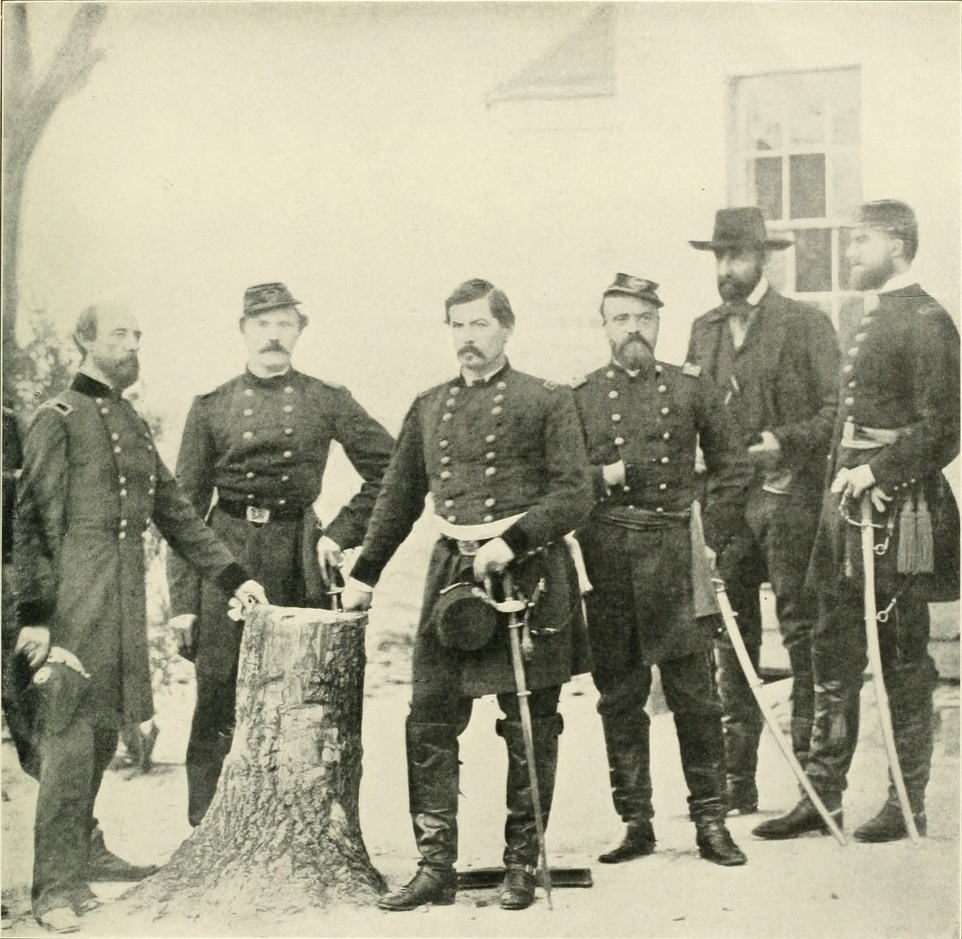
Philippe d'Orléans (first from right) with staff and dignitaries of General McClellan (center). To his right, his uncle François d'Orléans

A historian, journalist and outspoken democrat, Philippe volunteered to serve as a Union Army officer in the American Civil War along with his younger brother, Prince Robert, Duke of Chartres. He was appointed as an assistant adjutant general with the rank of captain on 24 September 1861 and served under the name of Philippe d'Orléans, the Count of Paris. He served on the staff of the commander of the Army of the Potomac, Major General George B. McClellan, for nearly a year. He distinguished himself during the unsuccessful Peninsular Campaign. He resigned from the Union Army, along with his brother, on 15 July 1862. Philippe's History of the Civil War in America is considered a standard reference work on the subject.

During their stay in the United States, the princes were accompanied by their uncle, the Prince of Joinville, who painted many watercolours of their stay. On 10 November 1880 Philippe was elected as a companion of the first class (i.e. a veteran officer) of the Pennsylvania Commandery of the Military Order of the Loyal Legion of the United States – an organization of Union officers who had served during the American Civil War. He was assigned insignia number 2107. His eldest son, Philippe d'Orleans, was elected as a 2nd class member (i.e. an eldest son of a veteran officer) in 1890 and succeeded to first class membership in the Order upon Philippe's death.

== Marriage and issue ==
On 30 May 1864 at St. Raphael's Church in Kingston upon Thames, England he married his paternal first cousin, Princess Marie Isabelle d'Orléans (1848–1919), Infanta of Spain. She was the daughter of Infanta Luisa Fernanda of Spain and Prince Antoine, Duke of Montpensier (1824–1890), the youngest son of Louis Philippe I of France and Maria Amalia of Naples and Sicily. They had eight children:

- Princess Amélie d'Orléans (1865–1951); married Carlos I of Portugal in 1886.
- Prince Louis Philippe Robert d'Orléans, Duke of Orléans (1869–1926); married Archduchess Maria Dorothea of Austria, daughter of Archduke Joseph Karl of Austria in 1896,
- Princess Hélène of Orléans (1871–1951); married Emmanuel Philibert, 2nd Duke of Aosta in 1895.
- Prince Charles d'Orléans (1875–1875).
- Princess Isabelle d'Orléans (1878–1961); married her cousin Prince Jean, Duke of Guise in 1899.
- Prince Jacques Marie Antoine Clément d'Orléans (1880–1881).
- Princess Louise d'Orléans (1882–1958); married Prince Carlos of Bourbon-Two Sicilies in 1907. Through her daughter, Maria Mercedes of Bourbon-Two Sicilies, she was the grandmother of King Juan Carlos I of Spain.
- Prince Ferdinand d'Orléans, Duke of Montpensier (1884–1924); married Marie Isabelle Gonzales de Olañeta y Ibaretta, Marchioness of Valdeterrazo in 1921.

== Restoration of French monarchy ==
The Orleans family had been in exile in England since the Revolution of 1848 which toppled King Louis Philippe. During their early married life, the Count and Countess of Paris lived at York House, Twickenham. However, in 1871 after the Franco-Prussian War and the downfall of Napoleon III, they were allowed to return to France, and many of their properties were restored to them. In 1873, anticipating a restoration of the monarchy by the largely monarchist National Assembly that had been elected following the fall of Napoleon III, the Count of Paris withdrew his claims to the defunct French throne in favour of the legitimist claimant, Henri V, best known as the Comte de Chambord. It was assumed by most that the Count of Paris was Chambord's heir-presumptive, and would thus be able to succeed to the throne upon the childless Chambord's death, reuniting the two claims that had divided French monarchists since 1830. However, Chambord's refusal to recognize the tricolor as the French flag sabotaged hopes of a restoration, and Chambord died in 1883 without ever specifically recognizing his Orléanist rival as his heir-presumptive.

Upon the Count of Chambord's death, the Count of Paris was recognized by most monarchists as Philippe VII of France. This succession was disputed by the Carlist descendants of the Bourbon kings of Spain, who argued that, being descended directly from Louis XIV, their claim was greater than that of the Orléanists; however, this argument pointedly ignored Philip V of Spain's renunciation of his and his descendants' claim to the French throne pursuant to the Treaty of Utrecht.

In 1886 the family was exiled again returning to the United Kingdom, where they first lived at Sheen House, near Richmond, where the young Rosa Lewis was a member of their household. In 1890 they moved to the much grander Stowe House, where he died in 1894. He was succeeded as claimant to the defunct French throne by his son Prince Philippe.

== Honours ==
- Saxe-Weimar-Eisenach: Grand Cross of the Order of the White Falcon, 24 August 1856
- Denmark: Knight of the Order of the Elephant, 22 October 1885
- Kingdom of Portugal: Grand Cross of the Sash of the Two Orders, 22 May 1886

== Ancestry ==
Ancestors of Prince Philippe, Count of Paris

8. Louis Philippe II, Duke of Orléans
4. Louis Philippe I of France
9. Louise Marie Adélaïde de Bourbon
2. Prince Ferdinand Philippe, Duke of Orléans
10. Ferdinand I of the Two Sicilies
5. Princess Marie Amélie of Naples and Sicily
11. Archduchess Maria Carolina of Austria
1. Prince Philippe, Count of Paris
12. Frederick Francis I, Grand Duke of Mecklenburg-Schwerin
6. Frederick Louis, Hereditary Grand Duke of Mecklenburg-Schwerin
13. Princess Louise of Saxe-Gotha-Altenburg
3. Duchess Helene of Mecklenburg-Schwerin
14. Charles Augustus, Grand Duke of Saxe-Weimar-Eisenach
7. Princess Caroline Louise of Saxe-Weimar-Eisenach
15. Princess Louise of Hesse-Darmstadt

== Bibliography ==
- Flers, Hyacinthe, marquis de. Le comte de Paris. Paris: Perrin, 1888.
- Hanson, Edward. "The Wandering Princess: Princess Hélène of France, Duchess of Aosta". Fonthill, 2017.

== See also ==
- Count of Paris

Prince Philippe, Count of Paris House of Orléans Cadet branch of the House of Bourbon Born: 24 August, 1838 Died: 8 September, 1894
Regnal titles
Preceded by Louis Philippe I	King of the French (disputed); 24 – 26 February 1848	Vacant Monarchy abolished Title next held by Napoleon III as emperor
Titles in pretence
Preceded by Louis Philippe I	— TITULAR — King of the French; Orléanist pretender 24 February 1848 – 5 August 1873	Succeeded by Claim ended
Preceded by Henri V	— TITULAR — King of France; Unionist pretender 24 August 1883 – 8 September 1894	Succeeded by Philippe VIII
French royalty
Preceded by Prince Ferdinand Philippe	Heir to the Throne as Heir apparent 13 July 1842 – 24 February 1848	Succeeded by Prince Robert, Duke of Chartres
French nobility
Preceded by Prince Ferdinand Philippe	Duke of Orléans (Never used); 13 July 1842 – 6 February 1869	Succeeded by Prince Philippe
Preceded by Title created	Count of Paris; 24 August 1838 – 8 September 1894	Succeeded by Henri, Count of Paris
