= Villamanrique de la Condesa =

- city
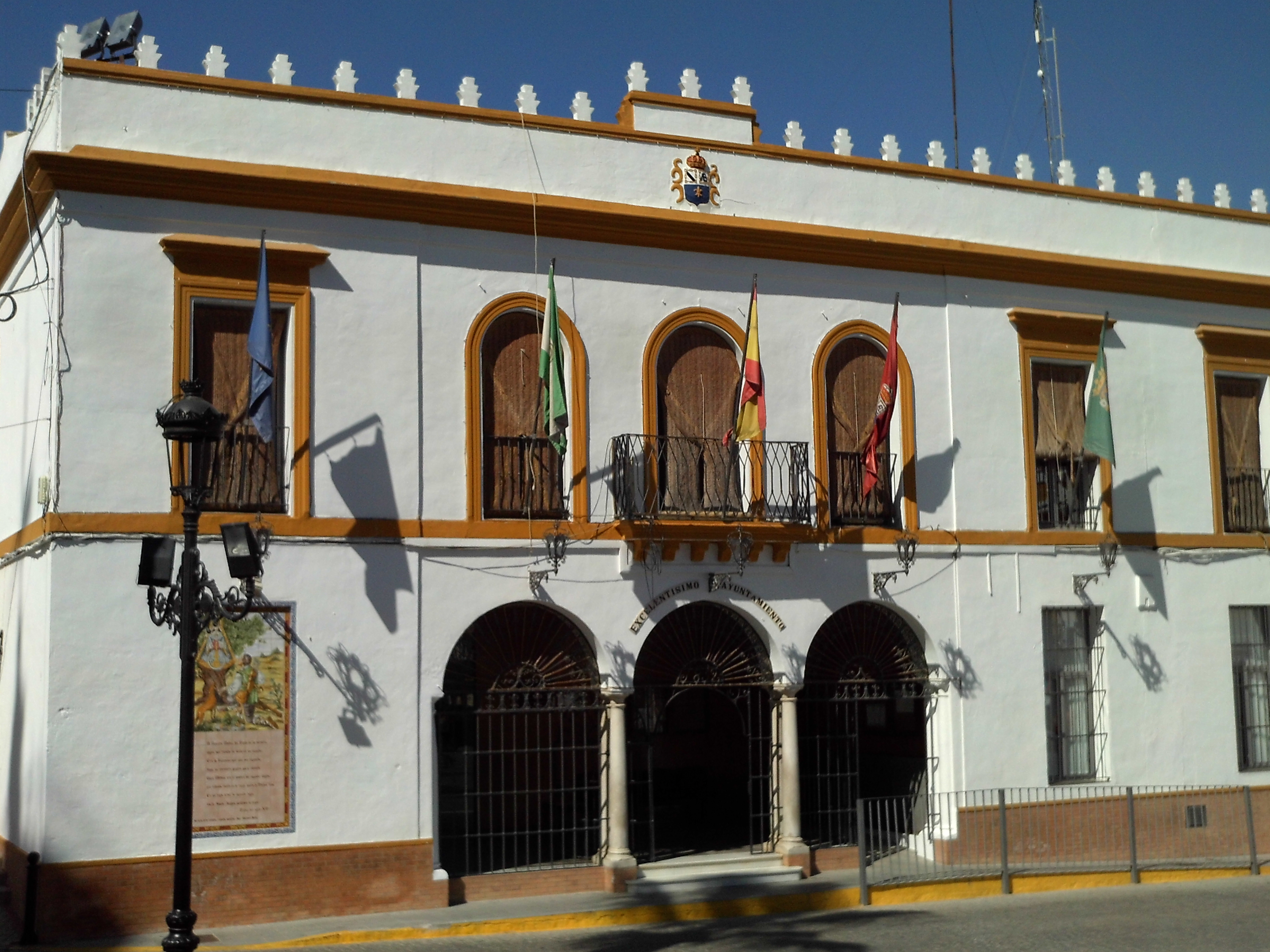
- Town hall

- Coat of arms

- Location in Spain Villamanrique de la Condesa (Andalusia) Villamanrique de la Condesa (Spain)
- Coordinates: 37°15′N 6°18′W
- Country: Spain
- Autonomous community: Andalusia
- Province: Seville
- Comarca: El Aljarafe

Government
  - Mayor: José Solís de la Rosa

Area
  - Total: 57 km^{2} (22 sq mi)

Population (2025-01-01)
  - Total: 4,694
  - Density: 82/km^{2} (210/sq mi)
- Time zone: UTC+1 (CET)
  - Summer (DST): UTC+2 (CEST)
- Website: Official website

Villamanrique de la Condesa is a city located in the province of Seville, Spain.

== Twin towns ==
- Saintes-Maries-de-la-Mer, France

== See also ==
- List of municipalities in Seville
