= Duchess of Aosta =

Wife of the Duke of Aosta

The Duchess of Aosta is the wife of the Duke of Aosta, a title created by Frederick II, Holy Roman Emperor in the 13th century. The Duchy of Aosta had already been ruled by the House of Savoy for some time; it is a corner of the Italian Alps now bordering France and Switzerland, essentially the same as the Aosta Valley. The title of duke tended to be given to the second son of the ruler, reverting to the head of the house, until Amadeo I of Spain (1845 – 1890), the first and only King of Spain from the House of Savoy. He was the second son of King Vittorio Emanuele II of Italy and was known for most of his life as the Duke of Aosta. He was elected by the Spanish parliament (the Cortes) as King of Spain in 1870, but abdicated in 1873. He created a new Aosta branch of the House of Savoy, which retains the title, although it is not legally recognised.

The duchesses have in recent centuries been royal or princely. In 2021 the duchess was Princess Olga of Greece, younger daughter of Prince Michael of Greece and Denmark.

Picture	Name	Arms	Father	Birth	Marriage	Became Duchess	Ceased to be Duchess	Death	Spouse
	Maria Theresa of Austria-Este		Archduke Ferdinand of Austria-Este (Austria-Este)	1 November 1773	21 April 1789		4 June 1802 became Queen of Sardinia	29 March 1832	Vittorio Emanuele
	Maria Vittoria dal Pozzo della Cisterna		Charles Emmanuel dal Pozzo della Cisterna (dal Pozzo della Cisterna)	9 August 1847	30 May 1863		8 November 1876		Amedeo I
	Maria Letizia Bonaparte		Prince Napoléon Bonaparte (Bonaparte)	20 November 1866	11 September 1888		18 January 1890 husband's death	25 October 1926	Amedeo I
	Hélène of Orléans		Philippe, Count of Paris (Orléans)	13 June 1871	25 June 1895		4 July 1931 husband's death	21 January 1951	Emanuele Filiberto
	Anne of Orléans		Jean, Duke of Guise (Orléans)	5 August 1906	5 November 1927	4 July 1931 husband's accession	3 March 1942 husband's death	19 March 1986	Amedeo
	Irene of Greece and Denmark		Constantine I of Greece (Schleswig-Holstein-Sonderburg-Glücksburg)	13 February 1904	1 July 1939	3 March 1942 husband's accession	29 January 1948 husband's death	15 April 1974	Aimone
	Claude of Orléans		Henri, Count of Paris (Orléans)	11 December 1943	22 July 1964		8 January 1987 marriage annulled	living	Amedeo
	Silvia Paternò di Spedalotto		Vincenzo Paternò di Spedalotto, 6th Marchese di Regiovanni (Paternò di Spedalotto)	31 December 1953	30 March 1987		1 June 2021 husband's death	living	Amedeo
	Olga of Greece		Prince Michael of Greece and Denmark (Schleswig-Holstein-Sonderburg-Glücksburg)	17 November 1971	27 September 2008	1 June 2021 husband's accession	living	living	Aimone
