= Duke of Aosta =

Italian noble title

Coat of arms of the Dukes of Aosta

Duke of Aosta (Italian: Duca d'Aosta; French: Duc d'Aoste) was a title in the Italian nobility. It was established in the 13th century when Frederick II, Holy Roman Emperor, made the County of Aosta a duchy. The region was part of the Savoyard state and the title was granted to various princes of the House of Savoy, second sons of the reigning king of Sardinia or king of Italy.

The title was re-created in 1845 for Prince Amadeo, son of Victor Emmanuel II, and thereafter held by him and his descendants until the abolition of the Italian monarchy in 1946. Two holders briefly served as kings of European countries – Prince Amadeo ruled as king of Spain from 1870 to 1873, while his grandson Prince Aimone was titular king of Croatia from 1941 to 1943 during the Italian-backed fascist regime.

The subsidiary titles of the Duke of Aosta were Prince della Cisterna and of Belriguardo, Marquess of Voghera, and Count of Ponderano, originating from the heritage of Maria Vittoria dal Pozzo, the mother of Duke Emanuele Filiberto. Ponderano was created in 1559, Voghera in 1618; Cisterna and Belriguardo as princely in 1670.

== Duke of Aosta, 1701–1715 ==
Name	Portrait	Birth	Marriages	Death
Charles Emmanuel III of Sardinia; 1701–1715		27 April 1701; Royal Palace of Turin second son of Victor Amadeus II and Anne Marie d'Orléans	(1) Anne Christine of the Palatinate-Sulzbach; 15 March 1722; Vercelli one son (2) Polyxena of Hesse-Rotenburg; 20 August 1724; Toruń six children (3) Elisabeth Therese of Lorraine; 1 April 1737; Royal Palace of Turin three children	20 February 1773; Royal Palace of Turin aged 71

== Duke of Aosta, 1723–1725 ==
Name	Portrait	Birth	Marriages	Death
Prince Vittorio Amedeo; 1723–1725		7 March 1723; Royal Palace of Turin only son of Charles Emmanuel III and Anne Christine of the Palatinate-Sulzbach	never married	11 August 1725; Royal Palace of Turin aged 2

== Duke of Aosta, 1731–1735 ==
Name	Portrait	Birth	Marriages	Death
Prince Emanuele Filiberto; 1731–1735		17 May 1731; Royal Palace of Turin second son of Charles Emmanuel III and Polyxena of Hesse-Rotenburg	never married	23 April 1735; Royal Palace of Turin aged 3

== Duke of Aosta, 1738–1745 ==
Name	Portrait	Birth	Marriages	Death
Prince Carlo Francesco; 1738–1745		1 December 1738; Royal Palace of Turin eldest son of Charles Emmanuel III and Elisabeth Therese of Lorraine	never married	25 March 1745; Royal Palace of Turin aged 6

== Duke of Aosta, 1759–1802 ==
Name	Portrait	Birth	Marriages	Death
Victor Emmanuel I of Sardinia; 1759–1802		24 July 1759; Royal Palace of Turin second son of Victor Amadeus III and Maria Antonia Ferdinanda of Spain	Maria Theresa of Austria-Este; 25 April 1789; Royal Palace of Turin seven children	10 January 1824; Castle of Moncalieri aged 64

== Duke of Aosta, 1845–present ==
Name	Portrait	Birth	Marriages	Death
Amadeo I of Spain; 1845–1890 (King of Spain; 1870–1873)		30 May 1845; Royal Palace of Turin second son of Victor Emmanuel II and Adelaide of Austria	(1) Maria Vittoria dal Pozzo; 30 May 1863; Royal Palace of Turin three sons (2) Maria Letizia Bonaparte; 11 September 1888; Royal Palace of Turin one son	18 January 1890; Royal Palace of Turin aged 44
Prince Emanuele Filiberto; 1890–1931		13 January 1869; Genoa eldest son of Amedeo and Maria Vittoria dal Pozzo	Hélène d'Orléans; 25 June 1895; Church of St. Raphael, Kingston upon Thames two sons	4 July 1931; Royal Palace of Turin aged 62
Prince Amedeo; 1931–1942		21 October 1898; Royal Palace of Turin eldest son of Emanuele Filiberto and Hélène d'Orléans	Anne d'Orléans; 5 November 1927; Naples two daughters	3 March 1942; Nairobi aged 43
Prince Aimone; 1942–1948 (King of Croatia; 1941–1943)		9 March 1900; Royal Palace of Turin second son of Emanuele Filiberto and Hélène d'Orléans	Irene of Greece and Denmark; 1 July 1939; Florence one son	29 January 1948; Buenos Aires aged 47
Prince Amedeo; 1948–2021		27 September 1943; Florence only son of Aimone and Irene of Greece and Denmark	(1) Claude d'Orléans; 22 July 1964; Sintra, Portugal three children (2) Silvia Paternò di Spedalotto; 30 March 1987; Villa Spedalotto no issue	1 June 2021; Castiglion Fibocchi aged 77
Prince Aimone; 2021–present		13 October 1967; Florence only son of Amedeo	Olga of Greece; 27 September 2008; Patmos, Greece three children	living

== See also ==
- Duchess of Aosta
