= Prince Amedeo, Duke of Aosta (1943–2021) =

Disputed Head of the House of Savoy from 1983 to 2021

Prince Amedeo
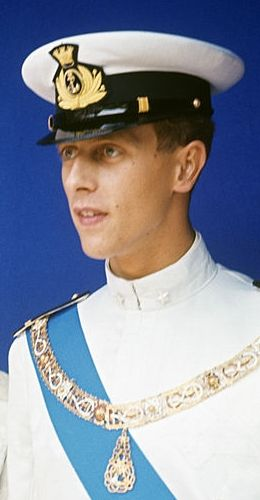
- Amedeo in 1964 wearing the collar of the Supreme Order of the Most Holy Annunciation

Head of the House of Savoy (disputed)
- Reign: 18 March 1983 – 1 June 2021
- Predecessor: Umberto II
- Successor: Aimone
- Born: 27 September 1943; Florence, Italian Social Republic
- Died: 1 June 2021 (aged 77); Arezzo, Italy
- Burial: 1 July 2021; Basilica of Superga
- Spouse: Princess Claude of Orléans (m. 1964; div. 1982) Silvia Paternò di Spedalotto (m. 1987)
- Issue: Princess Bianca; Prince Aimone, 6th Duke of Aosta; Princess Mafalda; Ginevra van Ellinkhuizen
Names
- Amedeo Umberto Costantino Giorgio Paolo Elena Maria Fiorenzo Zvonimir di Savoia
- House: Savoy
- Father: Prince Aimone, 4th Duke of Aosta
- Mother: Princess Irene of Greece and Denmark

Prince Amedeo of Savoy-Aosta, 5th Duke of Aosta (Amedeo Umberto Costantino Giorgio Paolo Elena Maria Fiorenzo Zvonimir di Savoia; 27 September 1943 – 1 June 2021) was a claimant to the headship of the House of Savoy, the family which ruled Italy from 1861 to 1946. Until 7 July 2006, Amedeo was styled Duke of Aosta; on that date he declared himself Duke of Savoy, a title that was disputed between him and his third cousin, Vittorio Emanuele, Prince of Naples, only son of King Umberto II of Italy.

== Early life ==
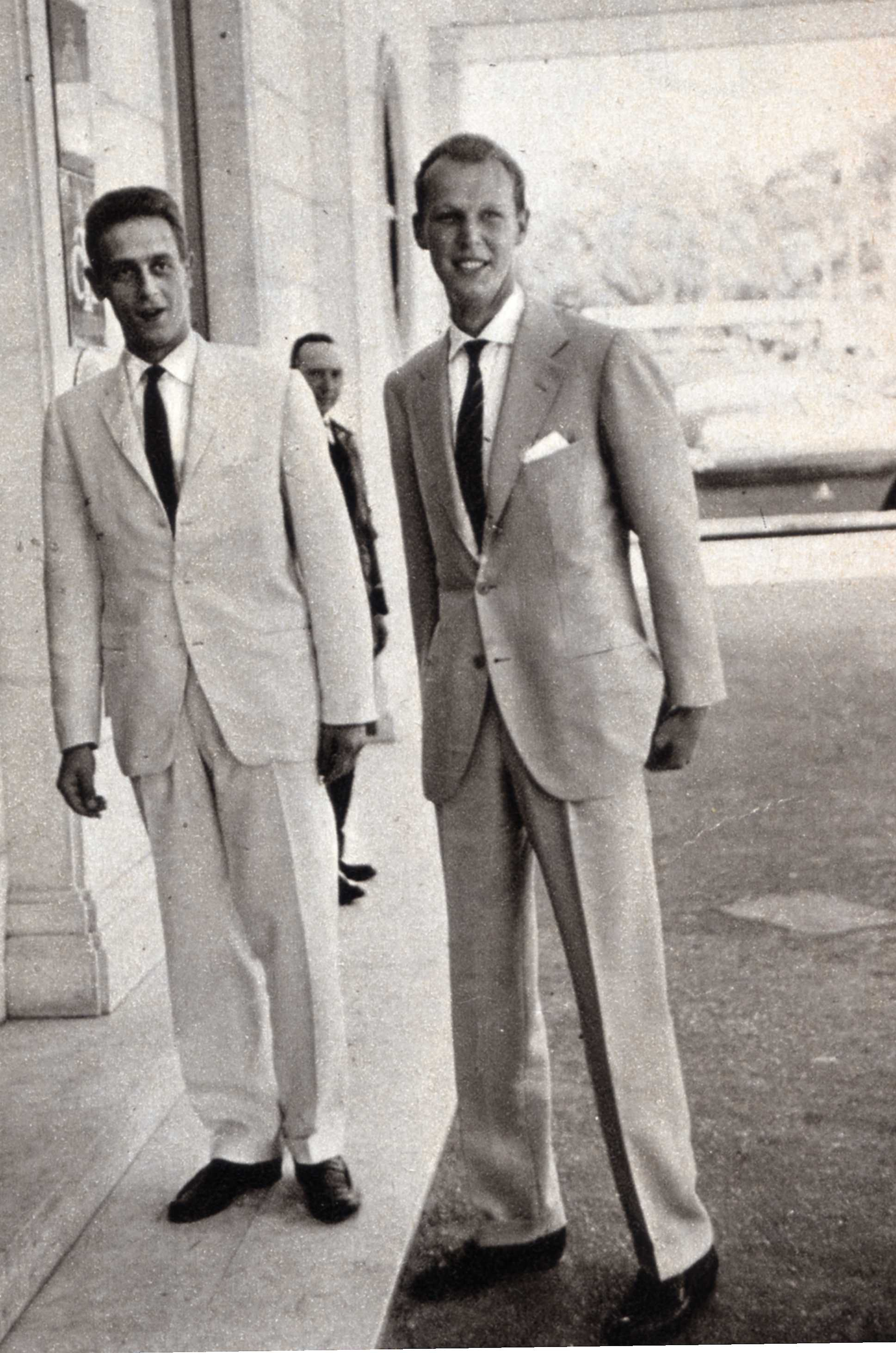
Vittorio Emanuele and Amadeo (Duke of Aosta) together in 1964, before their falling out.

Amedeo was born at Villa della Cisterna in Florence, the only child of Prince Aimone, Duke of Aosta, formerly designated king of Croatia as Tomislav II, and of Princess Irene of Greece and Denmark through whom he was a great-great-grandson of Queen Victoria.

Only three weeks before Amedeo's birth, Italy had surrendered to the Allies. His father, then king-designate of Croatia, abdicated. Italy's former ally, Germany, thereupon launched a military operation to occupy Italy. The infant Amedeo was interned by the Nazis along with his mother, aunt, and two cousins Margherita and Maria Cristina, and sent to the Hotel Ifen in Hirschegg, Austria, before being released in May 1945.

When Amedeo was only four years old, his father died in exile in Buenos Aires, and he succeeded him as Duke of Aosta, Prince della Cisterna e Belriguardo, Marchese di Voghera, and Count di Ponderano.

Amedeo studied at the Francesco Morosini Naval Military School in Venice and in England. He then attended the Naval Academy in Livorno from which he graduated as an officer in the Italian Navy.

He was an Honorary Companion of the Pennsylvania Commandery of the Military Order of the Loyal Legion of the United States, assigned insignia number 21015, as a great-grandson of Prince Philippe, Count of Paris.

Amedeo was Roman Catholic.

== Marriages and family ==
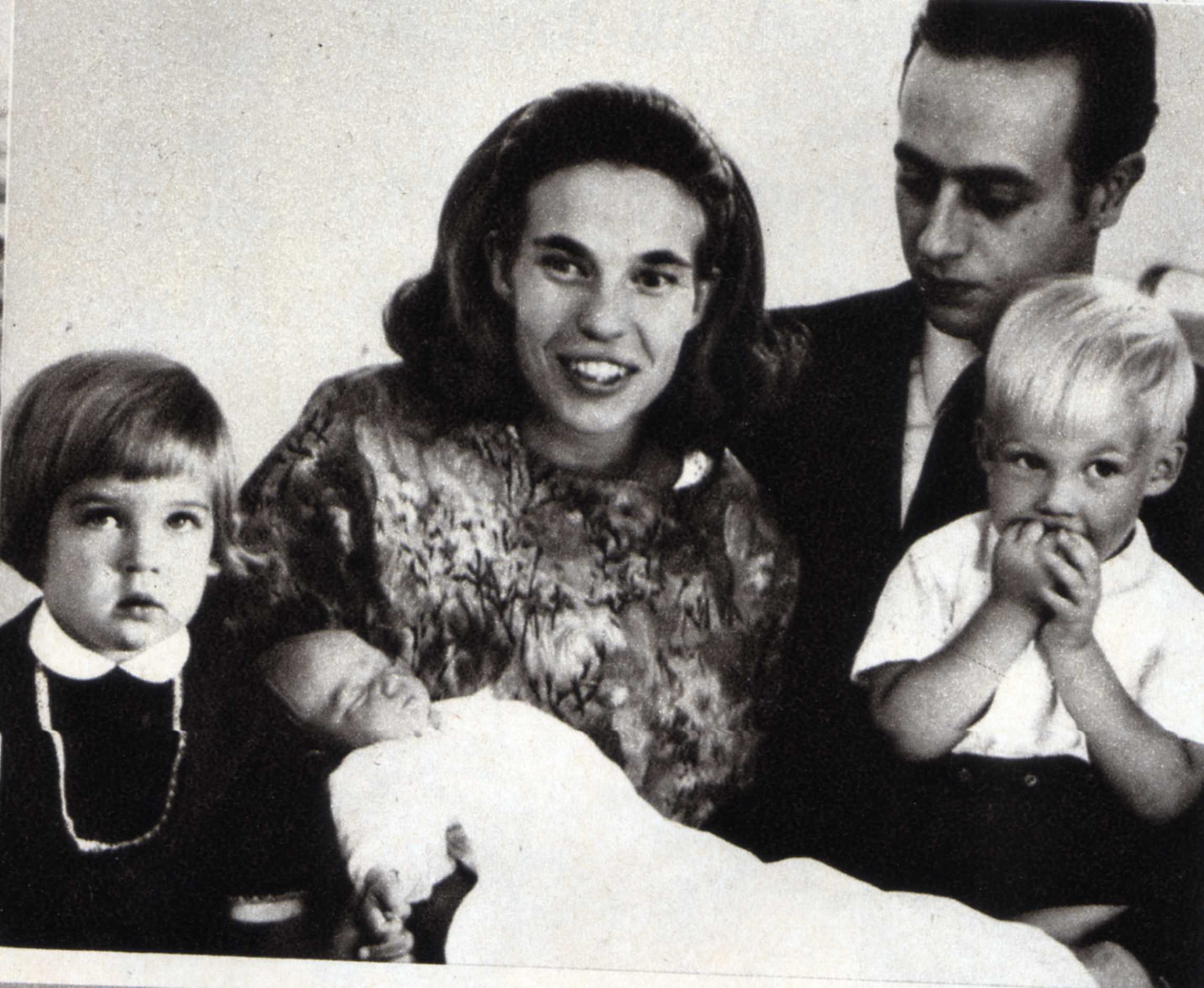
Prince Amedeo with his wife Princess Claude and their three children

=== 1st marriage and descendants ===
On 22 July 1964, at the Igreja Paroquial De São Pedro in Sintra, Portugal, Amedeo married his second cousin, Princess Claude of Orléans (born 11 December 1943). She was the ninth child and fifth daughter of Henri, comte de Paris, Orléanist claimant to the French throne, and of Princess Isabelle of Orléans-Braganza. Amedeo and Claude separated on 20 July 1976, obtained a civil divorce on 26 April 1982, and an ecclesiastical annulment from the Roman Rota on 8 January 1987. Amedeo and Claude had three children.

=== 2nd marriage ===
On 30 March 1987, Amedeo married Silvia Paternò di Spedalotto in the chapel of Villa Spedalotto in Bagheria, Sicily. She is the daughter of Vincenzo Paternò di Spedalotto, 6th Marchese di Reggiovanni, and of Rosanna Bellardo e Ferraris. Amedeo and Silvia had no children.

=== Outside of wedlock ===
Amedeo had a daughter, Ginevra van Ellinkhuizen, with Kyara van Ellinkhuizen, born outside of wedlock.

== Business activities ==
Amedeo and his wife Silvia lived in the village of San Rocco near the town of Castiglion Fibocchi in Tuscany (about 15 km or 9 1/2 miles northwest of Arezzo). He was involved in various agricultural activities, including the production of wine marketed under the name Vini Savoia Aosta.

From 1997, Amedeo was president of the International Foundation Pro Herbario Mediterraneo. From 2003 to 2006, he was president of the committee responsible for the nature reserve on the island of Vivara.

== Dynastic activities ==
Amedeo was long viewed by Italian royalists as a likely claimant to the throne if Umberto's own son, Vittorio Emanuele, Prince of Naples, failed to live up to monarchist expectations.

On 21 May 2004, following a dinner held by King Juan Carlos I of Spain at the Zarzuela Palace on the eve of the wedding of his son Felipe, Prince of Asturias, Vittorio Emanuele punched Amedeo twice in the face, causing him to fall down the steps. Former Queen Anne-Marie of Greece caught Amedeo to prevent him further injuring himself and helped him indoors, staunching his bleeding face until first aid could be administered. Upon learning of the incident, Juan Carlos reportedly declared that "never again" would an opportunity to abuse his hospitality be afforded to the competing pretenders.

On 7 July 2006, Amedeo declared himself to be the Head of the House of Savoy and Duke of Savoy, claiming that in 1971, Vittorio Emanuele had lost his dynastic rights when he married without previously obtaining the permission of Umberto II, authorization which had been required under monarchical law. However, there have been claims that consent could also be granted after the wedding.

In addition, there were disputes over the surname used by Amedeo. In 2009, Vittorio Emanuele and his son, Emanuele Filiberto, Prince of Venice, sought judicial intervention to forbid Amedeo's use of the surname di Savoia. In February 2010, the court of Arezzo ruled that the Amedeo and his son Aimone must pay damages totalling 50,000 euros to their cousins and cease using the surname di Savoia instead of di Savoia-Aosta. Amedeo's claim received the support of Vittorio Emanuele's sister, Princess Maria Gabriella of Savoy. However, the verdict was overturned on appeal, with the court of second resort allowing Amedeo the use of the short surname, in the form of di Savoia, and additionally revoking the financial penalty originally imposed on him.

Although many monarchists transferred their allegiance to Amedeo at some point after King Umberto's death, Amedeo was criticised by other Italian royalists who continue to support Prince Vittorio Emanuele. Sergio Pellecchi, President of the Giunta of the Chivalric Orders of the House of Savoy, has stated that the Council of the Senators of the Kingdom was dissolved in 2002 and that it never had any authority in matters of the succession. Eugenio Armando Dondero, spokesman for the Coordinamento Monarchico Italiano, has asked why Amedeo did not claim to be head of the House of Savoy in 1983 when Umberto II died. But others, including constitutional jurist Guido Locatello, declared the marriage of Vittorio Emanuele to be in violation of Savoy dynastic law years before the scandal evoked any clamour for Amedeo to replace him. The Unione Monarchica Italiana published in its newsletter, Monarchia Nuova, on 12 February 1987 that the Prince of Naples' marriage to Marina Doria violated the decree of Victor Amadeus III, issued 13 September 1780, regulating the marriages of princes of the blood royal, compelling the Unione to recognise Amedeo as rightful head of the royal house—although at that time Aosta had put forth no public dynastic claim.

Amedeo was a Knight of the Supreme Order of the Most Holy Annunciation named by Umberto II, a Grand Cross of the Order of Saints Maurice and Lazarus named by his cousin Vittorio Emanuele, and a Knight of Honor and Devotion of the Sovereign Military Order of St. John of Jerusalem. He was an honorary citizen of the towns of Marigliano, Pantelleria, and Abetone. Along with his claim to be Head of the House of Savoy, Amedeo also claimed to be Grand Master of all the house orders.

== Death ==
Prince Amedeo died on 1 June 2021, at the age of 77, in Arezzo, Italy, from cardiac arrest after undergoing surgery on 27 May.

== Ancestors ==
Ancestors of Prince Amedeo, Duke of Aosta (1943–2021)

8. Amadeo I of Spain
4. Emanuele Filiberto, 2nd Duke of Aosta
9. Maria Vittoria dal Pozzo, 6th Princess of La Cisterna
2. Prince Aimone, Duke of Aosta
10. Prince Philippe, Count of Paris
5. Princess Hélène of Orléans
11. Princess Marie Isabelle of Orléans
1. Prince Amedeo, Duke of Aosta
12. George I of Greece
6. Constantine I of Greece
13. Grand Duchess Olga Constantinovna of Russia
3. Princess Irene of Greece and Denmark
14. Frederick III, German Emperor
7. Princess Sophia of Prussia
15. Victoria, Princess Royal

Prince Amedeo, Duke of Aosta (1943–2021) House of Savoy Born: 27 September 1943 Died: 1 June 2021
Italian nobility
Preceded by Aimone, 4th Duke of Aosta	5th Duke of Aosta; 7th creation 1948–2021	Succeeded by Aimone, 6th Duke of Aosta
Titles in pretence
Preceded by Umberto II	— TITULAR — King of Italy (disputed); 1983–2021; Reason for succession failure: Kingdom abolished in 1946	Succeeded by Aimone
