= Princess Irene of Greece and Denmark (disambiguation) =

Princess Irene of Greece and Denmark may refer to:

- Princess Irene, Duchess of Aosta (1904–1974), daughter of Constantine I of Greece and Sophia of Prussia
- Princess Irene of Greece and Denmark (born 1942), daughter of Paul of Greece and Frederica of Hanover
