= Petronilla Tovo =

Italian painter

Petronilla Tovo (Turin, 19th century) was an Italian painter, specializing in painting miniatures on ivory. She is known for portraits of the Duke and Duchess d'Aosta; Prince Tommaso; Prince of Carignano; and the two sons of Duke of Aosta; and portrait of a young woman in antique and modern costume. She also painted landscapes and still lifes, and at the 1880 Turin Exposition, she exhibited Vaso con fiori and two landscapes She is likely related to Emanuele Tovo.
