= Margherita, Archduchess of Austria-Este =

Italian princess (1930–2022)

Archduchess Margherita
- Archduchess of Austria-Este
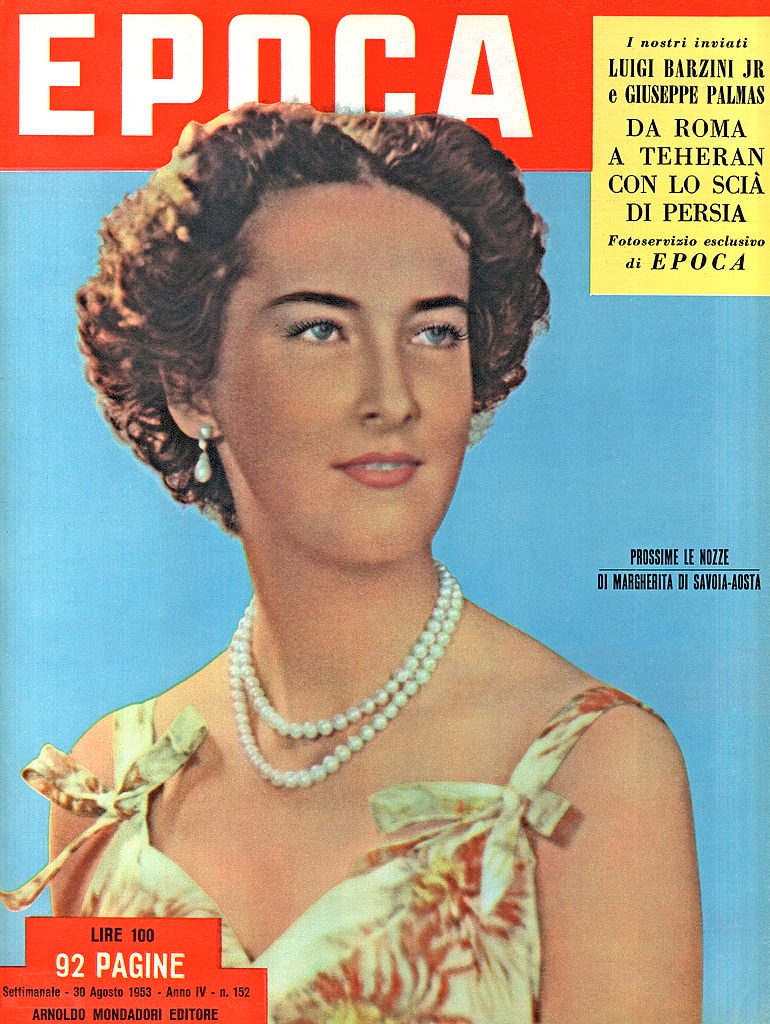
- Princess Margherita on 30 August 1953 cover of Epoca
- Born: 7 April 1930; Palace of Capodimonte, Naples, Italy
- Died: 10 January 2022 (aged 91); Basel, Switzerland
- Spouse: Robert, Archduke of Austria-Este (m. 1953; died 1996)
- Issue Detail: Archduchess Maria Beatrice; Prince Lorenz, Archduke of Austria-Este; Archduke Gerhard; Archduke Martin; Archduchess Isabella
Names
- Margherita Isabella Maria Vittoria Emanuela Elena Gennara
- House: Savoy
- Father: Amedeo, 3rd Duke of Aosta
- Mother: Princess Anne d'Orléans

Margherita, Archduchess of Austria-Este (née Princess Margherita of Savoy-Aosta, 7 April 1930 – 10 January 2022) was an Italian princess, the first-born child of Amedeo, 3rd Duke of Aosta, and Princess Anne d'Orléans.

== Biography ==
Margherita, born in the Royal Palace of Capodimonte, Naples on 7 April 1930, is the eldest daughter of Prince Amedeo of Savoy, Duke of Aosta, and Princess Anne d'Orléans, first cousins married in 1927. She has a younger sister, Marie Christine (born in 1933). The princess was baptised in the chapel of the Capodimonte Palace on 28 May 1930 with the names Margherita Isabella Maria Vittoria Emanuela Elena Gennara. Her godparents were the King of Italy Victor Emmanuel III and her paternal grandmother Princess Hélène d'Orléans.

Her father, the Duke of Aosta, was appointed Viceroy of Ethiopia on 21 December 1937, and Margherita spent part of her childhood in Africa. In 1940, she returned to Italy with her mother and her younger sister, Marie Christine, shortly before the outbreak of the Second World War. Her father, taken prisoner by the British, died prematurely of typhus in captivity in Nairobi on 3 March 1942.

At the beginning of the Second World War, Margherita lived with her sister and mother in a flat in the Pitti Palace in Florence. In 1943, Germany invaded Italy. In July 1944, the Duchess of Aosta and her two daughters were arrested by the Germans and deported to the Hotel Ifen in Hirschegg, Austria, before being released in May 1945 and returning to Italy on 7 July. The fall of the Italian monarchy in June 1946 forced Margherita, her mother and her sister to leave the country and settle in Belgium, where they stayed for just over a year, before moving to Switzerland.

=== Marriage and issue ===
Margherita's family announced her engagement to Robert, Archduke of Austria-Este, on 20 October 1953. They married on 28 December in Bourg-en-Bresse, Ain, France (civilly) and 29 December (religiously), in Royal Monastery of Brou. He was the second son of former Emperor Charles I of Austria and Zita of Bourbon-Parma. Robert was 38, and Margherita was 23. As the royal couple arrived for the first ceremony, hundreds of Austrians and Italians stood outside the town hall where the marriage was held. The wedding was also attended by former King Umberto II of Italy and Robert's older brother Otto of Habsburg, the claimant to the Austrian throne. At six feet tall, Margherita was, according to some witnesses, an impressive sight. She wore an ivory gown made out of satin with a long train hung from a diamond tiara.

The couple took up residence in Paris, where Robert was a bank clerk. They had five children:

- Archduchess Maria Beatrice (born 11 December 1954) married on 26 April 1980 in Chartres Count Riprand of Arco-Zinneberg, a great-grandson of the last Bavarian king, Ludwig III and of Maria Theresia, Archduchess of Austria-Este. They have six daughters:
  - Countess Anna Theresa von und zu Arco-Zinneberg (born 1981) married on 29 September 2018, at Niederaltaich Abbey in Bavaria, Colin McKenzie (born 1976). They have two children.
    - Josephine McKenzie (born 2019)
    - Jasper McKenzie (born 2022)
  - Countess Margherita von und zu Arco-Zinneberg (born 1983) married on 19 March 2022, in Moos, Bavaria, Charles Douglas Green (born 1981)
  - Countess Olympia von und zu Arco-Zinneberg (born 4 January 1988) married on 17 October 2019, in Neuilly-sur-Seine, France, Jean-Christophe, Prince Napoléon (born 1986). They have one son.
    - Louis Charles Napoleon (7 December 2022)
  - Countess Maximiliana von und zu Arco-Zinneberg (born 1990) married on 17 May 2023, in Moos, Bavaria, Byron Houdayer (born 1986)
  - Countess Marie Gabrielle von und zu Arco-Zinneberg (born 1992), who is a mezzo-soprano opera singer
  - Countess Giorgiana von und zu Arco-Zinneberg (born 1997)
- Prince Lorenz of Belgium, Archduke of Austria-Este (born 16 December 1955) married on 22 September 1984 at Brussels, Princess Astrid of Belgium (born 1962), daughter of Albert II, King of the Belgians. They have five children:
  - Prince Amedeo of Belgium, Hereditary Archduke of Austria-Este (born 1986) married Elisabetta Rosboch von Wolkenstein on 5 July 2014 in Rome, Italy. They have three children.
    - Archduchess Anna Astrid (17 May 2016)
    - Archduke Maximilian (6 September 2019)
    - Archduchess Alix (2 September 2023)
  - Princess Maria Laura of Belgium, Archduchess of Austria-Este (born 1988) married William Isvy (born 1991) on 10 September 2022 in Brussels, Belgium. They have one son:
    - Albert Isvy (26 January 2025)
  - Prince Joachim of Belgium, Archduke of Austria-Este (born 1991)
  - Princess Luisa Maria of Belgium, Archduchess of Austria-Este (born 1995)
  - Princess Laetitia Maria of Belgium, Archduchess of Austria-Este (born 2003)
- Archduke Gerhard (born 30 October 1957) married in 2015 Iris Jandrasits (born 1961).
- Archduke Martin (born 21 December 1959) married in 2004 Princess Katharina of Isenburg, sister of Sophie, Princess of Prussia and Isabelle, Princess of Wied. They have four children:
  - Archduke Bartholomaeus of Austria (2006)
  - Archduke Emmanuel of Austria (2008)
  - Archduchess Helene of Austria (2009)
  - Archduke Luigi of Austria (2011)
- Archduchess Isabella (born 2 March 1963) married in 1997 Count Andrea Czarnocki-Lucheschi. They have four children:
  - Alvise Czarnocki-Lucheschi (1999)
  - Carlo Amedeo Czarnocki-Lucheschi (2000)
  - Maria Anna Czarnocki-Lucheschi (2002)
  - Alessandro Czarnocki-Lucheschi (2004)

== Ancestry ==
Ancestors of Margherita, Archduchess of Austria-Este

8. Amadeo I of Spain
4. Prince Emanuele Filiberto, Duke of Aosta
9. Maria Vittoria dal Pozzo, 6th Princess della Cisterna
2. Prince Amedeo, Duke of Aosta
10. Prince Philippe, Count of Paris (= 14)
5. Princess Hélène of Orléans
11. Princess Marie Isabelle of Orléans (= 15)
1. Princess Margherita of Savoy-Aosta
12. Prince Robert, Duke of Chartres
6. Prince Jean, Duke of Guise
13. Princess Françoise of Orléans
3. Princess Anne of Orléans
14. Prince Philippe, Count of Paris (= 10)
7. Princess Isabelle of Orléans
15. Princess Marie Isabelle of Orléans (= 11)
