= Princess Claude of Orléans =

French princess

Princess Claude
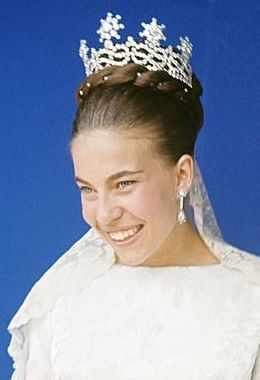
- Claude on the day of her marriage to Prince Amedeo, Duke of Aosta, on 22 July 1964
- Born: 11 December 1943 (age 82); Larache, Spanish Morocco
- Spouses: Prince Amedeo, Duke of Aosta (m. 1964; div. 1982) Arnaldo La Cagnina (m. 1982; div. 1996) Enrico Gandolfi (m. 2006; died 2015)
- Issue: Princess Bianca, Countess Arrivabene-Valenti-Gonzaga; Prince Aimone, Duke of Aosta; Princess Mafalda, Baroness Lombardo di San Chirico
Names
- Claude Marie Agnès Catherine d'Orléans
- House: Orléans
- Father: Henri, Count of Paris
- Mother: Princess Isabelle of Orléans-Braganza

Princess Claude of Orléans (Claude Marie Agnès Catherine; born 11 December 1943) is a French princess of the House of Orléans. She is the former wife of Prince Amedeo, Duke of Aosta, a disputed head of the House of Savoy.

== Biography ==
=== Family ===
Claude was born on 11 December 1943 in Larache, Morocco as the ninth child and fifth daughter of Henri, Count of Paris, Orléanist claimant to the French throne, and Princess Isabelle of Orléans-Braganza.

One of eleven siblings, Claude's eldest brother was Henri, Count of Paris, who succeeded their father as head of the Orléans family, and two of her sisters also became consorts of pretenders to abolished thrones; Anne, Duchess of Calabria and Diane, Duchess of Württemberg. Upon repatriation to France after the law of banishment against her father was repealed in 1950, her family moved from Sintra, on the Portuguese Riviera to France, where they grew up at the Manoir Cœur-Volant in the Louveciennes suburb of Paris.

=== Education ===
She began school in Portugal at Lisbon's Saint-Louis-des-Français. She then spent some time at the Mayfield School in East Sussex, England. In France, she and her sisters received private instruction, and she completed her studies at the Institut Sainte-Marie in Neuilly-sur-Seine.

=== Marriage and issue ===
On 22 July 1964 in Sintra, Princess Claude married her second cousin, Prince Amedeo of Savoy, Duke of Aosta. He was the only son of Prince Aimone, Duke of Aosta, second cousin once removed of Italy's last king, Umberto II. Aimone was briefly made nominal head of an Italian puppet state during World War II as King Tomislav II of Croatia. Claude was the third Orleanist princess to hold the title Duchess of Aosta by marriage.

At the time of their wedding, Amedeo was a student at the Morosini Naval College in Venice, which his father had also attended. The couple met while attending the wedding of Infante Juan Carlos of Spain and Princess Sophia of Greece and Denmark in May 1962 in Athens. They announced their engagement on 4 October 1963. The couple married in São Pedro de Penaferrim, a parish church twelve miles from Lisbon.

The wedding had been planned for earlier in the month, but was rescheduled when King Umberto (godfather of the groom) was hospitalized for an abdominal operation. A Savoy family council having met at King Umberto's residence in exile at Cimiez, France, in the summer of 1963, another was held in London secretly at the king's hospital bedside to discuss the prospect of the king's only son Vittorio Emanuele, Prince of Naples, choosing to marry a commoner, Marina Doria, which had become the subject of much media speculation. In view of his illness, Amedeo's imminent marriage to a suitable princess, and his son's ongoing relationship with Doria, Umberto contemplated publicly abdicating (having left Italy for exile in 1946 pursuant to an anti-monarchy plebiscite, he had not formally renounced) and recognizing Amedeo as the successor to his claim to Italy's abolished throne. Present at this meeting, along with the princes Vittorio Emanuele and Amedeo, was Umberto's estranged consort, Queen Marie-José, whose objections dissuaded the king from issuing a declaration. Instead, Amedeo announced that he would postpone his wedding for the duration of Umberto's convalescence to ensure his presence at the nuptials, while Vittorio Emanuele issued a statement affirming that he remained his father's rightful heir and had no intention of marrying Marina Doria (nonetheless, he would do so, without his father's declared consent, in 1970). The wedding was attended by 300 guests, including King Umberto and the Prince and Princess of Spain. Two days later the newlyweds received a nuptial blessing during an audience with Pope Paul VI in the Vatican.

After the duke completed his duties as a naval officer, the couple were given the Borro by Aimone's mother, a large estate in the Tuscan village of San Giustino Valdarno, near Fiesole, Italy, where they cultivated vineyards. Occasionally they undertook dynastic responsibilities as representatives in Italy of King Umberto, but largely raised their children in the countryside.

They had three children:

- Princess Bianca of Savoy-Aosta (b. Florence, 2 April 1966), married on 11 September 1988 in San Giustino Valdarno, Giberto, Count Arrivabene-Valenti-Gonzaga (b. Rome, 5 July 1961), son of Leonardo, Count Arrivabene-Valenti-Gonzaga and Maria delle Grazie Brandolini d'Adda, and they have five children:
  - Countess Viola Arrivabene-Valenti-Gonzaga (b. Rome, 31 May 1991) who is married to Charlie Siem.
  - Countess Vera Arrivabene-Valenti-Gonzaga (b. Samedan, 18 August 1993) who is married to Count Briano Martinoni Caleppio.
  - Countess Mafalda Arrivabene-Valenti-Gonzaga (b. Conegliano Veneto, 27 December 1997)
  - Countess Maddalena Arrivabene-Valenti-Gonzaga (b. Conegliano Veneto, 24 April 2000)
  - Count Leonardo Arrivabene-Valenti-Gonzaga (b. Conegliano Veneto, 5 October 2001)
- Prince Aimone of Savoy-Aosta (b. Florence, 13 October 1967); married in a civil ceremony on 16 September 2008, Princess Olga of Greece (b. Athens, 17 November 1971). The religious marriage took place on 27 September at Patmos, Greece, and they have three children:
  - Prince Umberto of Savoy-Aosta (b. Paris, 7 March 2009)
  - Prince Amedeo of Savoy-Aosta (b. Paris, 24 May 2011)
  - Princess Isabella of Savoy-Aosta (b. Paris, 14 December 2012)
- Princess Mafalda of Savoy-Aosta (b. 20 September 1969); married, firstly, Don Alessandro Ruffo di Calabria-Santapau dei principi di Palazzolo (nephew of Queen Paola of Belgium), divorced without issue. Mafalda married, secondly, Nobile Francesco Ferrante Carlo Napoleone, 10th Baron Lombardo di San Chirico and they have three children:
  - Nob. Anna Lombardo di San Chirico (b. Milan, 11 April 2002)
  - Nob. Carlo Lombardo di San Chirico (b. Milan, 28 January 2003)
  - Nob. Elena Lombardo di San Chirico (b. Milan, 10 March 2004)

=== Divorce ===
Amedeo and Claude officially separated 20 July 1976, obtained a civil divorce 26 April 1982, and received an ecclesiastical annulment from the Roman Rota on 8 January 1987. Amedeo was remarried later that year to Silvia Paternò di Spedalotto, while Claude remarried twice: civilly on 27 April 1982 in Port-au-Prince, Haiti with Luigi Arnaldo La Cagnina (divorced in 1996), a television journalist in the United States and Canada, and both civilly and religiously with Enrico Gandolfi in 2006 in Oreno, Milan. Gandolfi died on 27 October 2015 in Laterina.

=== Activities ===
During her second marriage, Claude lived in the United States (Colebrook, Connecticut, Charleston, West Virginia and New York), in The Bahamas, and returned to Europe (Alsace and the Principality of Andorra). Beginning in 1992 their restaurant in Brussels, "Brook's Bar", became a popular gathering place for European Parliament officials, but closed in 1995. During her third marriage, she lived largely in Italy.

Professionally, she has managed public relations for the Italian couture studio, Liolà, and her efforts in macrophotography have been displayed in several exhibits.
