= Emanuele Tovo =

Italian painter

Emanuele Tovo (Turin, 19th century) was an Italian painter, mainly a prolific creator of portrait miniatures for the House of Savoy, but also of larger portraits and landscapes.

== Biography ==
He was born and resided in Turin. He completed portraits, in miniature on ivory, of Vittorio Emanuele II, King Umberto I, Queen Margherita, Princess Elisabetta, the Duchess of Genoa and the Prince of Naples. Other works in miniature on ivory are L' Aurora, Zefiro e Flora and Dio Pane e Ninfe, exhibited in Turin. Among his paintings are two landscapes depicting Alpine regions and another titled Una mosca ed una formica. He is likely related to the painter Petronilla Tovo .
