= Princess Astrid of Belgium =

Archduchess of Austria-Este (born 1962)

Princess Astrid
- Archduchess of Austria-Este (more); Duchess of Ferrara and Modena (more)
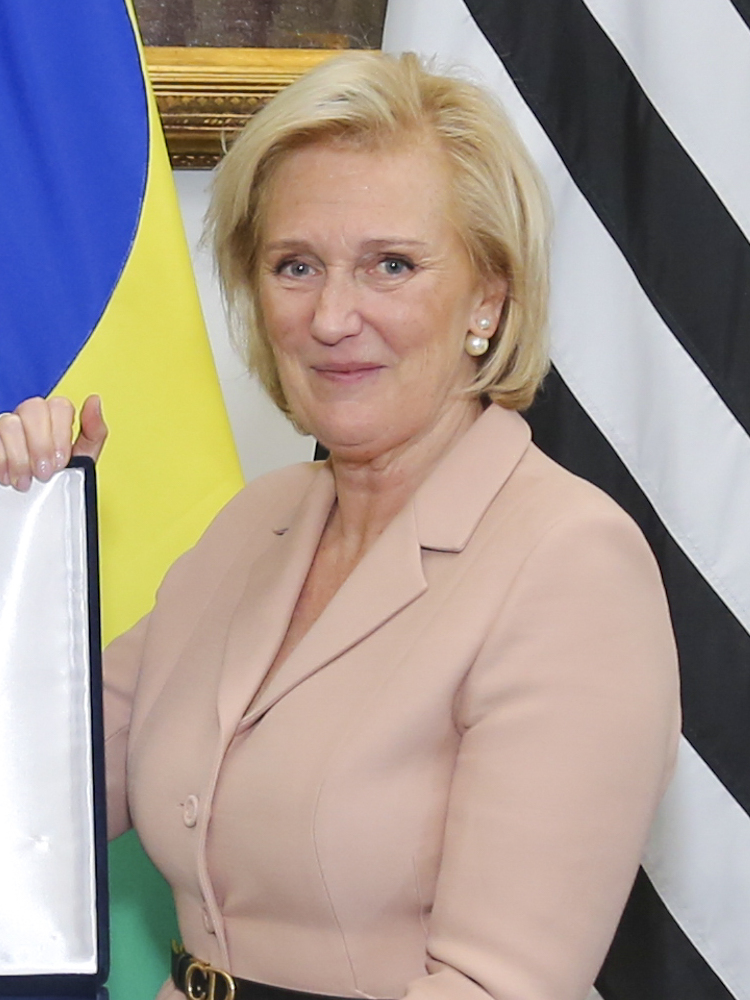
- Princess Astrid in 2022
- Born: 5 June 1962 (age 64); Belvédère Château, Laeken, Brussels, Belgium
- Spouse: Lorenz, Archduke of Austria-Este (m. 1984)
- Issue: Prince Amedeo; Princess Maria Laura; Prince Joachim; Princess Luisa Maria; Princess Laetitia Maria
Names
- Astrid Joséphine-Charlotte Fabrizia Elisabeth Paola Marie
- House: Belgium
- Father: Albert II of Belgium
- Mother: Paola Ruffo di Calabria

Princess Astrid of Belgium, Archduchess of Austria-Este, Duchess of Ferrara and Modena (born 5 June 1962), is the second child and first daughter of King Albert II and Queen Paola, and the younger sister to the current Belgian monarch, King Philippe. She is married to Prince Lorenz of Belgium, head of the Austria-Este branch of the House of Habsburg-Lorraine, and is fifth in line of succession to the Belgian throne.

== Biography ==
Princess Astrid was born one day before her father's 28th birthday at the Belvédère Château in Laeken, northern Brussels, and was named after her late paternal grandmother, Astrid of Sweden, King Leopold III's popular first wife, who had died in 1935 in a car accident aged 29. Princess Astrid's godparents were her uncle Fabrizio, Prince Ruffo di Calabria-Santapau, 7th Duke di Guardia Lombarda, and her aunt Hereditary Grand Duchess Joséphine-Charlotte of Luxembourg.

=== Marriage and issue ===
Princess Astrid married Archduke Lorenz of Austria-Este, subsequently head of the House of Austria-Este, on 22 September 1984 at the Church of Our Lady of Victories at the Sablon in Brussels. Lorenz is the eldest son of Robert, Archduke of Austria-Este (1915–1996) and Princess Margherita of Savoy-Aosta (1930–2022). Her husband was also created Belgian Prince by Royal Decree on 27 November 1995.

Princess Astrid and Prince Lorenz have five children:

- Prince Amedeo Maria Josef Carl Pierre Philippe Paola Marcus d'Aviano of Belgium, Archduke of Austria-Este (born on 21 February 1986 at Cliniques universitaires Saint-Luc in Woluwé-Saint-Lambert, Brussels). Married Elisabetta "Lili" Maria Rosboch von Wolkenstein on 5 July 2014 in Rome's Basilica of Santa Maria in Trastevere. They have three children: (Note: Due to a royal decree issued by his uncle King Philippe, which limits the range of family members bearing the title "Prince of Belgium", Amedeo's children do not bear the princely title nor the style of Royal Highness.)
  - Archduchess Anna Astrid Marie of Austria-Este (born on 17 May 2016)
  - Archduke Maximilian Joseph Lorenz Ettore Karl Marcus d'Aviano of Austria-Este (born on 6 September 2019)
  - Archduchess Alix Lorenza Anne Marie Josephine of Austria-Este (born on 2 September 2023)
- Princess Maria Laura Zita Beatrix Gerhard of Belgium, Archduchess of Austria-Este (born on 26 August 1988 at Cliniques universitaires Saint-Luc in Woluwé-Saint-Lambert, Brussels), married William Mark Isvy (b. 9 March 1991) on 10 September 2022 at the Cathedral of St. Michael and St. Gudula in Brussels. They have one son:
  - Albert Isvy (born on 26 January 2025)
- Prince Joachim Karl-Maria Nikolaus Isabelle Marcus d'Aviano of Belgium, Archduke of Austria-Este (born on 9 December 1991 at Cliniques universitaires Saint-Luc in Woluwé-Saint-Lambert, Brussels).
- Princess Luisa Maria Anna Martine Pilar of Belgium, Archduchess of Austria-Este (born 11 October 1995 at Clinique St Jean in Woluwé-Saint-Lambert, Brussels).
- Princess Laetitia Maria Nora Anna Joachim Zita of Belgium, Archduchess of Austria-Este (born on 23 April 2003 at Clinique St Jean in Woluwé-Saint-Lambert, Brussels).

== Royal role ==
Astrid was formerly President of the Belgian Red Cross, a position which ended on 31 December 2007. She declined to stand again for election to the role in light of internal struggles in the organisation in reconciling its Flemish-speaking and French branches, each of which seeks greater autonomy. The princess is also a colonel in the Belgian Medical Service of the Belgian Armed Forces. Her official residence is the Royal Castle of Laeken on the edge of Brussels.

She is a member of the Honorary Board of the International Paralympic Committee.

In April 2015, the Princess took over the Prince Albert Fund from her father King Albert.

=== Special Envoy ===
Princess Astrid has been for many years an advocate for landmine survivors' rights, participating actively in the work of the Anti-Personnel Mine Ban Convention, also known as the Ottawa Treaty, since Belgium joined in 1998.

In 2013, the Princess was named Special Envoy of the convention, and has promoted the acceptance of a global ban on landmines and promoted the rights of survivors in various UN meetings.

In 2019, she carried out a mission to Lebanon to promote the convention. In Beirut she met with President Michel Aoun, and Minister of National Defense Elias Bou Saab.

== Titles, styles and honours ==
Styles of Princess Astrid, Archduchess of Austria-Este
- Reference style: Her Imperial and Royal Highness
- Spoken style: Your Imperial and Royal Highness

=== Titles ===
- 5 June 1962 – 22 September 1984: Her Royal Highness Princess Astrid of Belgium
- 22 September 1984 – present: Her Imperial and Royal Highness Princess Astrid of Belgium, Archduchess of Austria-Este, Duchess of Ferrara and Modena (Note: She has held the title "Princess of Belgium" from birth under Belgian law. By marriage to an archduke of the house of Austria-Este, she gained, in addition to her native title, the style "Imperial and Royal Highness" and the title "Archduchess of Austria-Este". Upon her husband's succeeding to the headship of his house in 1996, as wife of the Archduke of Austria-Este, internationally or depending on the situation, she is also accorded the traditional title "Her Imperial and Royal Highness The Archduchess of Austria-Este" or, more formally, reflecting both her native and marital titles, is addressed as HI&RH Princess Astrid of Belgium, Archduchess of Austria-Este. Her children by Archduke Lorenz bear the titles "Prince(ss) of Belgium" by Belgian decree of 2 December 1991, in addition to their Austrian titles borne by tradition, "Archduke/Archduchess of Austria".)

=== Honours ===
==== National ====
- Belgium: Knight Grand Cross of the Order of Leopold I

==== Foreign ====
- Germany: Grand Cross, 1st Class of the Order of Merit of the Federal Republic of Germany
- Hungary: Grand Cross of the Order of Merit of the Republic of Hungary
- Luxembourg: Knight Grand Cross of the Order of Adolphe of Nassau
- Netherlands: Knight Grand Cross of the Order of the Crown
- Norway: Knight Grand Cross of the Order of Merit
- Palestine:
  - (Vatican City) Latin Catholic Patriarchate of Jerusalem: Knight Grand Cross of the Order of the Holy Sepulchre
- Portugal: Grand Cross of the Order of Prince Henry
- Spain: Knight Grand Cross of the Order of Civil Merit
- Sweden: Knight Grand Cross of the Royal Order of the Polar Star

=== Awards ===
- Peru: Freedom of the City of Lima
- South Korea
  - Seoul: Honorary Citizen of Seoul

==== Other ====
2016 : Honorary mayor and The Hidalgo Award of San Antonio, Texas.

== Arms ==
Coat of arms of Princess Astrid of Belgium
Notes As a Princess of Belgium and a descendant of King Leopold I, the Princess is entitled to use a coat of arms which was stipulated in the Royal Decree of King Philippe in 2019. Adopted 12 July 2019 Coronet Princely crown of Belgium Escutcheon On a lozenge, sable, a lion rampant or, armed and langued gules (Belgium), on the shoulder an escutcheon barry of ten sable and or, a crancelin vert (Wettin), overall a bordure or. Supporters Two lions guardant proper Motto French: L'union fait la force Dutch: Eendracht maakt macht German: Einigkeit macht stark Other elements The whole is placed on a mantle purpure with ermine lining, fringes and tassels or and ensigned with the Royal crown of Belgium.

== Ranks ==
- 23 May 1997 – 26 December 2003: Belgian Medical Component, Lieutenant-colonel
- 26 December 2003 – : Belgian Medical Component, Colonel
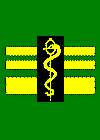
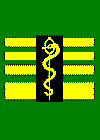
1997
2003

== Notes ==
Princess Astrid of Belgium House of Belgium Born: 5 June 1962
Belgian royalty
Preceded by Princess Eléonore of Belgium	Line of succession to the Belgian throne 5th position	Succeeded by Prince Amedeo of Belgium
Titles in pretence
Preceded by Princess Margherita of Savoy-Aosta	— TITULAR — Duchess Consort of Modena; 7 February 1996 – present Reason for succession failure: Duchy of Modena merged into the Unification of Italy	Incumbent
