= Prince Lorenz of Belgium =

Archduke of Austria-Este (born 1955)

Prince Lorenz
- Archduke of Austria-Este (more)
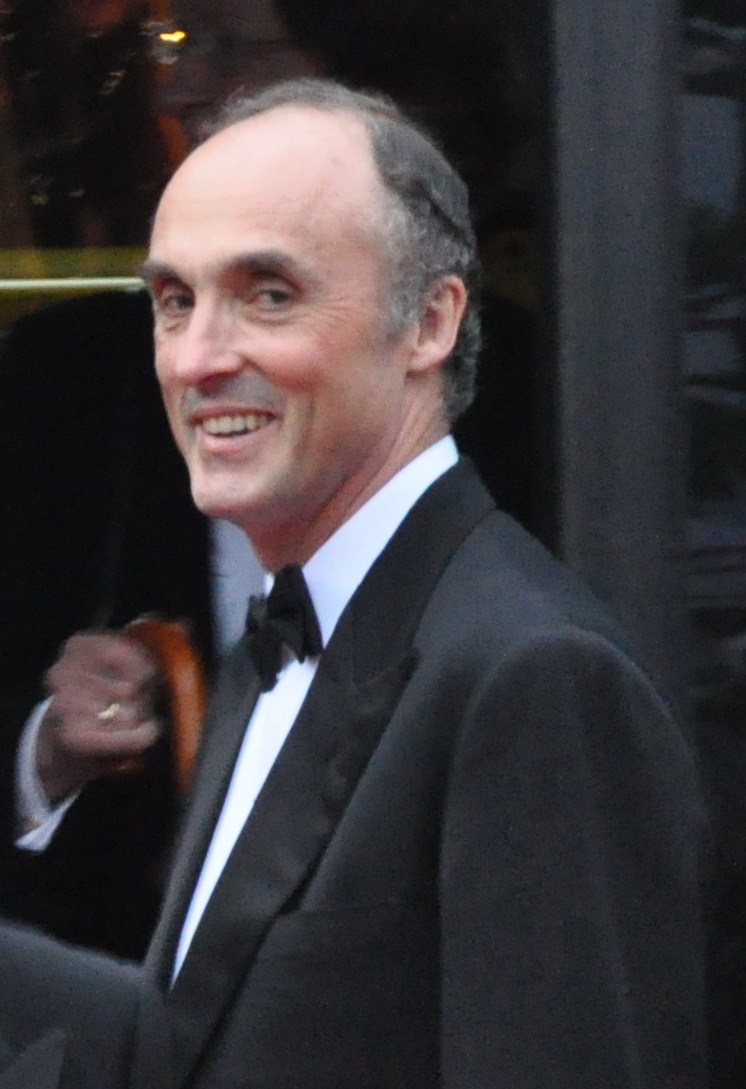
- Prince Lorenz at the wedding of Victoria, Crown Princess of Sweden in 2010
- Born: 16 December 1955 (age 70); Clinique du Belvédère, Boulogne-Billancourt, Hauts-de-Seine, France
- Spouse: Princess Astrid of Belgium (m. 1984)
- Issue: Prince Amedeo; Princess Maria Laura; Prince Joachim; Princess Luisa Maria; Princess Laetitia Maria
Names
- Lorenz Otto Carl Amadeus Thadeus Maria Pius Andreas Marcus d'Aviano Habsburg-Lothringen
- House: Austria-Este
- Father: Robert, Archduke of Austria-Este
- Mother: Princess Margherita of Savoy-Aosta

Prince Lorenz of Belgium, Archduke of Austria-Este (born 16 December 1955) is a member of the Belgian royal family as the husband of Princess Astrid of Belgium. He is the head of the House of Austria-Este, a cadet branch of the House of Habsburg-Lorraine; he has held this position since 1996. He is a grandson of Emperor Charles I of Austria, the last Emperor of Austria and King of Hungary.

== Personal life ==
Prince Lorenz was born at Clinique du Belvédère in Boulogne-Billancourt, Hauts-de-Seine, France, as the second child and eldest son of Robert, Archduke of Austria-Este, and his wife, Archduchess Margaret (née Princess Margherita of Savoy-Aosta). He is the grandson of Charles I of Austria, the last Emperor of Austria.

He and his uncle, Carl Ludwig, complained about the constitutional provision that prohibited members of the former ruling dynasty from running in the Austrian presidential elections, and the terms under which their family was banished from the country. Their subsequent appeal to the European Commission for Human Rights was ruled inadmissible by the court. Further, in June 2011, the Habsburg Law was repealed by the Austrian Parliament.

=== Marriage and issue ===
On 22 September 1984, at the Church of Our Lady of Victories at the Sablon in Brussels, Prince Lorenz married Princess Astrid of Belgium, the only daughter of the then-Prince and Princess of Liège, later King Albert II and Queen Paola. The couple has five children:

- Prince Amedeo Maria Josef Carl Pierre Philippe Paola Marcus d'Aviano of Belgium, Archduke of Austria-Este (born on 21 February 1986 at Cliniques universitaires Saint-Luc in Woluwé-Saint-Lambert, Brussels). Married Elisabetta "Lili" Maria Rosboch von Wolkenstein, on 5 July 2014 in Rome's Basilica of Santa Maria in Trastevere. They have three children: (Note: Due to a royal decree issued by his uncle King Philippe, which limits the range of family members bearing the title "Prince of Belgium", Amedeo's children do not bear the princely title nor the style of Royal Highness.)
  - Archduchess Anna Astrid Marie of Austria-Este (born on 17 May 2016)
  - Archduke Maximilian Joseph Lorenz Ettore Karl Marcus d'Aviano of Austria-Este (born on 6 September 2019)
  - Archduchess Alix Lorenza Anne Marie Josephine of Austria-Este (born on 2 September 2023)
- Princess Maria Laura Zita Beatrix Gerhard of Belgium, Archduchess of Austria-Este (born on 26 August 1988 at Cliniques universitaires Saint-Luc in Woluwé-Saint-Lambert, Brussels). Married William Isvy on 10 September 2022, at the Cathedral of St. Michael and St. Gudula in Brussels. They have one son:
  - Albert Isvy (born on 26 January 2025)
- Prince Joachim Karl-Maria Nikolaus Isabelle Marcus d'Aviano of Belgium, Archduke of Austria-Este (born on 9 December 1991 at Cliniques universitaires Saint-Luc in Woluwé-Saint-Lambert, Brussels)
- Princess Luisa Maria Anna Martine Pilar of Belgium, Archduchess of Austria-Este (born 11 October 1995 at Clinique St Jean in Woluwé-Saint-Lambert, Brussels)
- Princess Laetitia Maria Nora Anna Joachim Zita of Belgium, Archduchess of Austria-Este (born on 23 April 2003 at Clinique St Jean in Woluwé-Saint-Lambert, Brussels).

Prince Lorenz is the godfather to Prince Carl-Johan of Nassau, youngest child of Prince Jean of Luxembourg, and Count Costantino Secco di Aragona, the oldest son of his cousin, Archduchess Catharina-Maria of Austria.

== Title ==
The title Prince of Belgium was granted to him by royal decree on 10 November 1995 by his father-in-law, King Albert II of Belgium. The Belgian monarchy refers to him as the Archduke of Austria-Este.

== Honours ==
=== National ===
- Belgium: Grand Cross of the Order of Leopold

=== Dynastic ===
- (Duchy of Modena) House of Habsburg-Este: Sovereign Knight Grand Cross of the Order of the Eagle of Este
- (Austria-Hungary) House of Habsburg-Lorraine: 1,285th Knight of the Order of the Golden Fleece
- (Kingdom of Montenegro) Montenegrin Royal Family: Knight Grand Cross of the Order of Prince Danilo I
- (Kingdom of Romania) Romanian Royal Family: Knight Grand Cross of the Royal Order of the Crown

=== Foreign ===
Arms as a Knight Grand Cross of the Order of Civil Merit

- Germany: Grand Cross 1st Class of the Order of Merit of the Federal Republic of Germany
- Luxembourg: Grand Cross of the Order of Adolphe of Nassau
- Netherlands: Grand Cross of the Order of the Crown
- Norway: Grand Cross of the Order of Merit
- Palestine:
  - (Vatican City) Latin Catholic Patriarchate of Jerusalem: Knight Grand Cross of the Order of the Holy Sepulchre
- Portugal: Grand Cross of the Order of Prince Henry
- Spain: Knight Grand Cross of the Order of Civil Merit
- Sweden: Grand Cross of the Royal Order of the Polar Star

== Military ranks ==
- Austria 1980– : Austrian Armed Forces, Leutnant as Reserve Officer

== Notes ==
Prince Lorenz of Belgium House of Austria-Este Born: 16 December 1955
Titles in pretence
Preceded by Archduke Robert	Archduke of Austria-Este; 1996–present	Incumbent; Heir: Amedeo
