= Robert, Archduke of Austria-Este =

Robert
- Archduke of Austria, Royal Prince of Hungary and Bohemia
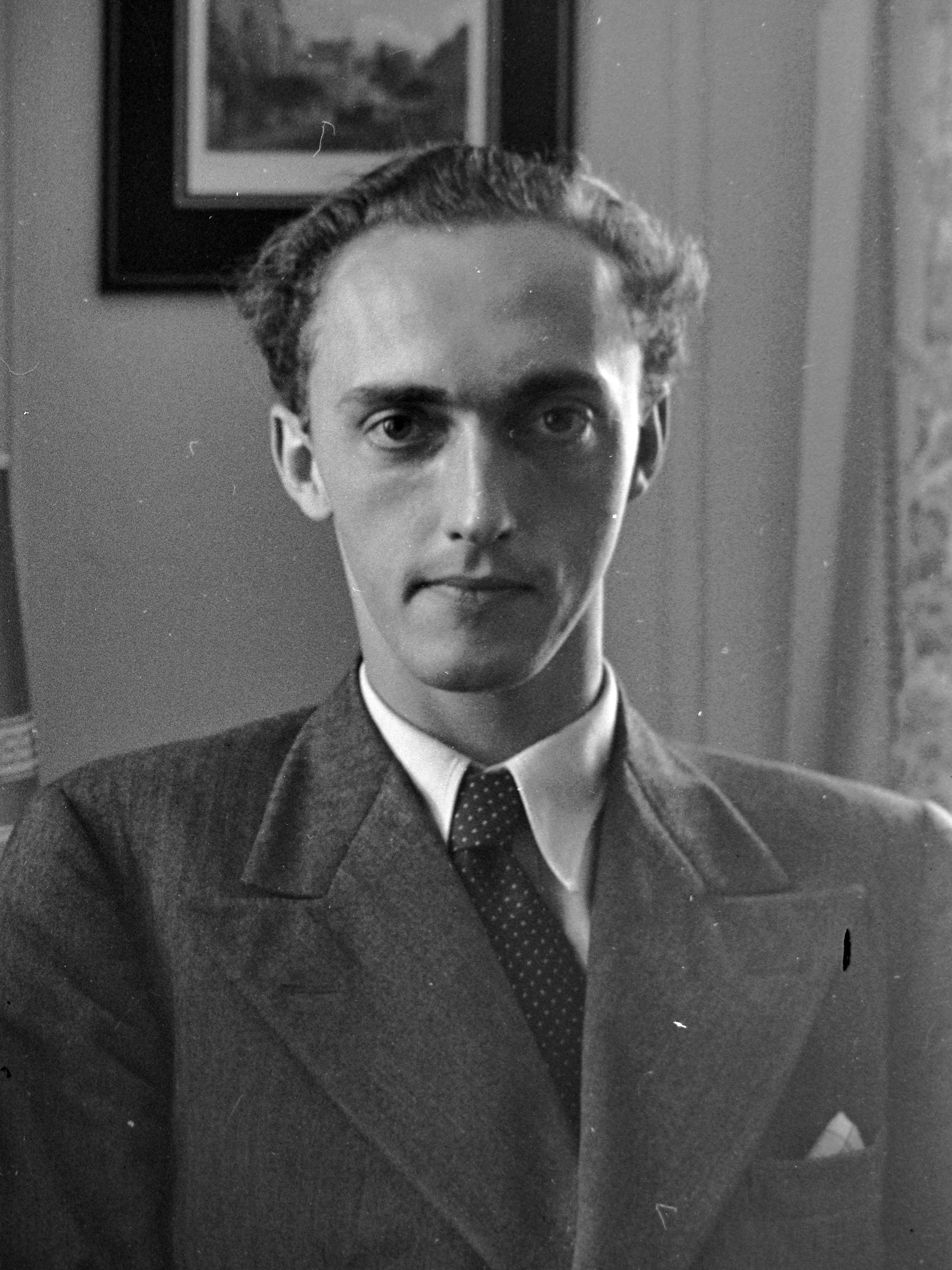
- Archduke Robert in 1940

Archduke of Austria-Este
- Tenure: 16 April 1917 – 7 February 1996
- Successor: Archduke Lorenz
- Born: 8 February 1915; Schönbrunn Palace, Vienna, Austria-Hungary
- Died: 7 February 1996 (aged 80); Basel, Basel-Stadt, Switzerland
- Spouse: Princess Margherita of Savoy-Aosta (m. 1953)
- Issue: Archduchess Maria Beatrice; Prince Lorenz, Archduke of Austria-Este; Archduke Gerhard; Archduke Martin; Archduchess Isabella
Names
- Robert Karl Ludwig Maximilian Michael Maria Anton Franz Ferdinand Joseph Otto Hubert Georg Pius Johannes Marcus d'Aviano Habsburg-Lothringen
- House: House of Habsburg and House of Austria-Este
- Father: Charles I of Austria
- Mother: Princess Zita of Parma

Robert, Archduke of Austria-Este (given names: Robert Karl Ludwig Maximilian Michael Maria Anton Franz Ferdinand Joseph Otto Hubert Georg Pius Johannes Marcus d'Aviano; 8 February 1915 – 7 February 1996), was the second son of Charles I, (beatified) last Emperor of Austria-Hungary, and Princess Zita of Bourbon-Parma. He was also known as Robert Karl Erzherzog von Österreich.

== Archduke of Austria-Este ==
On 16 April 1917, when he was two years old, his father, the Emperor, ceded the title of Archduke of Austria-Este in Robert's favour. Archduke Robert was thereby chosen to preserve, in the form of a distinct secundogeniture, the Habsburg-Lorraine representation of the once-sovereign Duchy of Modena which had belonged to the House of Este. He was thus made heir to his assassinated relative Archduke Franz Ferdinand of Austria (1863–1914), who had inherited in 1875 the Austria-Este designation and what had been salvaged of the Este fortune when the duchy was annexed to Italy in 1860.

== Family ==
Archduke Robert married Princess Margherita of Savoy-Aosta (7 April 1930 – 10 January 2022, elder daughter of the late Amadeo, 3rd Duke of Aosta) on 28 December 1953 in Bourg-en-Bresse, Ain, France (civilly) and 29 December 1953, in Brou, Eure-et-Loir, France (religiously).
The couple had five children:

- Archduchess Maria Beatrice (born 11 December 1954) married on 26 April 1980 in Chartres Count Riprand of Arco-Zinneberg, a great-grandson of the last Bavarian king, Ludwig III and Maria Theresia, Archduchess of Austria-Este. They have six daughters:
  - Countess Anna Theresa von und zu Arco-Zinneberg (born 1981) married on 29 September 2018, at Niederaltaich Abbey in Bavaria, Colin McKenzie (born 1976). They have two children.
    - Josephine McKenzie (born 2019)
    - Caspar McKenzie (born 2022)
  - Countess Margherita von und zu Arco-Zinneberg (born 1983) married on 19 March 2022, in Moos, Bavaria, Charles Douglas Green (born 1981)
  - Countess Olympia von und zu Arco-Zinneberg (born 4 January 1988) married on 17 October 2019, in Neuilly-sur-Seine, France, Jean-Christophe, Prince Napoléon (born 1986). They have one son.
    - Louis Charles Napoléon (7 December 2022)
  - Countess Maximiliana von und zu Arco-Zinneberg (born 1990) married on 17 May 2023, in Moos, Bavaria, Byron Houdayer (born 1986)
  - Countess Marie Gabrielle von und zu Arco-Zinneberg (born 1992), who is a mezzo-soprano opera singer
  - Countess Giorgiana von und zu Arco-Zinneberg (born 1997)
- Prince Lorenz of Belgium, Archduke of Austria-Este (born 16 December 1955) married on 22 September 1984 at Brussels, Princess Astrid of Belgium (born 1962), daughter of Albert II, King of the Belgians. They have five children:
  - Prince Amedeo of Belgium, Hereditary Archduke of Austria-Este (born 1986) married Elisabetta Rosboch von Wolkenstein on 5 July 2014 in Rome, Italy. They have three children.
    - Archduchess Anna Astrid (17 May 2016)
    - Archduke Maximilian (6 September 2019)
    - Archduchess Alix (2 September 2023)
  - Princess Maria Laura of Belgium, Archduchess of Austria-Este (born 1988) married William Isvy (born 1991) on 10 September 2022 in Brussels, Belgium. They have one son:
    - Albert Isvy (26 January 2025)
  - Prince Joachim of Belgium, Archduke of Austria-Este (born 1991)
  - Princess Luisa Maria of Belgium, Archduchess of Austria-Este (born 1995)
  - Princess Laetitia Maria of Belgium, Archduchess of Austria-Este (born 2003)
- Archduke Gerhard (born 30 October 1957) married in 2015 Iris Jandrasits (born 1961).
- Archduke Martin (born 21 December 1959) married in 2004 Princess Katharina of Isenburg, sister of Sophie, Princess of Prussia and Isabelle, Princess of Wied. They have four children:
  - Archduke Bartholomaeus of Austria (2006)
  - Archduke Emmanuel of Austria (2008)
  - Archduchess Helene of Austria (2009)
  - Archduke Luigi of Austria (2011)
- Archduchess Isabella (born 2 March 1963) married in 1997 Count Andrea Czarnocki-Lucheschi. They have four children:
  - Alvise Czarnocki-Lucheschi (1999)
  - Carlo Amedeo Czarnocki-Lucheschi (2000)
  - Maria Anna Czarnocki-Lucheschi (2002)
  - Alessandro Czarnocki-Lucheschi (2004)

== Ancestry ==
Ancestors of Robert, Archduke of Austria-Este

8. Archduke Karl Ludwig of Austria
4. Archduke Otto Franz of Austria
9. Princess Maria Annunziata of Bourbon-Two Sicilies
2. Charles I of Austria
10. George of Saxony
5. Princess Maria Josepha of Saxony
11. Infanta Maria Ana of Portugal
1. Robert, Archduke of Austria-Este
12. Charles III, Duke of Parma
6. Robert I, Duke of Parma
13. Princess Louise of Artois
3. Princess Zita of Bourbon-Parma
14. Miguel I of Portugal
7. Infanta Maria Antónia of Portugal
15. Princess Adelaide of Löwenstein

Robert, Archduke of Austria-Este House of Austria-Este Cadet branch of the House of Habsburg and House of Este Born: 8 February 1915 Died: 7 February 1996
Titles in pretence
Preceded by Karl	Archduke of Austria-Este; 1917–1996	Succeeded by Lorenz
