= Prince Emanuele Filiberto, Duke of Aosta =

Prince of Asturias, 2nd Duke of Aosta (1869 –1931)

Prince Emanuele Filiberto
- Prince of Asturias
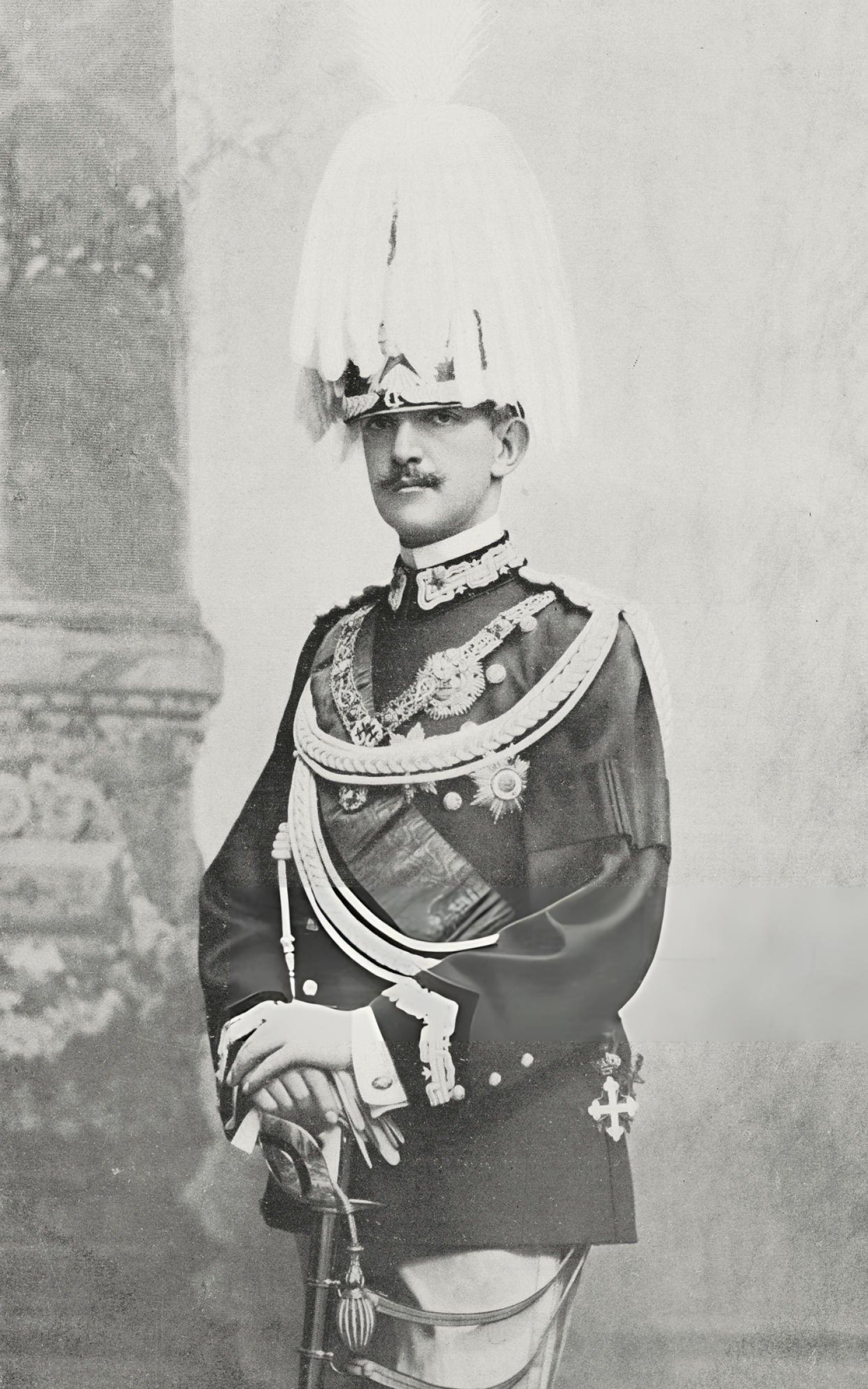
- Emanuele Filiberto in 1903

Duke of Aosta
- Reign: 18 January 1890 – 4 July 1931
- Predecessor: Amedeo I
- Successor: Amedeo II
- Born: 13 January 1869; Genoa, Kingdom of Italy
- Died: 4 July 1931 (aged 62); Turin, Kingdom of Italy
- Burial: Redipuglia War Memorial
- Spouse: Princess Hélène of Orléans (m. 1895)
- Issue: Prince Amedeo, Duke of Aosta; Prince Aimone, Duke of Aosta
Names
- Emanuele Filiberto Vittorio Eugenio Alberto Genova Giuseppe Maria
- House: Savoy
- Father: Amadeo I of Spain
- Mother: Maria Vittoria dal Pozzo, 6th Princess of la Cisterna
- Military career
- Allegiance: Kingdom of Italy
- Branch: Royal Italian Army
- Rank: Marshal of Italy
- Nickname: "Il Duca Invitto" (The Undefeated Duke)
- Commands: Italian Third Army
- Conflicts: World War I

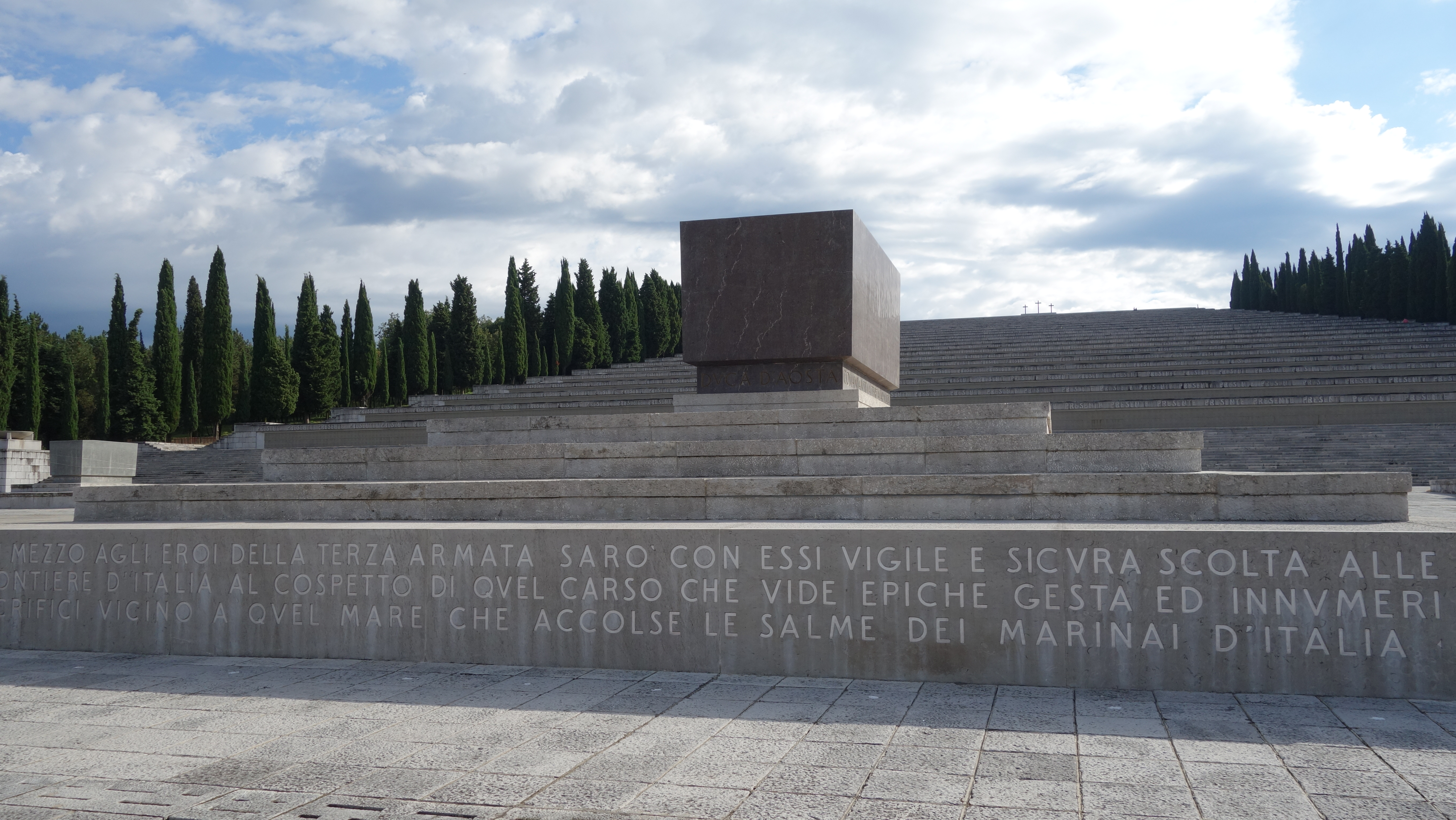
The Redipuglia War Memorial in Italy. In the foreground is the tomb of Prince Emanuele Filiberto, Duke of Aosta, known as the "Undefeated Duke" for his record in the First World War.

Prince Emanuele Filiberto Vittorio Eugenio Alberto Genova Giuseppe Maria di Savoia, 2nd Duke of Aosta (Spanish: Manuel Filiberto; 13 January 1869 – 4 July 1931) was an Italian general and member of the House of Savoy, as the son of Amadeo I, and was also a cousin of Victor Emmanuel III of Italy. Filiberto was also commander of the Italian Third Army during World War I, which earned him the title of the "Undefeated Duke". After the war he became a Marshal of Italy.

== Biography ==
He was born in Genoa, the eldest son of Prince Amadeo of Savoy, Duke of Aosta (second son of King Vittorio Emanuele II) and his first wife Donna Maria Vittoria dal Pozzo della Cisterna. In 1870, Amadeo was elected King of Spain, but abdicated and returned to Italy in 1873. Amadeo died in 1890, and Emanuele Filiberto succeeded as Duke of Aosta.

He began his career in the Italian Army at Naples, in 1905, as commander. During World War I, he commanded the Italian Third Army, which gained the nickname of Armata invitta ("undefeated army"). Following the war he was promoted to the rank of Marshal of Italy by Benito Mussolini in 1926.

Prince Emanuele Filiberto died in 1931 at Turin. In accordance and observance of his will, he was buried in the military cemetery of Redipuglia, together with thousands of soldiers of the Third Army.

Named after him were:

- the Duke of Aosta Bridge in Rome, completed in 1942
- a bridge on the Piave at Jesolo, inaugurated in 1927
- a street in Rome
- the cruiser Emanuele Filiberto Duca d'Aosta, which was given to the Soviet Union after World War II

== Family and children ==
He was married on 25 June 1895 to Princess Hélène of Orléans (1871–1951). She was a daughter of Prince Philippe of Orléans and the Infanta Maria Isabel of Spain.

They had two sons:

- Amedeo, 3rd Duke of Aosta (21 October 1898 – 3 March 1942); married Princess Anne of Orléans with issue.
- Aimone, 4th Duke of Aosta (9 March 1900 – 29 January 1948), who briefly reigned as King Tomislav II of Croatia; married Princess Irene of Greece and Denmark with issue.

== Honours and awards ==
- Kingdom of Italy:
  - Knight of the Annunciation, 14 March 1890
  - Grand Cross of Saints Maurice and Lazarus, 14 March 1890
  - Grand Cross of the Crown of Italy, 14 March 1890
  - Grand Cross of the Military Order of Savoy, 28 December 1916
  - Gold Medal of Military Valour, 24 June 1937
- Austria-Hungary:
  - Grand Cross of the Royal Hungarian Order of St. Stephen, 1895
  - Knight of the Golden Fleece, 1899
- Kingdom of Prussia: Knight of the Black Eagle, 17 May 1893
- Siam: Knight of the Order of the Royal House of Chakri, 1 June 1897
- Sweden-Norway: Knight of the Seraphim, 18 September 1897
- United Kingdom: Stranger Knight Companion of the Garter, 15 July 1902
- Kingdom of Saxony: Knight of the Rue Crown
- Spain: Grand Cross of the Order of Charles III, with Collar, 28 December 1923

== Ancestry ==
Ancestors of Prince Emanuele Filiberto, Duke of Aosta

8. Charles Albert of Sardinia
4. Victor Emmanuel II of Italy
9. Archduchess Maria Theresa of Austria
2. Amadeo I of Spain
10. Archduke Rainer of Austria
5. Archduchess Adelaide of Austria
11. Princess Elisabeth of Savoy
1. Prince Emanuele Filiberto, Duke of Aosta
12. Giuseppe Alfonso dal Pozzo della Cisterna, 4º Principe di Cisterna d'Asti e di Belriguardo
6. Carlo Emmanuele dal Pozzo della Cisterna, 5º Principe di Cisterna d'Asti e di Belriguardo
13. Maria Anna Balbo Bertone dei Conti di Sambuy
3. Maria Vittoria dal Pozzo della Cisterna, 6ª Principessa di Cisterna d'Asti e di Belriguardo
14. Count Werner de Mérode-Westerloo
7. Countess Louise de Mérode-Westerloo
15. Countess Victoire van Spangen d'Uyternesse

Prince Emanuele Filiberto, Duke of Aosta House of Savoy Born: 13 January 1869 Died: 4 July 1931
Spanish royalty
Vacant Glorious Revolution Title last held by Alfonso (XII)	Prince of Asturias; 1871–1873	Vacant First Spanish Republic Title next held by Isabella
Italian nobility
New creation	Duke of Apulia; 1869–1890	Succeeded by Amedeo
Preceded by Amedeo	Duke of Aosta; 1890–1931	Succeeded by Amedeo
Preceded by Maria Vittoria dal Pozzo	Prince della Cisterna; 1876–1931	Succeeded by Amedeo
