= Silvia Paternò di Spedalotto =

Italian noble (born 1953)

Princess Silvia
- Dowager Duchess of Aosta
- Born: Silvia Ottavia Costanza Maria Paternò di Spedalotto; 31 December 1953 (age 72); Palermo, Italy
- Spouse: Prince Amedeo, Duke of Aosta (m. 1987; died 2021)
- Father: Vincenzo Paternò di Spedalotto, 6th Marchese di Regiovanni
- Mother: Rosanna Bellardo e Ferraris

Princess Silvia, Dowager Duchess of Aosta (born Silvia Ottavia Costanza Maria Paternò di Spedalotto on 31 December 1953), is an Italian noblewoman who is the widow of Prince Amedeo, Duke of Aosta.

== Biography ==
Silvia was born on 31 December 1953 to Vincenzo Paternò di Spedalotto, 6th Marchese di Regiovanni, and his wife Rosanna Bellardo e Ferraris, becoming a daughter of a noble family of Palermo.

In 1987, Silvia received a diploma from studying in Arezzo. The diploma allowed her to serve as an Italian Red Cross (CRI) volunteer nurse. She would serve on various humanitarian missions in Kenya, Iraq, and Romania, the last of which earned her a Bronze medal of merit from the CRI. She also serves as the honorary president of the ethical movement for the international defense of the crucifix (MEDIC).

Silvia would marry Prince Amedeo in 1987 at Villa Spedalotto, becoming his second wife. They were married for 34 years, until his death on 1 June 2021.

== See also ==
- Duchess of Aosta
