= Villa Spedalotto =

Villa in Bagheria, Sicily

Coordinates: 38.0737°N 13.5178°E

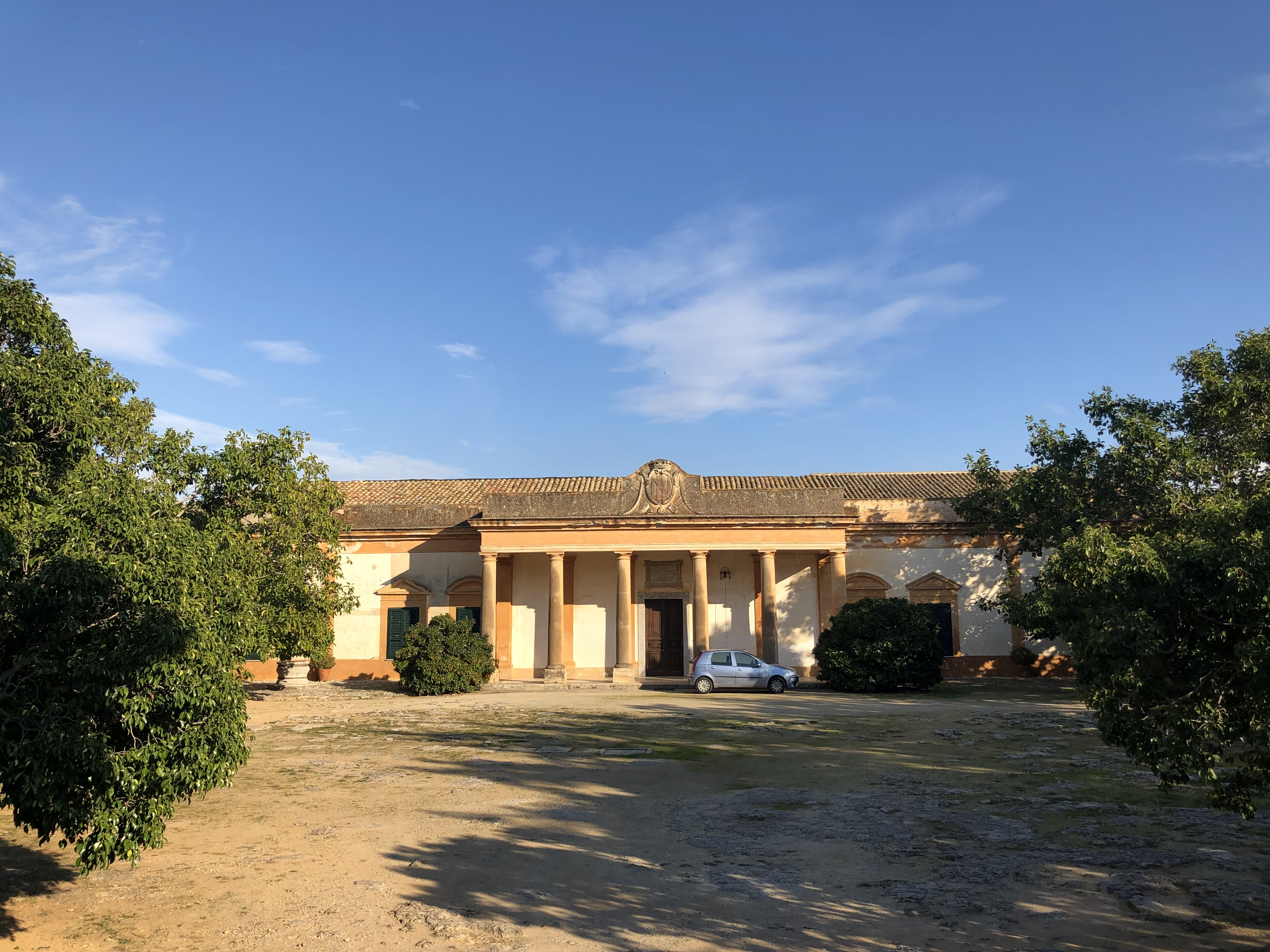
Villa Spedalotto

The Villa Spedalotto is the country home of the Paternò di Spedalotto family. The villa is situated on a hill surrounded by olive groves at Bagheria, near Palermo in Sicily. As all the Villas in Bagheria, it was built as a country house, and was traditionally used by the family only during the spring and autumn. While considered a national monument, it remains a private residence.

== History ==
The house was first conceived by Don Barbaro Arezzo who employed in 1783 the architect Giovanni Emanuele Incardona to design his country house, the result - Villa Spedalotto was built between 1784 and 1793. The architect had been a student of Giuseppe Venanzio Marvuglia, one of Sicily's promoters of Neoclassicism. In 1790, while still under construction, the house was purchased by Don Onofrio Emanuele Paternò di Raddusa, Baron of Spedalotto and Gallitano.

In 1799, the villa was used to accommodate the exiled royal family of Naples Francis of Bourbon (the future King Francis I), his wife Archduchess Maria Clementina of Austria, and the daughter Maria Carolina (future Duchess of Berry). The royal family had escaped from Naples following the revolution of 1799.

A tradition is that King Ferdinand II of The Two Sicilies was born in the villa on 1810, but his official historiography states he was born in the royal palace at Palermo.

During the 1870s Jesuit astronomer Father Angelo Secchi S.J. was often a guest at the villa. He was a close friend to the Marquess, and used the terrace for his observations of the heavens.

== Architecture ==
The house, which is low, is built around an open courtyard of two wings flanking the corps de logis, at the centre of which is a large Greek revival portico giving access to the villa. The windows are ornamented by alternating pointed and segmented pediments.

Architecturally, the house is notable for its neoclassical facades. Built in the late 18th century, when Sicilian Baroque was falling from favour, the house shows influences of the neo-Grecian style which in Sicily immediately followed the Baroque. The interior of the villa has rooms decorated in early-Empire style, sometimes known as Pompeian, with Baroque influences, which involved copious quantities of trompe-l'œil. At the Villa Spedalotto, the frescoes by Elia Interguglielmi are clearly inspired by some drawings of Simon Vouet, now part of the collections of Versailles.

A distinguishing feature of the villa is the use of blue and white Vietri tiles, which cover the broad terrace looking towards the sea. They were placed in 1845, while between 1900 and the 1902 were replaced the tiles inside. The portico was partially damaged on the left side, from the British allied bombing in July 1943, and was reconstructed in 1945.

The villa has a chapel where in 1987, a daughter of the family, Silvia Paternò di Spedalotto, married H.R.H. The Duke of Aosta, a claimant to the Italian throne.

== Filmography ==
In 1991 the villa was the location for some scenes of the film Johnny Stecchino by Roberto Benigni.
