= Princess Hélène of Orléans =

Duchess of Aosta (1871–1951)

Princess Hélène
- Duchess of Aosta
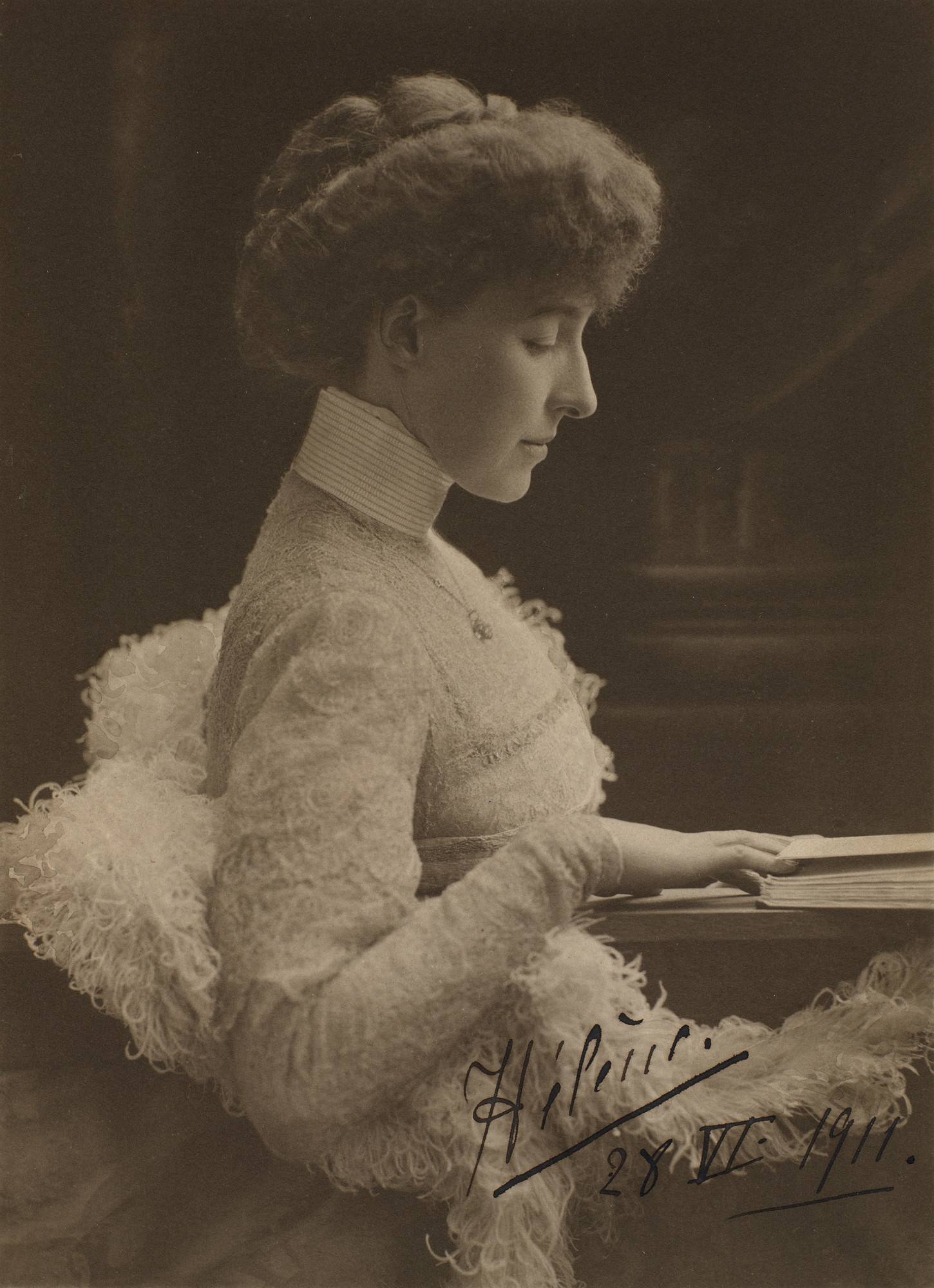
- Photograph by Henry Walter Barnett, 1911
- Born: 13 June 1871; York House, Twickenham, England
- Died: 21 January 1951 (aged 79); Castellammare di Stabia, Italy
- Burial: Basilica dell'Incoronata Madre del Buon Consiglio, Naples
- Spouse: Prince Emanuele Filiberto, Duke of Aosta (m. 1895; died 1931) Colonel Otto Campini (m. 1936)
- Issue: Prince Amedeo, Duke of Aosta; Prince Aimone, Duke of Aosta
Names
- French: Hélène Louise Henriette d'Orléans
- House: Orléans
- Father: Prince Philippe, Count of Paris
- Mother: Infanta Maria Isabel of Spain
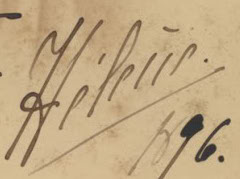
- Signature

Princess Hélène of Orléans (French: Princesse Hélène Louise Henriette d'Orléans; 13 June 1871 – 21 January 1951) was a member of the deposed royal family of France and, by marriage to the head of a cadet branch of the Italian royal family, the Duchess of Aosta. Although her hand in marriage was sought at various times for the heirs to the thrones of the United Kingdom, the Austrian Empire and the Russian Empire, no such marriage or alliance materialized.

== Family ==
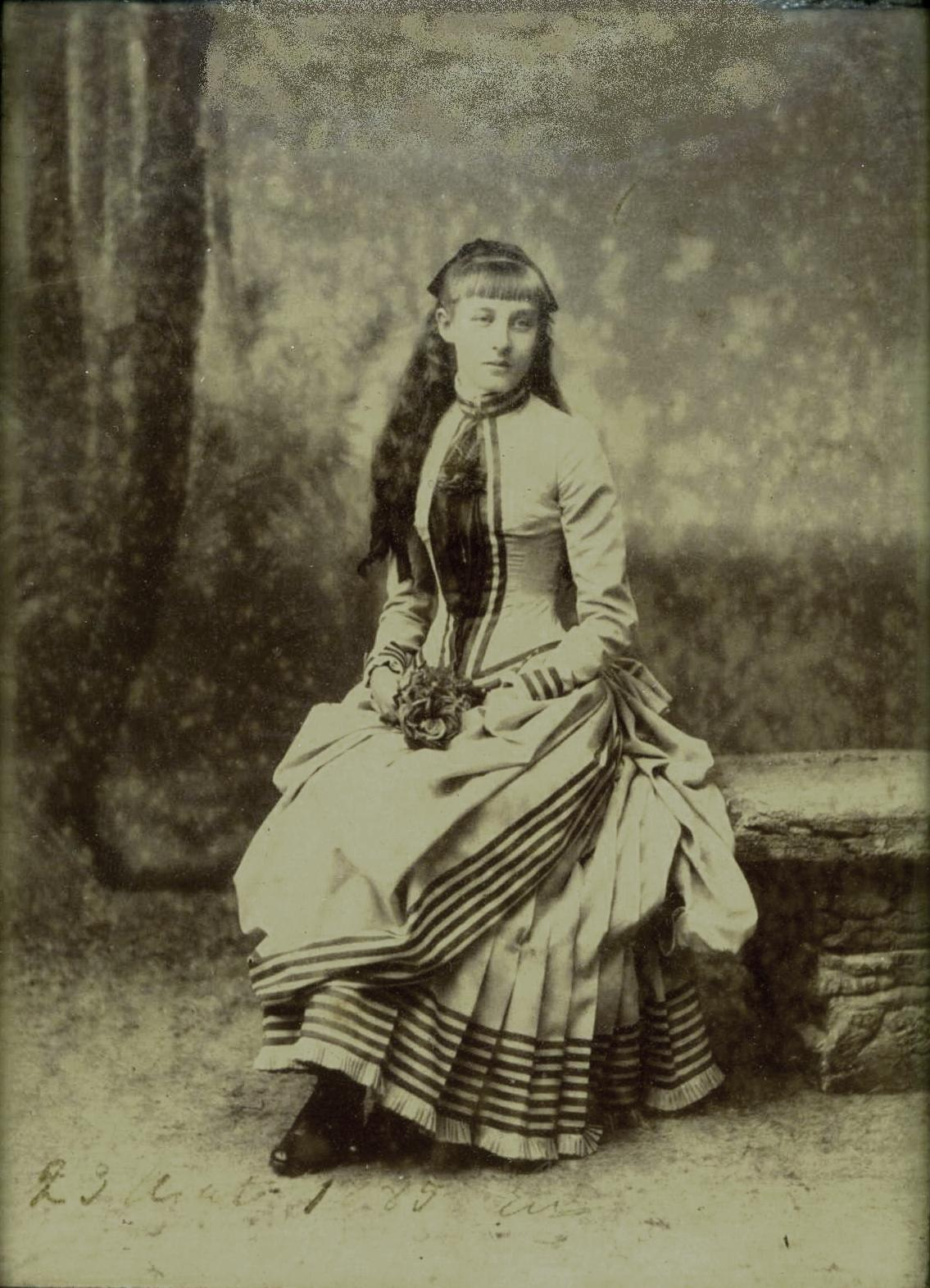
Hélène d'Orléans as a young girl (1885)

Hélène was the third of eight children born to Prince Philippe, Count of Paris, and Infanta Maria Isabel of Spain. Her father was a grandson of Louis Philippe I, King of the French, and had been heir-apparent to the throne from 1842 until the exile of the dynasty in 1848. Like her two elder siblings, she was born in exile at York House, Twickenham, shortly before the law of banishment against the dynasty was repealed. Repatriating to France at the end of June 1871, the family took up residence in Paris at the Hotel Fould on the Rue du Faubourg Saint-Honoré, as guests of their uncle, Henri, Duke of Aumale, whose wealth and properties in France had not been confiscated in 1852, unlike those of the other Orléans princes. On 21 December 1872 the National Assembly enacted a law of restitution, authorising restoration of approximately 40 million of the eighty million francs worth of property which had formerly belonged to the House of Orléans, although the actual re-acquisition of that wealth would take several years.

Meanwhile, a close friend of the Count and Countess of Paris, Maria Brignole Sale De Ferrari, placed at their disposal the ground floor and gardens of the Hôtel Matignon on the rue de Varenne in Paris. Along the adjacent rue de Babylone the Duchess had a two-story town house built to accommodate the Orléans children, their governesses and tutors, which served as Hélène's home from 1876 until her father was again exiled.

In 1883 the last legitimate prince in the male-line of Louis XV, Henri, Count of Chambord, died childless leaving, in the eyes of French royalists excepting recalcitrant legitimists, the Count of Paris as heir to the Bourbon crown of France. However, celebrations in Paris in the spring of 1886 prior to the marriage in Lisbon of Hélène's eldest sister Amélie to Carlos, Prince Royal of Portugal, evoked such clear expressions of monarchist support for the House of Orléans that on 22 July the French Republic took the precaution of banishing the heads of France's former ruling dynasties, the Orléans and Bonapartes, from the country. Nearly all of the Orléans promptly left France, with Hélène and her parents going on to visit Tunbridge Wells in England and then travelling to Scotland before taking up residence in October at Sheen House in East Sheen, England. In 1890 they moved on to Stowe House in Buckingham, England.

== Potential matches ==
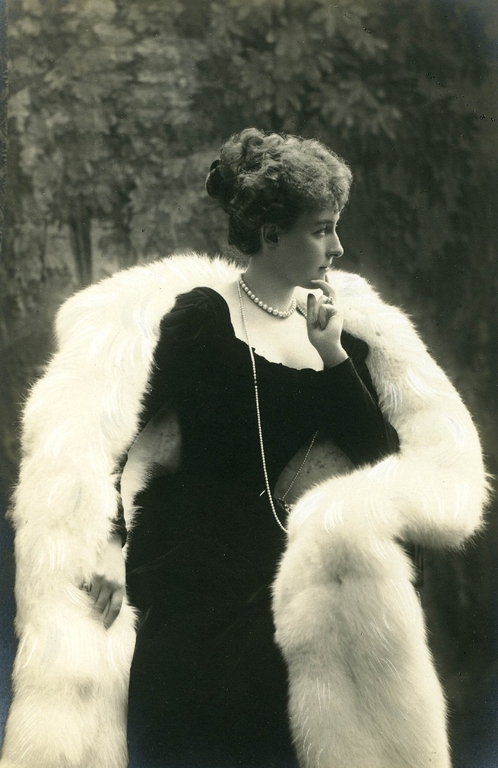
Hélène of Orléans - Duchess of Aosta, 1903

Most of Hélène's siblings had married well, including Amélie, Queen of Portugal, Philippe, Duke of Orléans (who married Archduchess Maria Dorothea of Austria) and Isabelle, Duchess of Guise, and Hélène's parents had hopes that she would marry an heir to a throne. Those hopes were fanned by the fact that Hélène was considered a great beauty for the day, and one contemporary source stated that she was "the personification of womanly health and beauty, distinguished as a graceful athlete and charming linguist".

=== Relationship with the Duke of Clarence ===
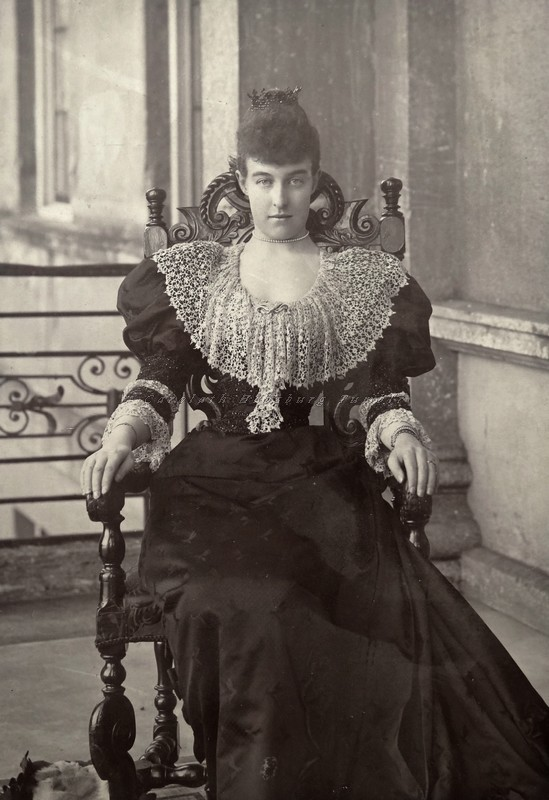
The Duchess of Aosta

Prince Albert Victor, Duke of Clarence and Avondale ("Eddy") was the eldest son of the future Edward VII and grandson of then reigning Queen Victoria. During the spring and summer of 1890, Eddy and Hélène were allowed to become acquainted at the homes of Clarence's sister Princess Louise, Duchess of Fife in Sheen and in Scotland, and, with the encouragement of their mothers, Hélène and Eddy fell in love. On 29 August, Clarence obtained permission to meet alone with his grandmother at Balmoral Castle in Scotland, and brought Hélène with him. Marriage to a Catholic would have entailed constitutional forfeiture of Eddy's claim to the British throne, pursuant to the Act of Settlement, but Hélène offered to become an Anglican. When Queen Victoria expressed surprise at Hélène's offer, Hélène wept and insisted that her willingness to do so was for the sake of love. Moved by the couple's desperate plea for her help, Victoria agreed to support them but warned that she thought there were many obstacles likely to render success unlikely. This included her expectation that Hélène's father would not consent to his daughter's change of faith.

Clarence offered to renounce his succession rights if necessary, writing to his brother: "You have no idea how I love this sweet girl now, and I feel I could never be happy without her". His mother agreed with the match, as did his father.

However Queen Victoria's fears of insurmountable opposition from multiple sources proved accurate. Her prime minister, Lord Salisbury expressed objections to the alliance to the Queen in writing at length on 9 September. Hélène's father refused to countenance the marriage, was adamant she could not convert and informed the Queen of his decision. He granted permission, nonetheless, for Hélène to personally beseech Pope Leo XIII for a dispensation to marry Clarence, but the Pope confirmed her father's verdict and the courtship ended.

Clarence never got over his feelings for Hélène and their relationship is commemorated at his tomb at Windsor Castle by a bead wreath with the single word "HELENE" written upon it. Queen Victoria wrote to her grandson recommending another of her grandchildren, Princess Margaret of Prussia, as an alternative, but nothing came of that suggestion, and Clarence told his grandmother that his love for another cousin, Alix of Hesse (a match for which the Queen had long hoped) had gone unrequited. An engagement to Princess Mary of Teck was later arranged, but Clarence died before their wedding could take place.

=== Other potential suitors ===
Although acknowledging his parents' desires for a French alliance in his diary, the future Nicholas II of Russia (a first cousin of Clarence) never pursued their choice, Hélène, as he was already in love with the aforementioned Alix of Hesse and secured their permission to marry her in 1894. In 1892, while travelling in Egypt with her brother Philippe, Hélène met Ernst Gunther, Duke of Schleswig-Holstein, who decided that he would marry her, to the fury of his sister, the German Empress Augusta Victoria. German diplomatic pressure put an end to Ernst Gunther's hopes, which were probably fruitless in any event as Hélène showed no interest in his advances. Later, family members pushed for a marriage with the Archduke Franz Ferdinand of Austria. Although the Emperor Franz Joseph did not favour the match he said that he would not oppose it, and Franz Ferdinand himself did not say no but deferred a decision. In the meantime, he met his future wife, Countess Sophie Chotek, and never considered Hélène again.

== Marriage and children ==
On 25 June 1895, at the Church of St. Raphael in Kingston upon Thames, Hélène married Prince Emanuele Filiberto of Savoy, 2nd Duke of Aosta (1869–1931). He was at the time second in line to the Italian throne. The wedding was attended by Crown Prince Victor Emmanuel of Italy, the Prince and Princess of Wales and others of the British royal family. The wedding breakfast was held at Orleans House.

The couple had two sons:

- Prince Amedeo, 3rd Duke of Aosta (21 October 1898 – 3 March 1942)
- Prince Aimone, 4th Duke of Aosta who briefly reigned as King Tomislav II of Croatia. (9 March 1900 – 29 January 1948)

Widowed in 1931, Princess Hélène was married for a second time in 1936 to Colonel Otto Campini.

== Avocations ==
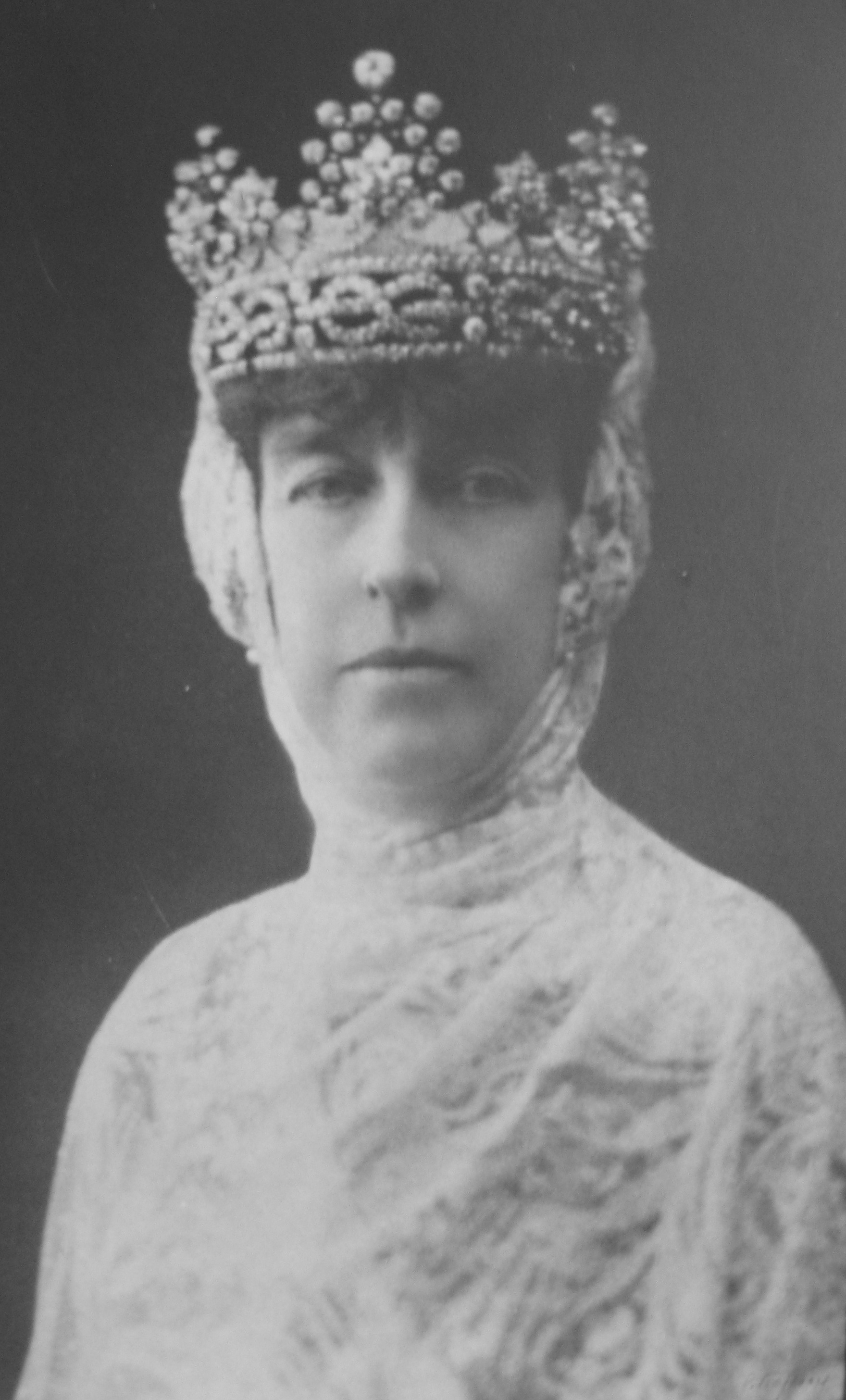
The Dowager Duchess of Aosta in her final years, 1946

In 1892 Hélène travelled with her brother Philippe to Egypt and Israel, the first of many trips outside of Europe. After the breakdown of both her health and her marriage, Hélène began frequent trips to Africa which lasted up to ten months at a time. She travelled down the Nile, into the Congo, and through much of East Africa, as well as crossing the Sahara. During these trips she became known as a big-game hunter, a reputation bolstered by articles she wrote for Harper's Weekly and later full-length travel books which were illustrated with photographs she had taken. In 1913–1914 Hélène undertook a round-the-world trip which she recorded in another travel book.

== War-time nurse ==
When the Italo-Turkish War broke out, Hélène trained as a nurse and went aboard the hospital ship Memfi, where she cared for wounded soldiers and those suffering from disease. During World War I, Hélène became the head of the Italian Red Cross nurses and spent much of her time on or near the front lines. She was remembered for greatly improving sanitary conditions in the military hospitals and elevating and professionalising the role of women nurses. For her service, Hélène was awarded the Italian Silver Medal for bravery, the Romanian Regina Maria Cross, the French Croix de Guerre, and the Insignia of a Dame Grand Cross of the Order of the British Empire. Her war-time diary was later published with an introduction by Benito Mussolini to aid the Italian Red Cross.

== Legacy ==
She was described in Infanta Eulalia's 1915 memoirs:

She is a somewhat masculine type of woman, and spends a great deal of her time in Abyssinia. She leaves her husband and two boys and, with no companion except an elderly Englishwoman, sets out on a hunting expedition. She is lost in the heart of Africa for months, and then suddenly reappears and settles down to the humdrum life of her palace. But soon she hears again the call of the wild, and is away once more. What she does in Abyssinia nobody knows, if one excepts the elderly Englishwoman. The country seems to have cast a spell on her, and she cannot resist its fascination.

== Ancestry ==
Ancestors of Princess Hélène of Orléans

8. Louis Philippe I of France
4. Prince Ferdinand Philippe, Duke of Orléans
9. Princess Marie Amélie of Naples and Sicily
2. Prince Philippe, Count of Paris
10. Frederick Louis, Hereditary Grand Duke of Mecklenburg-Schwerin
5. Duchess Helene of Mecklenburg-Schwerin
11. Princess Caroline Louise of Saxe-Weimar-Eisenach
1. Princess Hélène of Orléans
12. Louis Philippe I of France (= 8)
6. Prince Antoine, Duke of Montpensier
13. Princess Marie Amélie of Naples and Sicily (= 9)
3. Princess Marie Isabelle of Orléans
14. Ferdinand VII of Spain
7. Infanta Luisa Fernanda of Spain
15. Princess Maria Christina of the Two Sicilies

== Sources ==
- Pope-Hennessy, James (1959). Queen Mary 1867–1953. London: George Allen and Unwin Unlimited. ISBN 0-04-923025-5.
- Hanson, Edward (2017). The Wandering Princess: Princess Helene of France, Duchess of Aosta (1871–1951). Fonthill. ISBN 978-1-78155-592-7.

Princess Hélène of Orléans House of Orléans Cadet branch of the House of Bourbon Born: 13 June 1871 Died: 21 January 1951
Royal titles
Preceded by Maria Letizia Bonaparte	Duchess of Aosta; 25 June 1895 - 4 July 1931	Succeeded by Anne d'Orléans
