= Prince Aimone, Duke of Aosta =

Italian prince and nominal king of Croatia (1900–1948)

Prince Aimone Tomislav II
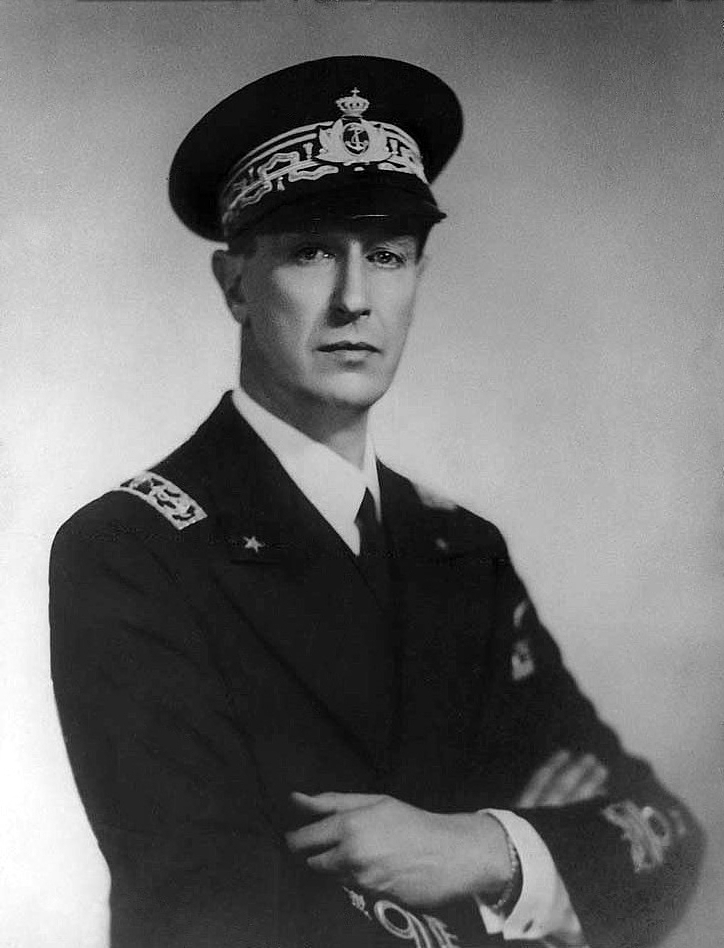
- Formal portrait, 1943

Duke of Aosta
- Reign: 3 March 1942 – 29 January 1948
- Predecessor: Amedeo
- Successor: Amedeo

King of Croatia
- Reign: 18 May 1941 – 31 July 1943
- Prime minister: Ante Pavelić
- Born: 9 March 1900; Turin, Kingdom of Italy
- Died: 29 January 1948 (aged 47); Buenos Aires, Argentina
- Burial: 31 January 1948; Basilica of Superga
- Spouse: Princess Irene of Greece and Denmark (m. 1939)
- Issue: Prince Amedeo, Duke of Aosta
Names
- Italian: Aimone Roberto Margherita Maria Giuseppe Torino di Savoia-Aosta
- House: Savoy
- Father: Prince Emanuele Filiberto, Duke of Aosta
- Mother: Hélène of Orléans

Prince Aimone, 4th Duke of Aosta (Aimone Roberto Margherita Maria Giuseppe Torino; 9 March 1900 – 29 January 1948), was a prince of Italy's reigning House of Savoy and an officer of the Royal Italian Navy. The second son of Prince Emanuele Filiberto, Duke of Aosta, he was granted the title Duke of Spoleto on 22 September 1904. He inherited the title Duke of Aosta on 3 March 1942 following the death of his brother Prince Amedeo in a British prisoner of war camp in Nairobi.

From 18 May 1941 to 31 July 1943, Aimone was designated king of the Independent State of Croatia (Croatian: Nezavisna Država Hrvatska, NDH), even though he never ruled there. He formally accepted the position and took the name Tomislav II, after the first Croatian king. Later, however, he refused to assume the kingship in protest of the Italian annexation of the Dalmatia region, and is therefore referred to in some sources as king designate. Regardless, many sources refer to him as King Tomislav II and the nominal head of the NDH during its first two years (1941–1943). After the dismissal of Mussolini on 25 July 1943, Aimone abdicated on 31 July as king on the orders of Victor Emmanuel III.

== Early life ==
Prince Aimone Roberto Margherita Maria Giuseppe Torino of Savoy-Aosta was born in Turin the second son of Prince Emanuele Filiberto, Duke of Aosta (eldest son of Prince Amedeo, 1st Duke of Aosta (and sometime "King Amadeo I of Spain") by his wife, née Vittoria dal Pozzo, Principessa della Cisterna) and Princess Hélène of Orléans (daughter of Philippe, comte de Paris, and Princess Marie Isabelle of Orléans). As his patrilinal great-grandfather was King Victor Emmanuel II of Italy, he was a member of the House of Savoy.

With his brother Amedeo, he was educated at St David's College, Reigate, Surrey, England, and Aimone later went to study at the naval academy in Livorno. On 1 April 1921, Prince Aimone became a member of the Italian Senate. Princes of the House of Savoy became members of the Senate at age 21, obtaining the right to vote at age 25.

In 1929, twenty years after his uncle Prince Luigi Amedeo, Duke of the Abruzzi had attempted to climb K2 in Karakoram, Prince Aimone led an expedition to Karakorum. A member of the expedition was Ardito Desio. Due to the failure to climb K2 twenty years earlier, Prince Aimone's expedition concentrated solely on scientific work. He was afterwards awarded the 1932 Royal Geographical Society's Patron's Medal for his work.

== Marriage and issue ==
After being romantically linked with Infanta Beatriz of Spain, the daughter of King Alfonso XIII, he married, on 1 July 1939 at the church of Santa Maria del Fiore, Florence, Princess Irene of Greece and Denmark, daughter of King Constantine I and Princess Sophie of Prussia. They had one son, Prince Amedeo, Duke of Aosta, born in 1943.

== War years ==
=== Croatian throne ===
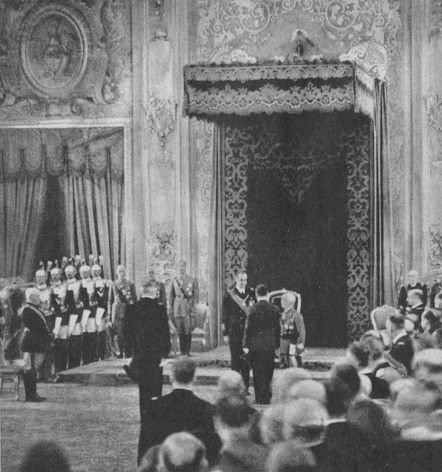
Designation of Aimone as king of Croatia on 18 May 1941. In front of him Poglavnik Pavelić with the Croatian delegation

On 18 May 1941, in a ceremony at the Quirinal Palace, to which Ante Pavelić, the leader of the fascistic Ustaše movement that had assumed power in Croatia in April 1941 after the invasion of Yugoslavia, led a delegation of Croats requesting that Italy's King Victor Emmanuel III name a member of the House of Savoy as king of Croatia. The Independent State of Croatia was a fascist puppet state that was partly under Italian and German control, covering most of present-day states of Croatia and Bosnia and Herzegovina, but its leaders tried to assert their legitimacy by instating a monarchy that would resemble the medieval Croatian state.

Aimone was then officially named king by his cousin Victor Emmanuel III. On assuming the Crown of Zvonimir he took the regnal name Tomislav II. Originally on learning that he had been named king of Croatia, he told close colleagues that he thought his nomination was a bad joke by his cousin King Victor Emmanuel III, though he accepted the crown out of a sense of duty. The Italian Foreign Minister and Benito Mussolini's son in law Count Ciano's informants said of Aimone "The Duke doesn't give a damn about Croatia and wants only money, money and more money." Ciano's diary noted a conversation between Aimone and himself, where Aimone was "proud of having been chosen King of Croatia, but has no exact idea of what he is supposed to do and is vaguely uneasy about it".

He was due to be crowned in Duvno (Tomislavgrad), in modern-day Bosnia and Herzegovina, but he refused to go to there due to the "Dalmatian question" which arose due to Italy taking some of Dalmatia's coastal territory. Aimone felt that Dalmatia "was a land that could never be Italianized" and was an obstacle to Italo-Croatian reconciliation. Other reasons why he never went to Croatia were because of an ongoing insurgency, and that his safety could not be guaranteed. Because of this he exercised what little power he had from Italy and Hungary, however he never held any real authority throughout his reign as the Ustaše government had deprived the monarchy of most powers and reduced the status of the king to that of a figurehead. Count Gyula Cseszneky was the counsellor to the king for Croatian affairs. Prince Aimone also established a Croatian office in Rome where he received confidential reports, official documents, and military, political and economic information from Croatia.

After the fall of the Fascist regime in Italy, Aimone abdicated as king of Croatia on 31 July 1943 on the orders of Victor Emmanuel III.

Prince Aimone succeeded to the title duke of Aosta on 3 March 1942, following the death of his elder brother Prince Amedeo, 3rd Duke of Aosta, in a British prisoner of war camp in Kenya.

In the autumn of 1942, Aimone contacted Allied forces via his courier, the consul general Alessandro Marieni, about the possibility of a peace settlement between Italy and Allied forces. Secret talks would continue into 1943, motivated in part by the aim of preserving the royal dynasty of Savoy.

=== Aftermath ===
In the latter months of World War II, he became the commander of the Italian Naval Base of Taranto but he was dismissed from his post for his criticism of the judges that had found General Mario Roatta guilty of war crimes. During his naval career he reached the rank of Squadron Admiral.

== Death ==
In 1947, following the birth of the Italian Republic the previous year, Prince Aimone left Italy for South America. Just a year after his arrival, he suddenly died on 29 January 1948 in his temporary residence, a private suite at the Alvear Palace Hotel in the French Borough of Recoleta in Buenos Aires, while his entourage was arranging his permanent residency documents and the purchase of his new home in Argentina. The claim to the Aosta ducal title passed to his son Prince Amedeo.

== Honours ==
=== National ===
- Independent State of Croatia: Sovereign Knight Commander of the Military Order of the Iron Trefoil, 1st Class
- Independent State of Croatia: Sovereign Knight Grand Cross of the Order of the Crown of King Zvonimir, Special Class
- Independent State of Croatia: Sovereign Recipient of the Medal of the Crown of King Zvonimir
- Italy: Knight Grand Collar of the Supreme Order of the Most Holy Annunciation
- Italy: Knight Grand Cordon of the Order of Saints Maurice and Lazarus
- Italy: Knight Grand Cordon of the Order of the Crown of Italy
- Italy: Knight Grand Cordon of the Military Order of Savoy
- Italy: Knight of the Civil Decoration of Savoy
- Italy: Recipient of the Silver Medal of Military Valor
- Italy: Recipient of the Bronze Medal of Military Valor
- Italy: Recipient of the Medal of Military Valor
- Italy: Recipient of the Medal of Honour for Long-time Maritime Navigation
  - Malta: Sovereign Military Order of Malta: Bailiff Knight Grand Cross of Justice of the Sovereign Military Order of Malta, 1st Class

=== Foreign ===
- Spain: Knight Grand Cross of the Order of Charles III
- Greece: Knight Grand Cross of the Order of the Redeemer
- Imperial Iran: Knight Grand Cordon of the Order of Pahlavi
- Romania: Knight Grand Cross with Collar of the Order of Carol I
- United Kingdom: Recipient of the Victory Medal

== Ancestry ==
Ancestors of Prince Aimone, Duke of Aosta

8. Victor Emmanuel II of Italy
4. Amadeo I of Spain
9. Archduchess Adelaide of Austria
2. Prince Emanuele Filiberto, Duke of Aosta
10. Carlo Emanuele dal Pozzo, Prince of Cisterna
5. Maria Vittoria dal Pozzo, Princess of Cisterna
11. Countess Louise de Mérode-Westerloo
1. Prince Aimone, Duke of Aosta
12. Prince Ferdinand Philippe, Duke of Orléans
6. Prince Philippe, Count of Paris
13. Duchess Helene of Mecklenburg-Schwerin
3. Princess Hélène of Orléans
14. Prince Antoine, Duke of Montpensier
7. Princess Marie Isabelle of Orléans
15. Infanta Luisa Fernanda of Spain

Prince Aimone, Duke of Aosta House of Savoy Born: 9 March 1900 Died: 29 January 1948
Italian nobility
Preceded by Amedeo	Duke of Aosta; 1942–1948	Succeeded by Amedeo
Regnal titles
Vacant Title last held by Charles IV as undisputed king	— DISPUTED — King of Croatia; 1941–1943	Vacant
