= Princess Anne of Orléans =

Duchess of Aosta (1906–1986)

Princess Anne
- Duchess of Aosta
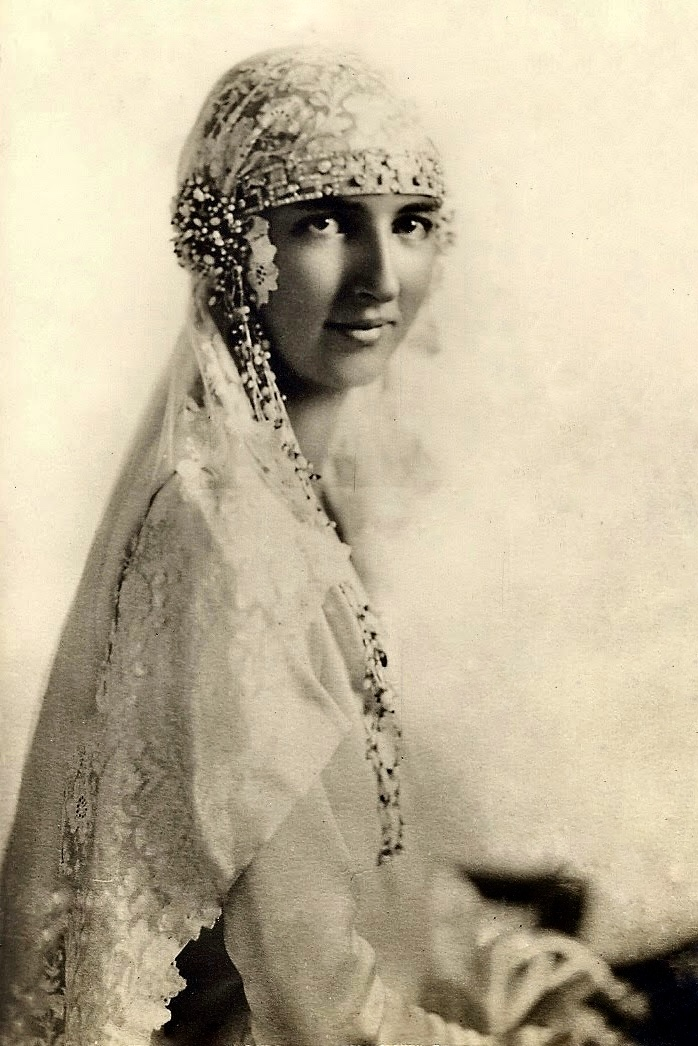
- Anne in 1927
- Born: 5 August 1906; Le Nouvion-en-Thiérache, France
- Died: 19 March 1986 (aged 79); Sorrento, Italy
- Burial: Basilica dell'Incoronata Madre del Buon Consiglio, Capodimonte
- Spouse: Prince Amedeo, Duke of Aosta (m. 1927; died 1942)
- Issue: Margherita, Archduchess of Austria-Este; Maria Cristina, Princess of Two Sicilies
Names
- Anne Hélène Marie d'Orléans
- House: Orléans
- Father: Prince Jean, Duke of Guise
- Mother: Princess Isabelle of Orléans

Princess Anne of Orléans (Anne Hélène Marie; 5 August 1906 – 19 March 1986) was a member of the House of Orléans and the Duchess of Aosta by marriage. She was the daughter of Prince Jean, Duke of Guise, and Princess Isabelle of Orléans.

== Marriage and issue ==
She married at Naples, Italy, on 5 November 1927, her first cousin Prince Amedeo of Savoy, Duke of Aosta (1898–1942). The couple had two daughters:

- Princess Margherita of Savoy-Aosta (7 April 1930 at Capodimonte Palace – 10 January 2022 at Basel); married on 28–29 December 1953 Archduke Robert, Archduke of Austria-Este (1915–1996), second son of the last Austrian emperor, Charles I. They have three sons and two daughters.
- Princess Maria Cristina of Savoy-Aosta (12 September 1933 at Miramare Castle – 18 November 2023 at São Paulo); married on 29 January 1967 Prince Casimir of Bourbon-Two Sicilies, son of Prince Gabriel of Bourbon-Two Sicilies and his second wife, Princess Cecylia Lubomirska. They have two sons and two daughters.

== Ancestry ==
Ancestors of Princess Anne of Orléans

8. Prince Ferdinand Philippe, Duke of Orléans
4. Prince Robert, Duke of Chartres
9. Duchess Helene of Mecklenburg-Schwerin
2. Prince Jean, Duke of Guise
10. François, Prince of Joinville
5. Princess Françoise of Orléans
11. Princess Francisca of Brazil
1. Princess Anne of Orléans
12. Prince Ferdinand Philippe, Duke of Orléans (= 8)
6. Prince Philippe, Count of Paris
13. Duchess Helene of Mecklenburg-Schwerin (= 9)
3. Princess Isabelle of Orléans
14. Prince Antoine, Duke of Montpensier
7. Princess Marie Isabelle of Orléans
15. Infanta Luisa Fernanda of Spain
