= Princess Irene, Duchess of Aosta =

Duchess of Aosta (1904–1974)

Irene of Greece and Denmark
- Duchess of Aosta
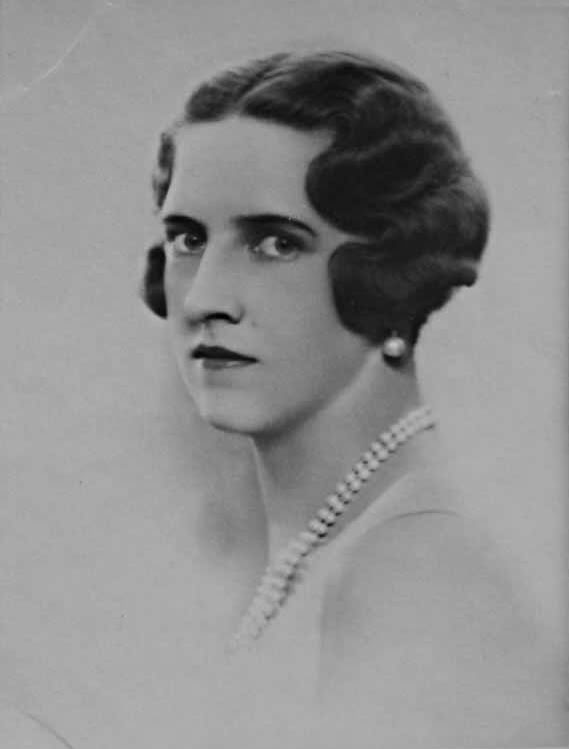
- Irene in 1925

Queen consort of Croatia
- Reign: 18 May 1941 – 31 July 1943
- Born: 13 February 1904; Athens, Greece
- Died: 15 April 1974 (aged 70); Fiesole, Italy
- Burial: 20 April 1974; Il Borro, then Basilica of Superga
- Spouse: Prince Aimone, Duke of Aosta (m. 1939; died 1948)
- Issue: Prince Amedeo, Duke of Aosta
- House: Glücksburg
- Father: Constantine I of Greece
- Mother: Sophia of Prussia

Princess Irene of Greece and Denmark, Duchess of Aosta (Greek: Πριγκίπισσα Ειρήνη της Ελλάδας και Δανίας; 13 February 1904 – 15 April 1974) was the fifth child and second daughter of King Constantine I of Greece and the former Princess Sophie of Prussia (sister of Kaiser Wilhelm II of Germany). She was a member of the Royal Families of Greece and Italy.

== Family and early life ==
Princess Irene of Greece and Denmark was born on 13 February 1904 in Athens. She had three elder brothers, George (1890), Alexander (1893) and Paul (1901), and one elder sister, Helen (1896). Another sister, Katherine was born in 1913. In 1927, her brother, George, announced her engagement to Prince Christian of Schaumburg-Lippe, a nephew of Christian X of Denmark, but no marriage occurred.

Princess Irene's paternal grandparents were King George I of Greece and his Queen, Grand Duchess Olga Konstantinovna of Russia. Her maternal grandparents were German Emperor Frederick III, and his Empress Consort, Victoria, Princess Royal. Empress Victoria was a daughter of Prince Albert of Saxe-Coburg and Gotha and Queen Victoria of the United Kingdom.

== Marriage and World War II ==
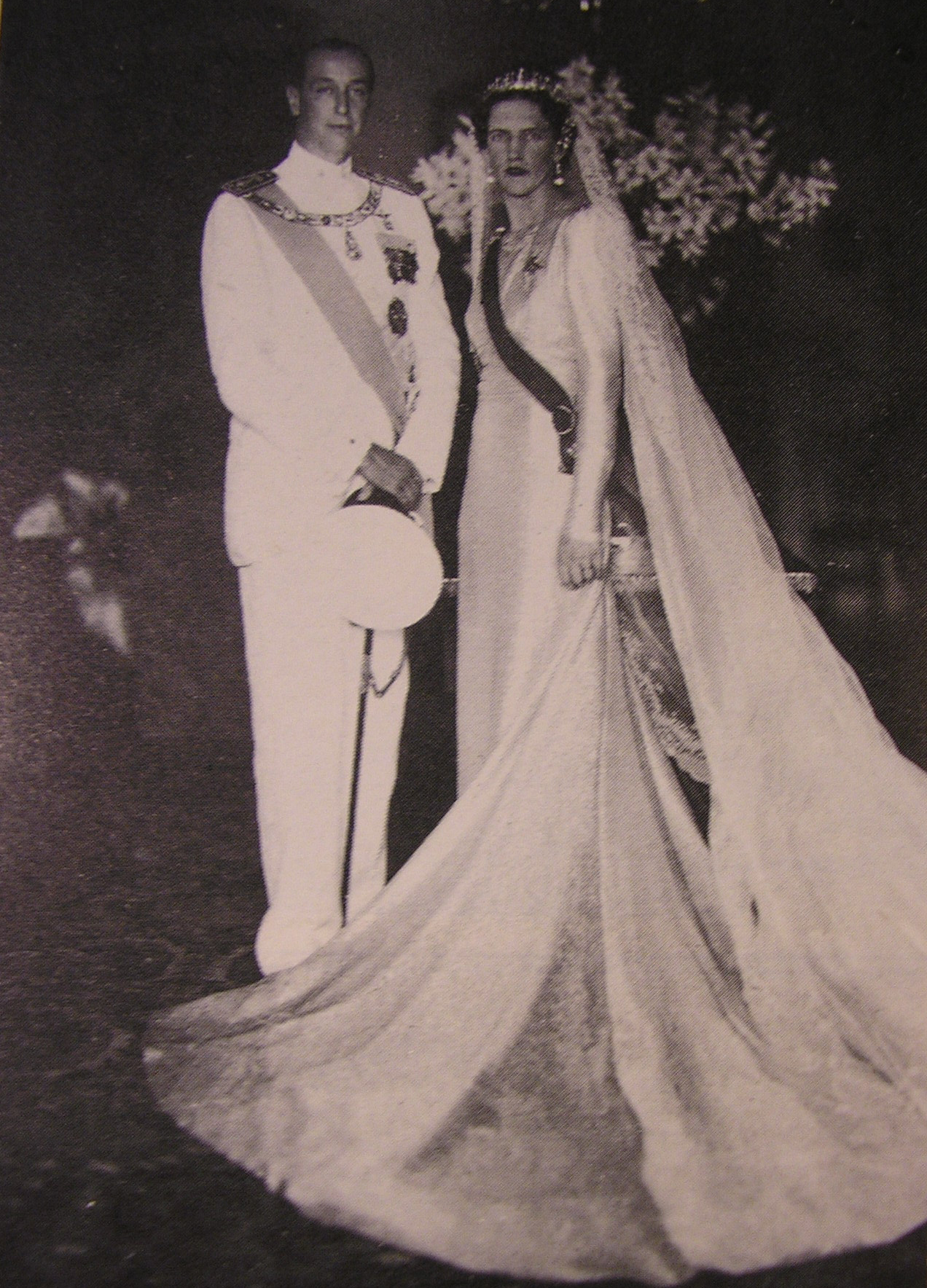
Princess Irene in her wedding

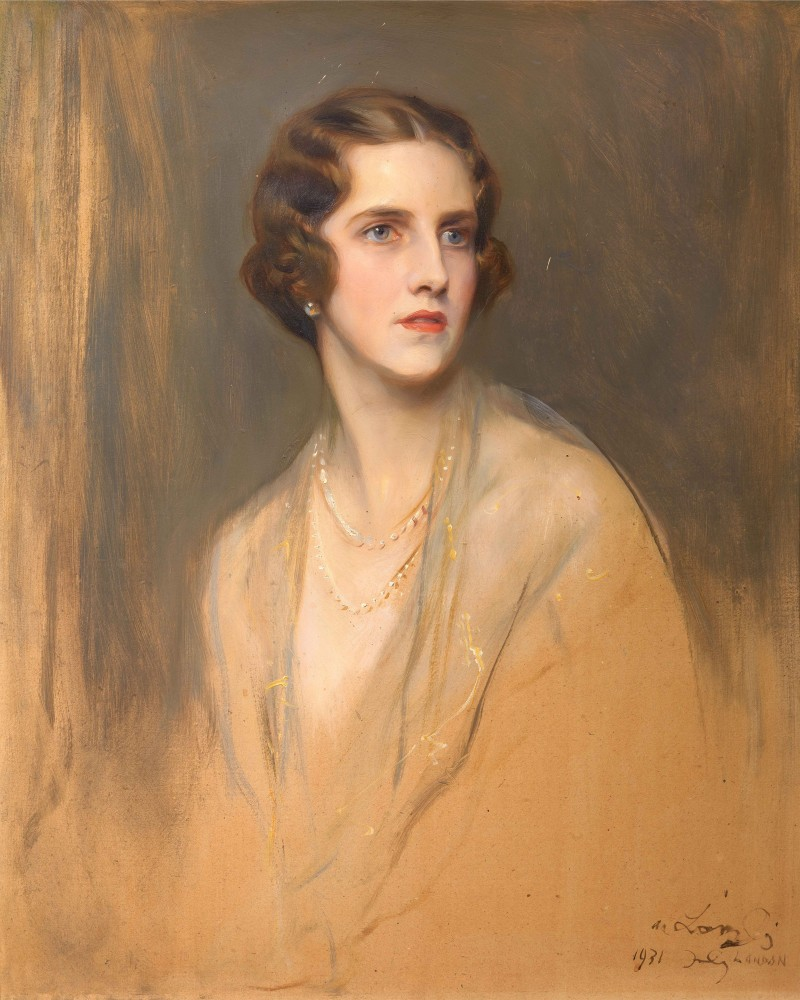
Portrait of Princess Irene by Philip de László , July 1931

The Greek princess had to officially renounce the Orthodox faith and convert to the Catholicism, as required by the laws of the House of Savoy. On 1 July 1939, Princess Irene married Prince Aimone, Duke of Spoleto, later 4th Duke of Aosta (9 March 1900 – 29 January 1948).They had one child:

- Prince Amedeo, 5th Duke of Aosta (27 September 1943 – 1 June 2021)

She was also a bridesmaid at the wedding of her cousin, Princess Marina of Greece and Denmark. In March 1942, Irene, who was a trained nurse, headed a Red Cross hospital train going to Russia to repatriate wounded Italian soldiers. After a difficult journey, she returned to Florence the following month. Prince Aimone became the 4th Duke of Aosta on 3 March 1942, following the death of his elder brother, Amedeo. On 18 May 1941, taking the name Tomislav II, he was proclaimed King of the Independent State of Croatia, a puppet state of fascist Germany and Italy, but he never set foot on the territory of the state and abdicated in 1943.

After the Allied armistice with the Kingdom of Italy, Irene was interned by the Germans at the Hotel Ifen in Hirschegg, Austria, July 1944, along with her infant son, her sister-in-law and two nieces. They were released by the French in May 1945.

== Post-war exile and death ==
Styles of Princess Irene of Grecce and Denmark
- Reference style: Her Royal Highness
- Spoken style: Your Royal Highness

After the war and the 1946 plebiscite which ended the monarchy in Italy, the family went into exile. Prince Aimone died on 29 January 1948 in Buenos Aires. Upon his death, his son Amedeo succeeded him as the 5th Duke of Aosta. In June 1948, the family was allowed to return to Italy, and Irene spent the rest of her life living outside of Florence where she became a member of the Dominican Third Order and continued her social work.

Irene died on 15 April 1974 in Fiesole, Italy, after fighting a long illness. Finally, in 1996, the ashes of the Duke and Duchess of Aosta were transferred to one of the necropolises of the House of Savoy, at the Basilica of Superga in Turin.

== Ancestry ==
Ancestors of Princess Irene, Duchess of Aosta

8. Christian IX of Denmark
4. George I of Greece
9. Princess Louise of Hesse-Kassel
2. Constantine I of Greece
10. Grand Duke Konstantin Nikolayevich of Russia
5. Grand Duchess Olga Constantinovna of Russia
11. Princess Alexandra of Saxe-Altenburg
1. Princess Irene of Greece and Denmark
12. William I, German Emperor
6. Frederick III, German Emperor
13. Princess Augusta of Saxe-Weimar-Eisenach
3. Princess Sophia of Prussia
14. Prince Albert of Saxe-Coburg and Gotha
7. Victoria, Princess Royal
15. Victoria of the United Kingdom
