= Luis Gómez-Acebo, Duke of Badajoz =

Spanish aristocrat (1934–1991)

His Excellency The Most Excellent The Duke of Badajoz, The Viscount of La Torre GE gcYC
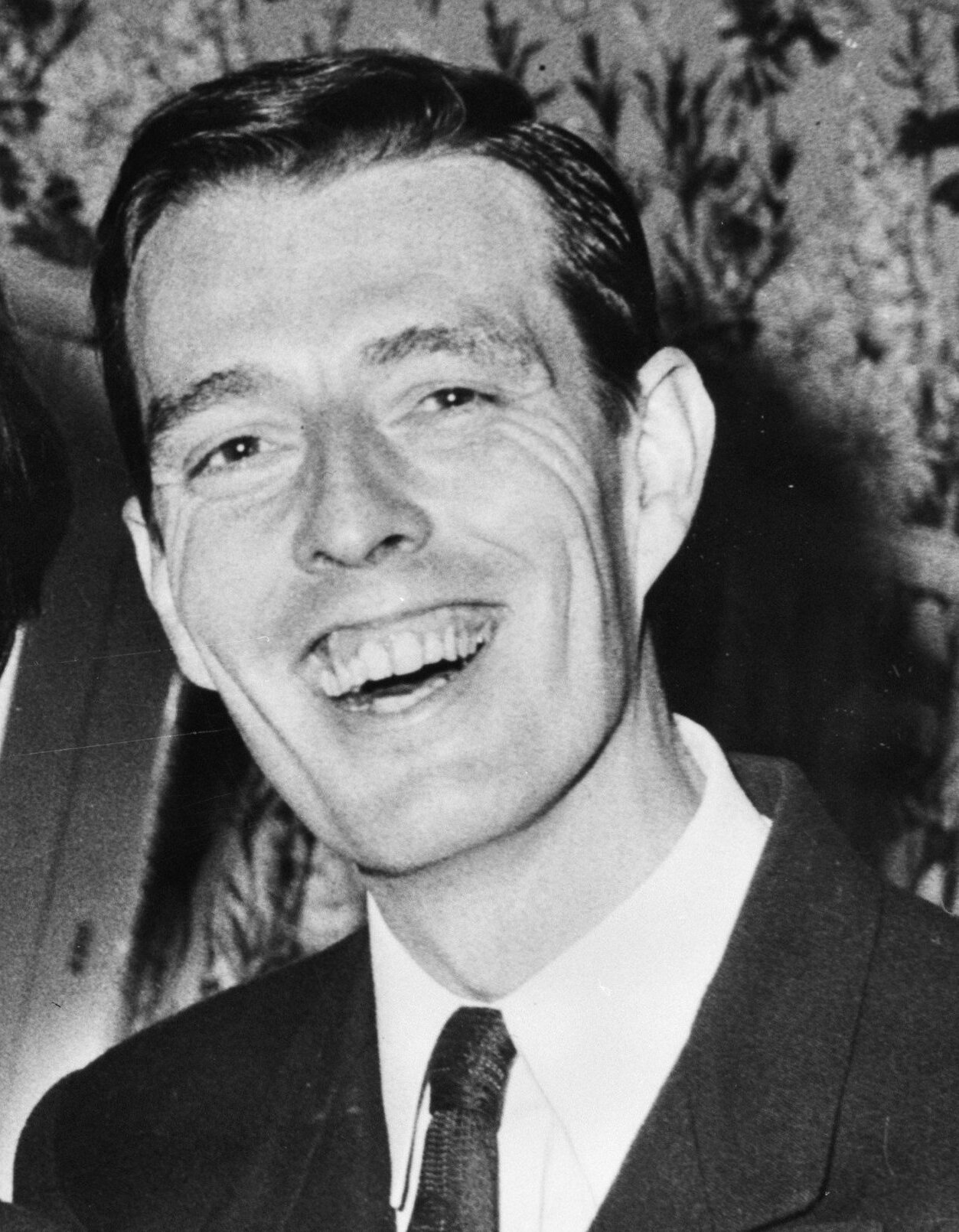
- Gómez-Acebo in 1967
- Born: Don Luis Gómez-Acebo y Duque de Estrada; 23 December 1934; Madrid, Spanish Republic
- Died: 9 March 1991 (aged 56); Madrid, Spain
- Burial place: Saint Isidore Cemetery, Madrid
- Education: Colegio del Pilar; University of Lille
- Spouse: Infanta Pilar of Spain (m. 1967)
- Children: 5
- Relatives: Tsaritsa Margarita of Bulgaria (cousin)

Don Luis Gómez-Acebo y Duque de Estrada, Duke of Badajoz, 2nd Viscount of La Torre, GE gcYC, (23 December 1934 – 9 March 1991) was a Spanish aristocrat and businessman. He was the husband of Infanta Pilar, sister of King Juan Carlos.

He held the Spanish peerages of viscount of La Torre suo jure and duke of Badajoz jure uxoris.

== Early life and education ==
Don Luis Gómez-Acebo y Duque de Estrada was born in Madrid on 23 December 1934. He was the fourth son of Don Jaime Gómez-Acebo y Modet (1897–1977), and his wife, Doña Isabel Duque de Estrada y Vereterra, 9th Marchioness of Deleitosa (1904–1979). Following the execution of her parents, his paternal first cousin Doña Margarita Gómez-Acebo y Cejuela, was placed in the care of his parents. He was educated at the Colegio del Pilar and studied business and law in Madrid, Lille and the United States.

== Career ==
From 1986, Gómez-Acebo was president of the Friends of the Museo del Prado. He was instrumental in convincing his personal friend Baron Hans Heinrich Thyssen-Bornemisza to bring his collection to Spain, forming the Thyssen-Bornemisza Museum. He was a knight of the Real Maestranza de Caballería de Sevilla.

== Marriage and family ==
Gómez-Acebo met his future wife, Infanta Pilar of Spain, at the Madrid home of Tsar Simeon II of Bulgaria, the husband of his cousin Margarita. They married on 5 May 1967 at the Jerónimos Monastery in Lisbon, Portugal, where the bride's father, the Count of Barcelona, was living in exile.

Despite being of noble birth, being descended from the marquesses of Deleitosa and Cortina, Gómez-Acebo did not belong to a royal house and Infanta Pilar lost her succession rights when she married him, a stipulation of the pragmatic sanction on marriage introduced by Carlos III.

One month before the wedding, Generalísimo Francisco Franco revived the viscounty of La Torre for him. Additionally, the Count of Barcelona created his daughter Duchess of Badajoz, thus Gómez-Acebo became Duke consort. King Juan Carlos confirmed this title when the Spanish monarchy was restored.

They had five children:

- Doña María de Fátima Simoneta Luisa Gómez-Acebo y Borbón (31 October 1968)
- Don Juan Filiberto Nicolás Gómez-Acebo y Borbón, later 3rd Viscount of La Torre (6 December 1969 – 12 August 2024)
- Don Bruno Alejandro Gómez-Acebo y Borbón (15 June 1971)
- Don Luis Beltrán Ataúlfo Alfonso Gómez-Acebo y Borbón (20 May 1973)
- Don Fernando Humberto Gómez-Acebo y Borbón (30 September 1974 – 1 March 2024)

Gómez-Acebo died of lymphoma on 9 March 1991, aged 56. He is buried in Saint Isidore Cemetery in Madrid.

== Honours and arms ==
=== Honours ===
- 16 July 1973: Grand Cross of the Order of Civil Merit
- 23 June 1989: Knight Grand Cross of the Order of Isabella the Catholic (gcYC)

=== Arms ===
Gómez-Acebo's amrs

Spanish nobility
Vacant Title last held by Juan de Mendoza y Posada	Viscount of La Torre; 18 April 1967 – 9 March 1991	Succeeded by Juan Gómez-Acebo y Borbón
