= Saint Isidore Cemetery =

Cemetery in Madrid, Spain

- Cementerio de San Isidro
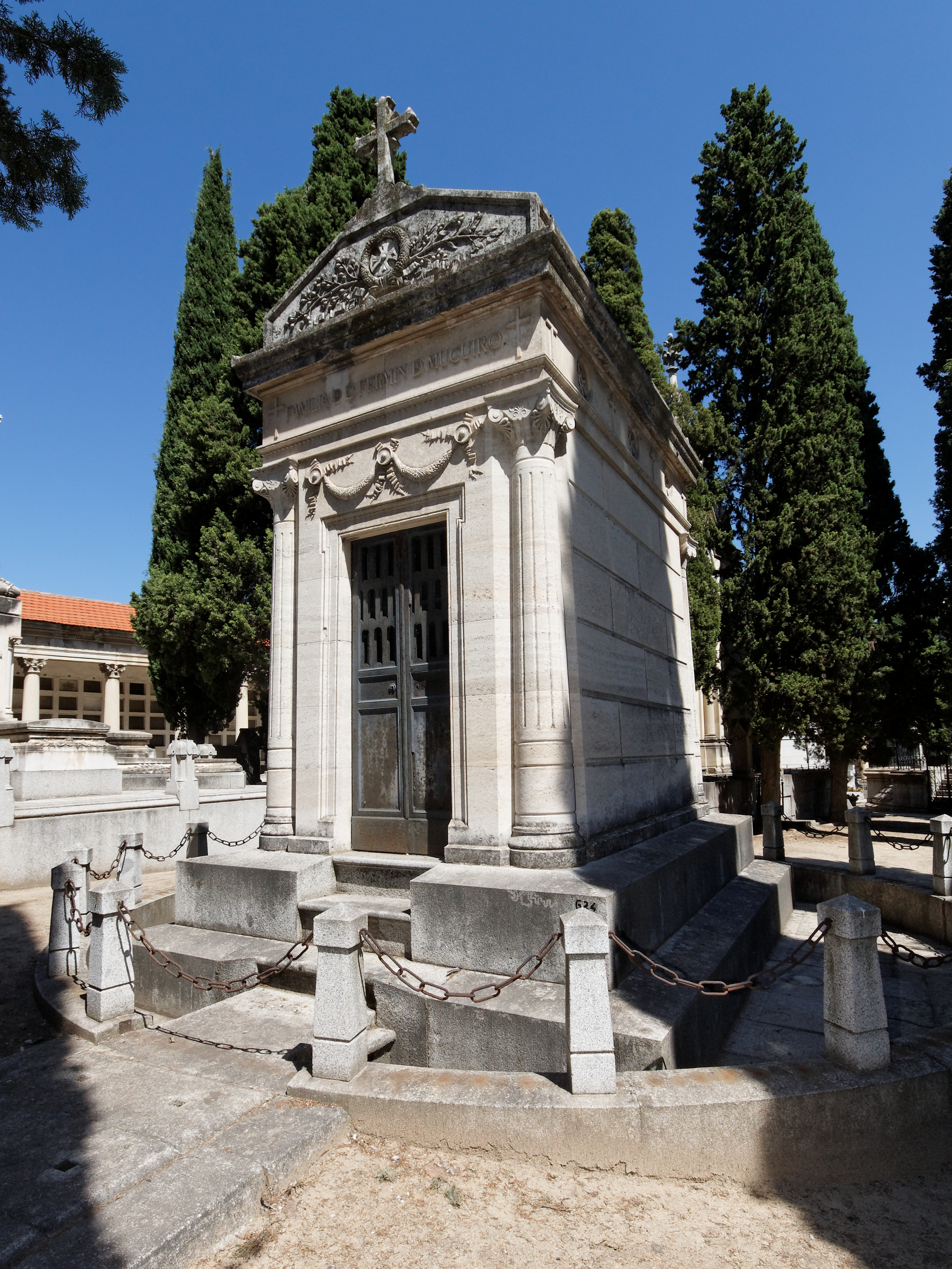

- Location within Spain
- Alternative names: Pontifical and Royal Sacramental Arch-confraternity of St Peter, St Andrew, St Isidore and of the Immaculate Conception
- Etymology: Saint Isidore the Farmer

General information
- Status: Active cemetery
- Type: Cemetery
- Architectural style: Various
- Location: Calle Ermita del Santo 78, Madrid, Spain
- Coordinates: 40°24′03″N 3°43′40″W
- Construction started: 1811
- Inaugurated: 1811
- Owner: Archicofradía Sacramental de San Pedro San Andrés y San Isidro
- Affiliation: Catholic Church

Technical details
- Floor area: 120,000 m^{2} (1,300,000 sq ft)

Design and construction
- Architect: José Llorente

Website
- www.cementeriodesanisidro.com

Saint Isidore Cemetery is a monumental cemetery in the Spanish capital Madrid. Its first courtyard was erected in 1811 and new expansions were added throughout the 19th Century. Its central courtyard, called "Patio de la Concepción" (Conception courtyard) boasts a notable group of mausolea. This cemetery is the resting place of many famous Spaniards, including artists, politicians and poets.

== History ==
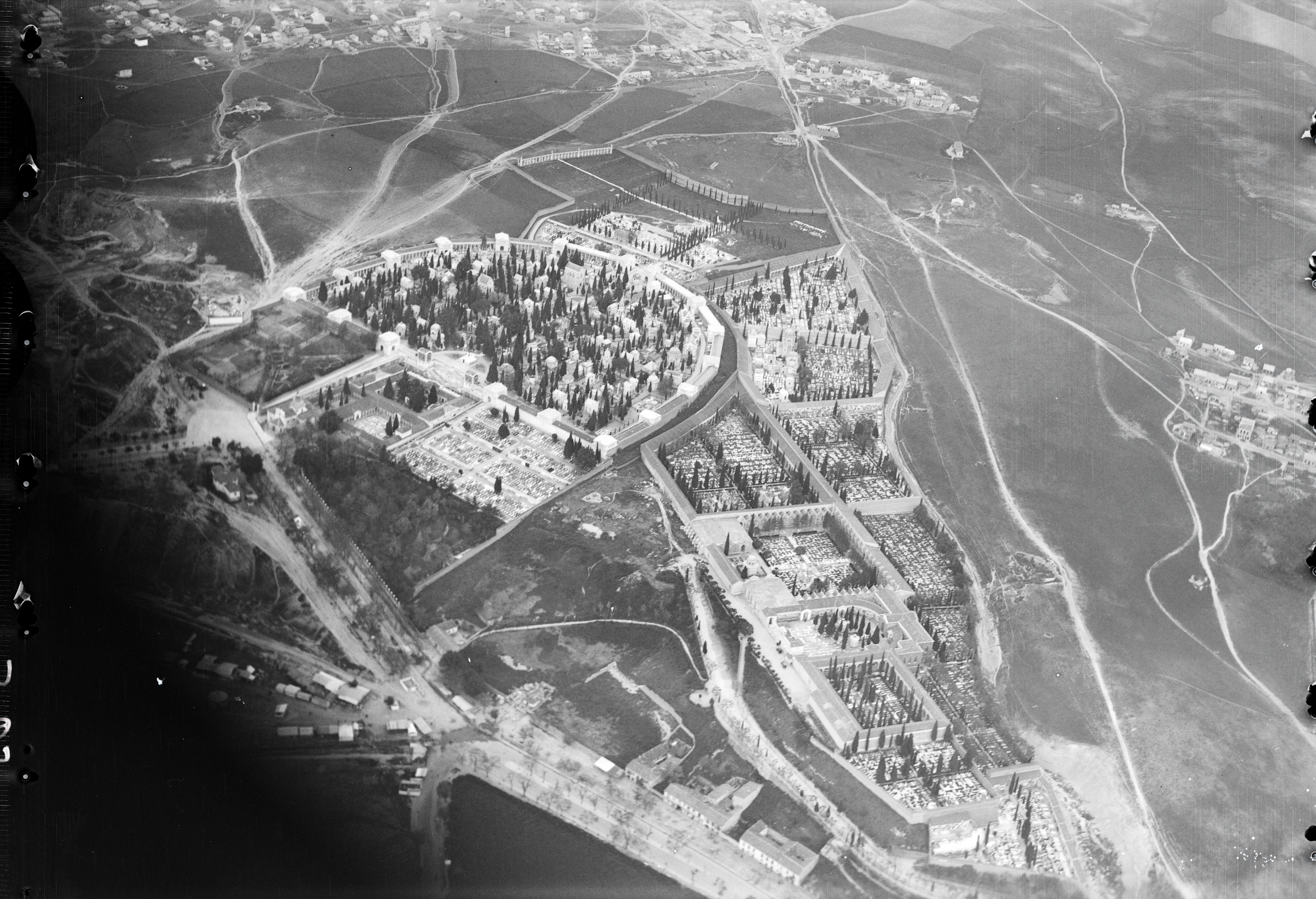
St Isidore Cemetery (left) and St Just cemetery (right), ca. 1928.

The cemetery is located on the upper right side of the Manzanares river, between the Segovia and Toledo bridges. Its full name, "Pontifical and Royal Sacramental Arch-confraternity of St Peter, St Andrew, St Isidore and of the Immaculate Conception" reveals its origins: the arch-confraternity resulted from the 1587 merger of the confraternities of the parishes of St Peter the Royal, St Andrew the apostle, the Immaculate Conception and St Isidore the Labourer. All these fraternities included among their duties the dignified burial of deceased members, for which purpose a request was made to open a cemetery in what was then the outskirts of Madrid, near the hermitage of St Isidore.

The first burial was performed in 1811.

Throughout the 19th century, St Isidore became the cemetery of Madrid's nobility. It became the final resting place of choice for aristocrats, bourgeoisie, politicians and artists. For this reason its seven courtyards boast a multitude of mausolea of great architectural and artistic quality. The architects and artists used all means at their disposal, embellishing their work with sculptural elements and employing highly skilled stonemasons, smiths, enamelers and stained glass craftsmen. Among the architects we find many of the great names of the period, such as Ricardo Velázquez Bosco, the Marquis of Cubas, Ortiz de Villajos, Arturo Mélida, Agustín Querol, Segundo de Lema, etc. It was not unusual for architects to find themselves erecting grandiose mausolea in neobyzantine, neo-mudéjar or neo-gothic style for the same clients who had commissioned much less adventurously styled houses in the ever-expanding city. St Isidore remains an active cemetery and is considered one of Europe's most interesting graveyards. An attempt was made to have the cemetery recognized by the Spanish heritage register for listed status as Bien de Interés Cultural (of cultural heritage interest), though to date the relevant application remains under consideration.

== Characteristics ==
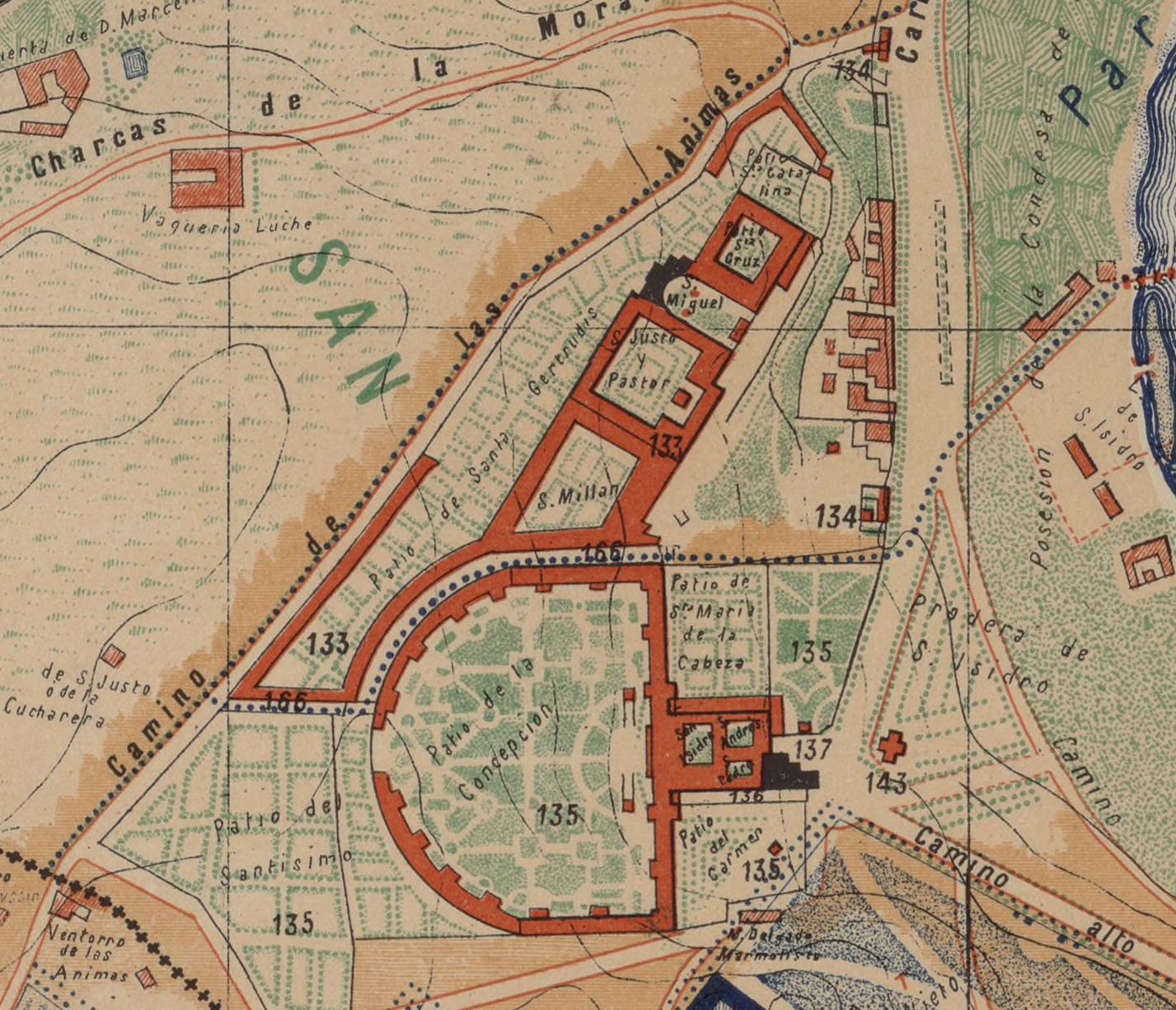
St Isidore and St Just at the beginning of the 20th Century.

It is located in the Carabanchel district of Madrid, behind the hermitage of St Isidore on the so-called "hill of souls" (cerro de ánimas) near Via Carpetana street and bordered on one side by Ermita del Santo avenue.

The three oldest of the seven courtyards that comprise the cemetery are of rectangular shape and cloistered structure and contain the niches, giving them the most sober appearance. The oldest courtyard is that of St Peter, built in 1811 by the architect José Llorente. Here can also be found the tombs of Antonio Fraseri (Ferdinand VII's physician), Bernardo Conde (director of the Buen Retiro Porcelain Factory), the count of Campomanes and the Madrazo family. The courtyard of St Andrew would follow later, in 1829, also designed by Llorente, followed by the courtyard of St Isidro by José Alejandro Álvarez in 1842. A new expansion was necessary mid-century and the courtyard of the Conception, designed by Francisco Enríquez y Ferrer in neoroman colonnades and turrets was built, containing a formidable group of mausolea in all different styles of the 19th century. Throughout the 20th century, these structures continued to be built, though their boom period was during the Spanish restoration.

== Notable burials ==
- Leandro Fernández de Moratín (1760–1828), Spanish playwright and poet.
- Marquess of San Isidro (1806–1885), Spanish noble, politician and army officer.
- Conde de Campomanes (1723–1802), Spanish politician.
- Ángel de Saavedra y Ramírez de Baquedano, Duque de Rivas, (1791–1865) Spanish poet, dramatist and politician.
- Diego de León (1807–1841), Count Belascoaín.
- Manuel Montes de Oca (1804–1841), Spanish naval commander and politician.
- Francisco Javier de Istúriz (1790–1871), Spanish President.
- Ramón de Mesonero Romanos (1803–1882), Spanish author.
- Frances Mary ("Fanny") Keats (1803–1889), the younger sister of John Keats.
- José de Salamanca y Mayol (1811–1883), Spanish politician and financier, Marquis of Salamanca.
- Emilio Castelar (1832–1899), Spanish politician, historian, journalist and writer. President of the Executive during the First Spanish Republic.
- Francisco Silvela (1843–1905), Spanish politician.
- Segismundo Moret (1833–1913), Spanish politician and writer.
- Fernando Primo de Rivera y Orbaneja (1879–1921), Spanish politician and soldier.
- Consuelo Vello Cano «La Fornarina» (1885–1915), Spanish cupletista.
- José Echegaray (1832–1916), Spanish politician, playwright and mathematician.
- Leonardo Torres Quevedo (1852–1936), Spanish engineer, mathematician and inventor.
- Antonio Maura (1853–1925), Spanish politician and president of the council of ministers.
- Miguel Primo de Rivera (1870–1930), Spanish aristocrat and military officer, Prime Minister of Spain 1923–1930. His remains were later moved to the Basílica de la Merced in Jerez de la Frontera.
- Felipe de Lazcano y Morales de Setién (1868–1951), lawyer, businessman, politician and financier.
- Ante Pavelić (1889–1959), Croatian fascist dictator and leader of the Ustaše.
- Fulgencio Batista (1901–1973), Cuban soldier, politician and dictator.
- Miguel Boyer (1939–2014), Spanish economist, academic and former minister.
- Kardam, Prince of Turnovo (1962–2015).
- Concha Piquer (1908–1990), singer.
- Luis Gómez-Acebo, Duke of Badajoz (1934–1991)
- Infanta Pilar, Duchess of Badajoz (1936–2020).
- José Antonio Primo de Rivera (1903–1936, reinterred 2023), founder of fascist Falange Española de las JONS. Transferred from Valley of Cuelgamuros (formerly Valley of the Fallen) in April 2023.
- Juan Meléndez Valdés (1754-1817), Spanish poet.
- Juan Donoso Cortés (1809-1853), Spanish author.
- Francisco Asenjo Barbieri (1823-1894), Spanish composer.
- Ricardo Bellver (1845-1924), Spanish sculptor.

== See also ==
- Cementerio de San Isidro, Madrid (Spanish Wikipedia article)
- Mausoleo conjunto de Goya, Meléndez Valdés, Donoso y Moratín (Spanish Wikipedia article)
