= José Echegaray =

Spanish politician, engineer, and scientist

The Most Excellent José Echegaray
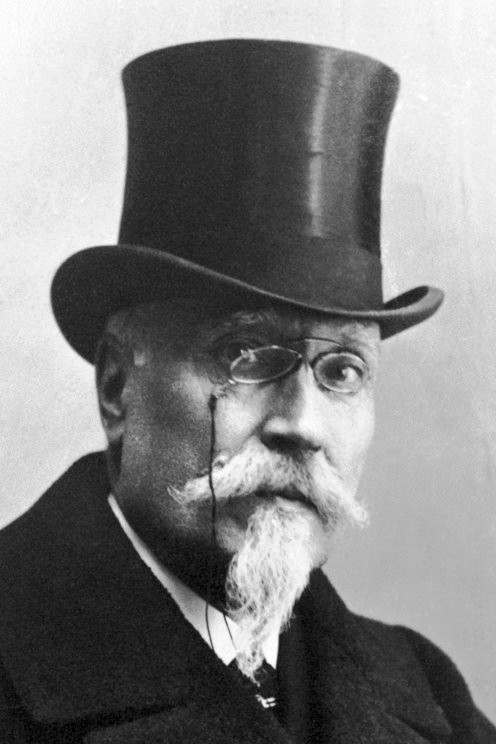
- Echegaray in 1904
- Born: José Echegaray y Eizaguirre; 19 April 1832; Madrid, Spain
- Died: 14 September 1916 (aged 84); Madrid, Spain
- Resting place: Saint Isidore Cemetery
- Occupations: Dramatist, civil engineer and mathematician
- Relatives: Verónica Echegui
- Writing career
- Genre: Drama
- Notable awards: Nobel Prize in Literature; 1904

Seat e of the Real Academia Española
- In office 20 May 1894 – 14 September 1916
- Preceded by: Ramón de Mesonero Romanos
- Succeeded by: Julio Burell y Cuéllar (Note: Burell was elected for the position in 1916 but never took the seat)

José Echegaray y Eizaguirre (Spanish: [xoˈse etʃeɣaˈɾaj]; 19 April 1832 – 14 September 1916) was a Spanish civil engineer, mathematician, politician, and one of the leading dramatists of the last quarter of the 19th century. He was awarded the 1904 Nobel Prize in Literature "in recognition of the numerous and brilliant compositions which, in an individual and original manner, have revived the great traditions of the Spanish drama."

== Early life and education ==
He was born in Madrid on 19 April 1832. His father, a doctor and institute professor of Greek, was from Aragon and his mother was from Navarra. He spent his childhood in Murcia, where he finished his elementary school education. It was there, at the Murcia Institute, where he first gained his love for mathematics. While still a child he read Goethe, Homer, and Balzac, readings that alternated with those of mathematicians like Gauss, Legendre, and Lagrange.

In order to earn enough money to attend the Escuela Técnica Superior de Ingeniería de Caminos, Canales y Puertos (Engineering School of Roads, Channels and Ports), he moved at the age of fourteen to Madrid. At the age of twenty, he left the Madrid School with a Civil Engineering degree, which he had obtained as first in his class, and he had to move to Almeria and Granada to begin working at his first job.

== Academic career ==
In 1854 he began teaching a class at the Engineering School, working as a secretary there also. He taught mathematics, stereotomy, hydraulics, descriptive geometry, and differential and physical calculus from that year until 1868. From 1858 to 1860 he was also a professor at the Assistants' School of Public Works.

His Problemas de geometría analítica (1865) and Teorías modernas de la física. Unidad de las fuerzas materiales (1867) were held in some regard. He became a member of the Society of Political Economy, helped to found the magazine La Revista, and took a prominent part in propagating free trade doctrines in the press and on the platform.

He was clearly marked out for office, and when the revolution of 1868 overthrew the monarchy, he resigned his post for a place in the revolutionary cabinet.

== Political Career ==
Echegaray served as a founding member of the republican Radical Democratic Party, and was eventually appointed Minister of Education, Minister of Public Works, and eventually Finance Minister successively between 1867 and 1874. He retired from politics after the Bourbon restoration in 1874.

== Writing ==
Theater had always been the love of José Echegaray's life. Although he had written earlier plays (La Hija natural and La Última Noche, both in 1867), he truly became a dramatist in 1874. His plays reflected his sense of duty, which had made him famous during his time in the governmental offices. Dilemmas centered on duty and morality are the motif of his plays. He replicated the achievements of his predecessors of the Spanish Golden Age, remaining a prolific playwright.

His most famous play is El gran Galeoto, a drama written in the grand nineteenth century manner of melodrama. It is about the poisonous effect that unfounded gossip has on a middle-aged man's happiness. Echegaray filled it with elaborate stage instructions that illuminate what we would now consider a hammy style of acting popular in the 19th century. Paramount Pictures filmed it as a silent with the title changed to The World and His Wife, and it was the basis for a later film The Great Galeoto. His most remarkable plays are O locura o santidad (Saint or Madman?, 1877); Mariana (1892); El estigma (1895); La duda, 1898; and El loco Dios (God, the fool, 1900).

Among his other famous plays are La esposa del vengador (1874) (The Avenger's Wife); En el puño de la espada (1875) (In the Sword's Handle); En el pilar y en la cruz (1878) (On the Stake and on the Cross); and Conflicto entre dos deberes (1882) (Conflict of Two Duties).

Along with the Provençal poet Frédéric Mistral, he was awarded the Nobel Prize for Literature in 1904, after having been nominated that year by a member of the Royal Spanish Academy, making him the first Spaniard to win the prize.

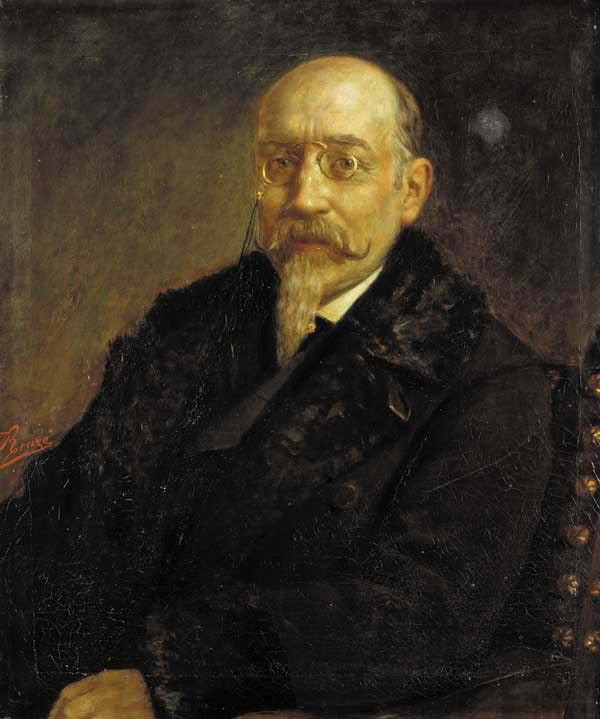
José Echegaray

José Echegaray maintained constant activity until his death on 14 September 1916 in Madrid. His extensive work did not stop growing in his old age: in the final stage of his life he wrote 25 or 30 mathematical physics volumes. At the age of 83 he commented:

I cannot die, because if I am going to write my mathematical physics encyclopedia, I need at least 25 more years.

== Awards and honors ==
Several streets in Spain are named after José Echegaray. Calle Echegaray in Madrid's Barrio de las Letras is especially noteworthy. In 1971 the Bank of Spain issued a 1000-peseta banknote in his honor.

== Works ==
=== Plays ===
- La hija Natural (1865)
- El libro talonario (1874)
- La esposa del vengador (1874)
- La última noche (1875)
- En el puño de la espada (1875)
- Un sol que nace y un sol que muere (1876)
- Cómo empieza y cómo acaba (1876)
- El gladiador de Rávena (1876)
- Locura o santidad (1876).
- O locura o santidad (1877)
- Iris de paz (1877)
- Para tal culpa, tal pena (1877)
- Lo que no puede decirse (1877)
- En el pilar y en la cruz (1878)
- Correr en pos de un ideal (1878)
- Algunas veces aquí (1878)
- Morir por no despertar (1879)
- En el seno de la muerte (1879)
- Bodas trágicas (1879)
- Mar sin orillas (1879)
- La muerte en los labios (1880)
- El gran galeoto (1881)
- Haroldo el normando (1881)
- Los dos curiosos impertinentes (1881)
- Conflicto entre dos deberes (1882)
- Un milagro en Egipto (1884)
- Piensa mal ... ¿y acertarás? (1884)
- La peste de Otranto (1884)
- Vida alegre y muerte triste (1885)
- El bandido Lisandro (1885)
- De mala raza(1886)
- Dos fanatismos (1886)
- El Conde Lotario (1887)
- La realidad y el delirio (1887)
- EL hijo de hierro y el hijo de carne (1888)
- Lo sublime en lo vulgar (1888)
- Manantial que no se agota (1889)
- Los rígidos (1889)
- Siempre en ridículo (1890)
- El prólogo de un drama (1890)
- Irene de Otranto (1890)
- Un crítico incipiente (1891)
- Comedia sin desenlace (1891)
- Mariana (1891)
- El hijo de Don Juan (1892)
- Sic vos non vobis o la última limosna
- El poder de la impotencia (1893)
- A la orilla del mar (1893)
- La rencorosa (1894)
- Mancha que limpia (1895)
- El primer acto de un Drama (1895)
- El estigma (1895)
- La cantante callejera (1895)
- Amor salvaje (1896)
- Semíramis o La hija del aire (1896)
- La calumnia por castigo (1897)
- La duda (1897)
- El hombre negro (1898)
- Silencio de muerte (1898)
- El loco Dios (1900)
- Malas herencias (1902)
- La escalinata de una trono(1903)
- La desequilibrada(1904)
- A fuerza de arrastrarse (1905)
- La última limosna (1905)
- El preferido y los cenicientos (1908)
