= Ramón de Mesonero Romanos =

Spanish writer

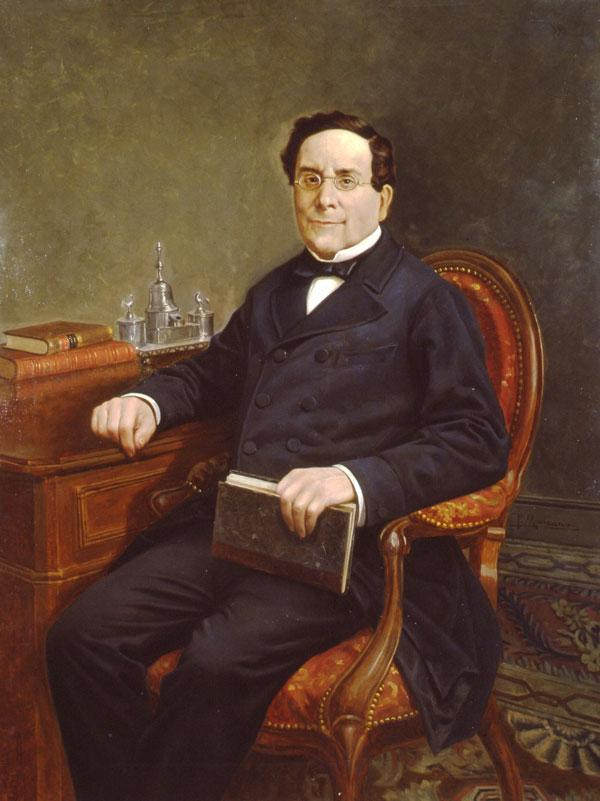
- Born: Ramón de Mesonero Romanos; 19 July 1803; Madrid, Spain
- Died: 30 April 1882 (aged 78); Madrid, Spain

Seat e of the Real Academia Española
- In office 25 February 1847 – 30 April 1882
- Preceded by: Seat established
- Succeeded by: José Echegaray

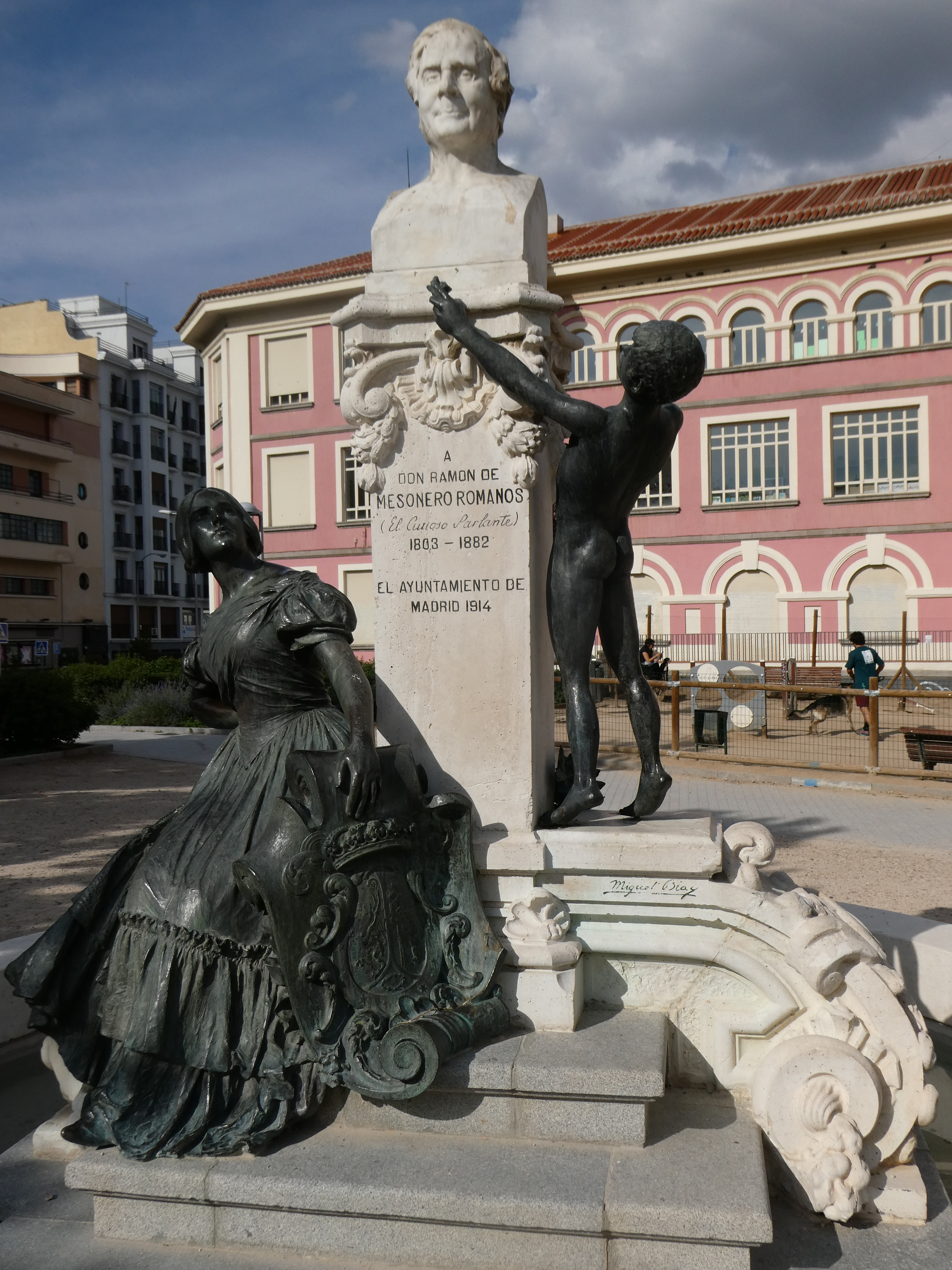
Statue in Madrid

Ramón de Mesonero Romanos (19 July 1803 – 30 April 1882) was a Spanish prose writer who was born in Madrid.

== Biography ==
At an early age, he became interested in the history and topography of his native city. His Guía de Madrid (1831) was published when literature was at a low ebb in Spain, but the author's curious researches and direct style charmed the public. Next year, in a review entitled Cartas españolas, under the pseudonym "El Curioso Parlante", he began a series of articles on the social life of the capital, which were subsequently collected and called Panorama matritense (1835–1836).

Mesonero Romanos was elected to the Spanish Academy in 1838 and, though he continued to write, had somewhat outlived his fame when he issued his pleasing autobiography, Memorias de un Setentón, natural y vecino de Madrid (1880). He died in Madrid, shortly after the publication of his Obras completas (8 vols, 410, 1881). His place of burial is the Saint Isidore Cemetery in Madrid.
