= Duchess of Badajoz =

Title in Spanish peerage

Dukedom of Badajoz
- Arms of the Infanta Pilar, Duchess of Badajoz
- Creation date: 17 April 1967
- Creation: First
- Created by: Infante Juan, Count of Barcelona
- Peerage: Peerage of Spain
- First holder: Infanta Pilar
- Last holder: Infanta Pilar
- Status: Reverted to the Crown
- Extinction date: 8 January 2020

Duchess of Badajoz is a substantive title in the Spanish nobility. The title is a Title of the Royal House (Spanish: Título de la Casa Real), a type of title that is not hereditary and is granted for life to a member of the Royal Family.

Named after the city of Badajoz, in Extremadura, it was created on 17 April 1967 by Infante Juan, Count of Barcelona, for his daughter, the Infanta Pilar, on the occasion of her marriage to Luis Gómez-Acebo in 1967. It does not include any territorial landholdings and does not produce any revenue for the title-holder.

Following the Duchess's death in 2020, the title reverted to the Crown.

== Duchess of Badajoz ==
=== First creation, 1967–2020 ===
| Duchess | Portrait | Birth | Marriage(s) | Death |
|---|---|---|---|---|
| Infanta Pilar; House of Bourbon-Anjou; 1967–2020 | Infanta Pilar | 30 July 1936; Ville Saint Blaise, Cannes, France daughter of Infante Juan, Count of Barcelona and Princess María de las Mercedes of Bourbon-Two Sicilies | Luis Gómez-Acebo; 5 May 1967 | 8 January 2020; Ruber International Hospital, Madrid, Spain aged 83 |
