= Infanta Pilar, Duchess of Badajoz =

Spanish infanta (1936–2020)

Infanta Pilar
- Duchess of Badajoz; Viscountess of La Torre
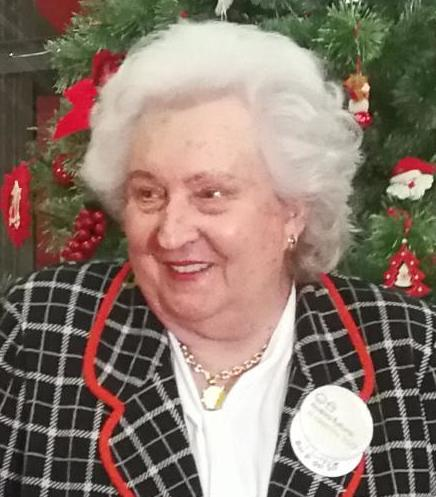
- Pilar de Borbón in 2017
- Born: 30 July 1936; Ville Saint Blaise, Cannes, France
- Died: 8 January 2020 (aged 83); Ruber International Hospital, Madrid, Spain
- Burial: Saint Isidore Cemetery, Madrid
- Spouse: Luis Gómez-Acebo y Duque de Estrada, 2nd Viscount of La Torre (m. 1967; died 1991)
- Issue: Doña Simoneta Gómez-Acebo y Borbón; Don Juan Gómez-Acebo y Borbón, 3rd Viscount of La Torre; Don Bruno Gómez-Acebo y Borbón; Don Luis Gómez-Acebo y Borbón; Don Fernando Gómez-Acebo y Borbón
Names
- María del Pilar Alfonsa Juana Victoria Luisa Ignacia y Todos los Santos de Borbón y Borbón
- House: Bourbon-Anjou
- Father: Infante Juan, Count of Barcelona
- Mother: Princess María de las Mercedes of Bourbon-Two Sicilies

Infanta Pilar, Duchess of Badajoz, Viscountess of La Torre (Spanish: María del Pilar Alfonsa Juana Victoria Luisa Ignacia y Todos los Santos de Borbón y Borbón; 30 July 1936 – 8 January 2020), sometimes known more simply as Pilar de Borbón, was the elder daughter of Infante Juan, Count of Barcelona and Princess María Mercedes of the Two Sicilies, and older sister of King Juan Carlos I.

== Early life ==
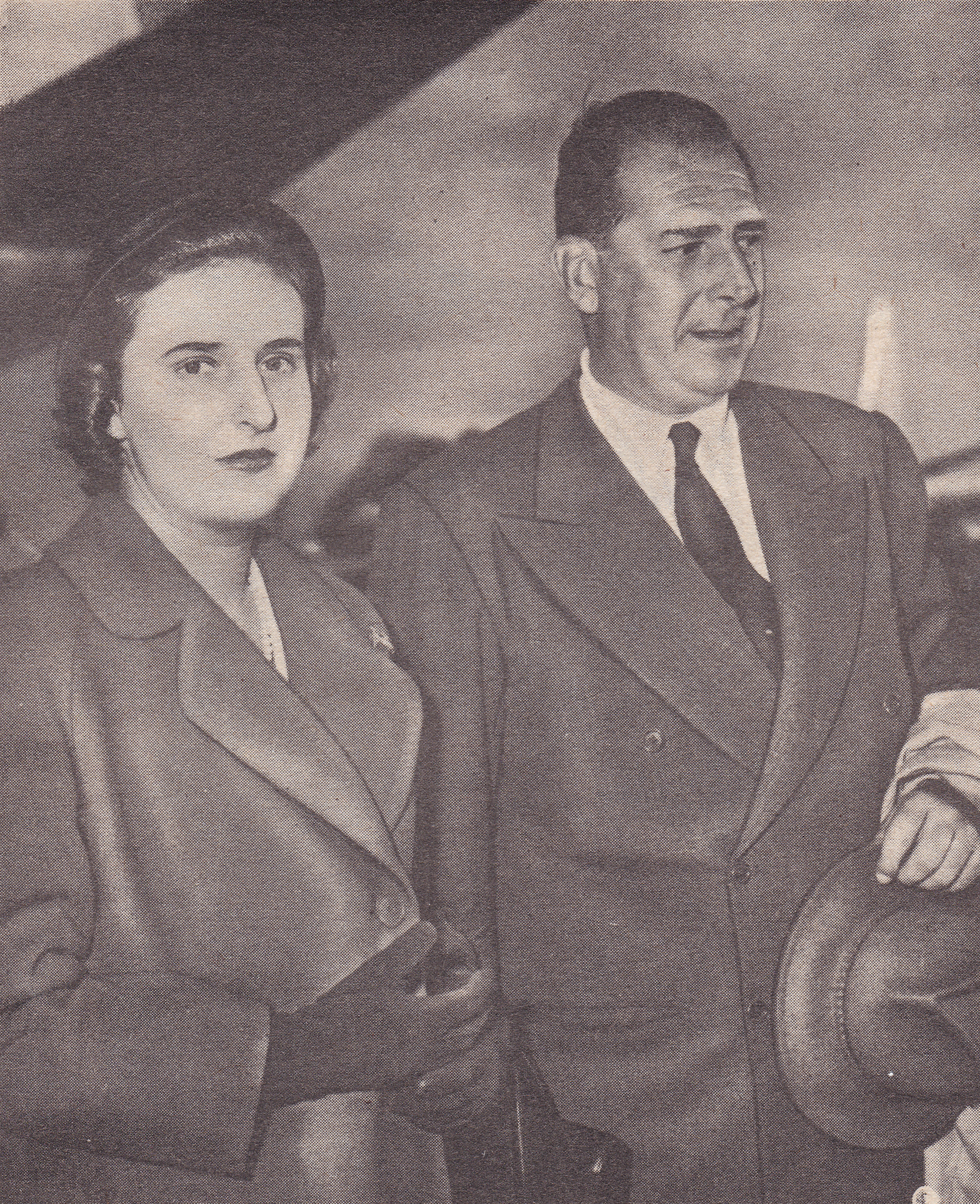
Pilar with her father in 1957

Infanta Pilar was the firstborn daughter of Juan de Borbón y Battenberg and María de las Mercedes de Borbón y Orleans, Count and Countess of Barcelona, she was born in Ville Saint Blaise, home of the counts of Barcelona in Cannes (Alpes-Maritimes, France), on 30 July 1936. She was baptized in Cannes, in the church of Rins, with the name of María del Pilar Alfonsa Juana Victoria Luisa Ignacia de Todos los Santos de Borbón y Borbón. Her godparents were her paternal grandfather, King Alfonso XIII and her maternal grandmother the Princess Louise of Orléans, although Alfonso XIII acted by delegation as he did not want to meet his wife Queen Victoria Eugenia. From her birth, as the daughter of the heir to the Crown of Spain she was given the title of Infanta of Spain with treatment of Royal Highness. However, the official recognition of that title came when her brother was already King of Spain.

When she was an infant, the family moved to Rome where the Spanish Royal Family settled in exile. In 1941, after the resignation of Alfonso XIII, her father became the holder of the dynastic rights of the Spanish Crown in exile. During World War II she lived at Lausanne in Switzerland, where her grandmother, Queen Victoria Eugenia, lived. In 1946 the family resettled at Estoril in Portugal.

Together with her parents and her brother Juan Carlos, she took part in the ship tour organized by Queen Frederica and her husband King Paul of Greece in 1954, which became known as the “Cruise of the Kings” and was attended by over 100 royals from all over Europe. On this trip, Juan Carlos met the hosts' 15-year-old daughter, Sofia, his future wife, for the first time.

Her family attempted to marry her to Baudouin of Belgium, who ended up marrying Fabiola de Mora instead.

At the wedding of her brother Juan Carlos I of Spain with Princess Sofía of Greece, in 1962, she was one of eight bridesmaids.

== Marriage and family ==
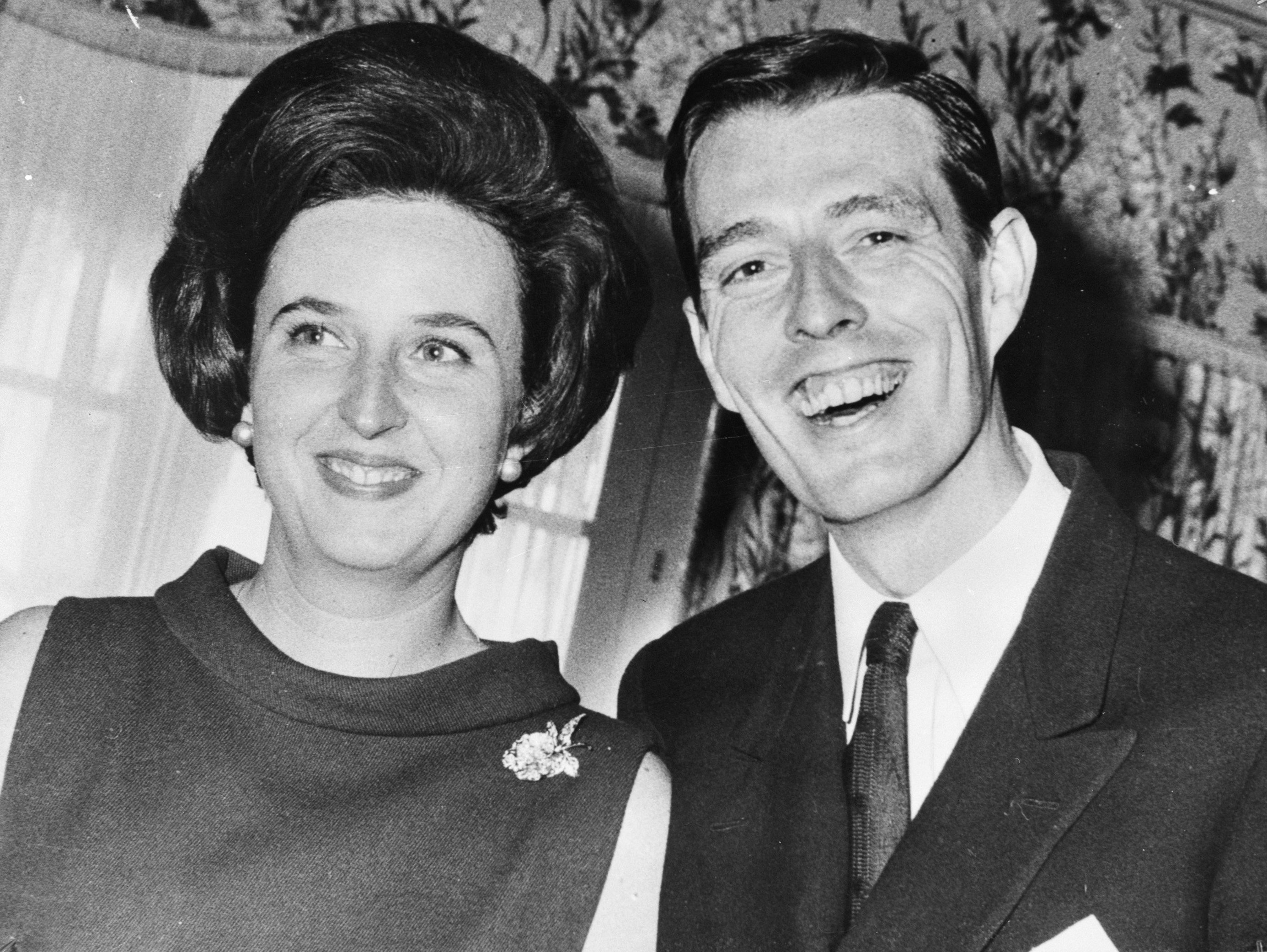
Pilar de Borbón with Luis Gómez-Acebo in 1967

Pilar needed to renounce her rights of succession to the Spanish throne to marry a commoner as stipulated by the Pragmatic Sanction of Charles III on marriages of members of the royal family.

She married Luis Gómez-Acebo y Duque de Estrada, 2nd Viscount of La Torre (23 December 1934 – 9 March 1991) on 5 May 1967 in Lisbon, Portugal at Jerónimos Monastery. To honor the marriage, Infante Juan, Count of Barcelona, created her Duchess of Badajoz.

They had five children:

- Doña María de Fátima Simoneta Luisa Gómez-Acebo y Borbón (b. 31 October 1968) she married José Miguel Fernández-Sastrón (b. 1959) on 12 September 1990. They divorced on 16 October 2012.
  - Juan Fernández-Sastrón y Gómez-Acebo (b. 23 September 1991)
  - Pablo Fernandez-Sastrón y Gómez-Acebo (b. 4 May 1995)
  - María de las Mercedes Fernández-Sastrón y Gómez-Acebo (b. 17 January 2000)
- Don Juan Filiberto Nicolás Gómez-Acebo y Borbón, later 3rd Viscount of La Torre (6 December 1969 – 12 August 2024) he married Winston Holmes Carney (b. 1970) on 2 January 2014. They separated in May 2019.
  - Nicolás Gómez-Acebo y Carney, later 4th Viscount of La Torre (b. April 2013)
- Don Bruno Alejandro Gómez-Acebo y Borbón (b. 15 June 1971) he married Bárbara Cano y de la Plaza in 2002. They had three sons, Alejandro (b. 5 November 2004), Guillermo (b. 23 November 2005) and Alvaro (b. 30 May 2011). They separated in October 2025.
- Don Luis Beltrán Ataúlfo Alfonso Gómez-Acebo y Borbón (b. 20 May 1973) his first marriage was to Laura Ponte y Martinez (b. 1973) on 18 September 2004. They had two children, Luis (b. 1 July 2005) and Laura (b. 1 July 2006.) They separated in 2009 and divorced in 2011. His second marriage is to Andrea Pascual y Vicens (b. 1980). It took place on 22 February 2016. They have a son, Juan (b. 17 July 2016).
- Don Fernando Humberto Gómez-Acebo y Borbón (30 September 1974 – 1 March 2024) he married for the first time with Mónica Martín y Luque on 27 November 2004. They separated in 2011 and divorced in 2013. He married for a second time with Nadia Halamandari on 31 May 2016. From his second marriage he has one child, Nicolas (b. 5 June 2016). They separated in July 2017.

Her husband died of lymphatic cancer on 9 March 1991.

== Equestrian sport ==
Pilar de Borbón had been supporting international equestrian sport. She was President of the International Equestrian Federation from 1994 to 2006, succeeded by HRH Princess Haya bint al Hussein. She wrote the foreword of the official Spanish translation of the national instruction handbook of the German National Equestrian Federation, Técnicas Avanzadas de Equitación - Manual Oficial de Instrucción de la Federación Ecuestre Alemana.

From 1996 to 2006 she was a member of the International Olympic Committee for Spain, when she became an honorary member, and member of the executive board of the Spanish Olympic Committee.

== Philanthropic and other activities ==
Pilar de Borbón was one of the founders of Asociación Nuevo Futuro ("New Future Association") in 1968, an international child support organization, and was its president and then president of honor. Until her death, she was one of the leaders and supporters of the Rastrillo Nuevo Futuro event, which provided part of the income that financed Asociación. The event even received the visit of the Queens of Spain, Letizia and Sofia. Rastrillo has always been a place of meeting, solidarity and enjoyment for her, wrote ¡Hola! magazine in January 2019. Her last public appearance was in "Rastrillo" on 23 November 2019.

Pilar de Borbón was also a member of the board of directors of the Queen Sofía Spanish Institute in New York City, president of the World Monuments Fund España and, from 2007 to 2009, president of Europa Nostra, the European Federation for the Defense of Cultural Heritage. She was also a music fan and accompanied her brother, King Juan Carlos of Spain, and nephews to bullfighting matches.

== Financial holdings ==
Mossack Fonseca files document that in August 1974, Pilar de Borbón became president and director of the Panama-registered company Delantera Financiera SA (registered May 1969) with her husband as secretary-treasurer and director. In 1993, London-based Timothy Lloyd who had represented the undisclosed owner of the company said that Pilar de Borbón owned it. After March 1993, the intermediary representing the company was Madrid-based Gómez-Acebo & Pombo Abogados, a law firm founded by Pilar de Borbón's brother-in-law Ignacio Gómez-Acebo. From July 2006 until its dissolution in June 2014, five days before the installation of her nephew Felipe VI, Pilar de Borbón's son Bruno Alejandro Gómez-Acebo Borbón was director and treasurer of the company. On 7 April 2016 she admitted the accusations concerning the company were valid but made it clear that she never personally evaded taxes.

== Illness and death ==
Pilar was operated for an intestinal obstruction on 2 February 2019 in Madrid, and was diagnosed with colon cancer in 2019, being made public in May of the same year. On 5 January 2020, she was admitted to the hospital as her condition worsened. She died 3 days later on 8 January at the Ruber International Hospital in Madrid, with her family at her side.

She was cremated on 9 January and her ashes were buried alongside her husband in Saint Isidore Cemetery, Madrid, in a private ceremony. On 28 January, her funeral was held in El Escorial basilica, attended by her nephew King Felipe VI, former Queen of the Netherlands, Princess Beatrix, her brother Juan Carlos I and Queen Sofía, cousin-in-law by marriage Queen Margarita (wife of Simeon II of Bulgaria), the Duke of Braganza Duarte Pio, and Spanish political authorities represented by Deputy Prime Minister Carmen Calvo, Mayor of Madrid José Luis Martínez-Almeida and President of the Congress of Deputies Meritxell Batet.

== Titles, styles and honours ==
As daughter of the prince of Asturias, Pilar was born infanta of Spain with the style of Royal Highness. Later, her father granted her the title of Duchess of Badajoz, a title of the Royal House that cannot be inherited by her children.

=== Titles and styles ===
- 30 July 1936 – 13 April 1967: Her Royal Highness Infanta Doña Pilar
- 13 April 1967 – 8 January 2020: Her Royal Highness Infanta Doña Pilar, Duchess of Badajoz

=== Honours ===
==== National ====
- Spain: Knight Grand Cross of the Order of Charles III
- Spain: Dame Grand Cross of the Order of Queen Maria Luisa
- Spain: Knight Grand Cross of the Royal Order of Sports Merit

==== Foreign ====
- (Kingdom of Greece) Greek Royal Family: Dame Grand Cross of the Order of Saints Olga and Sophia
- (Kingdom of the Two Sicilies) Two Sicilian Royal Family (Hispano-Neapolitan branch): Dame Grand Cross of Justice of the Sacred Military Constantinian Order of Saint George
- Portugal: Grand Cross of the Order of Infante Henry

=== Arms ===
Coat of arms of Infanta Pilar, Duchess of Badajoz
Notes Coat of arms of the Duchess of Badajoz, depicting her husband's arms impaled with the royal arms of Spain. Crest The crown of Infantes of Spain Escutcheon Luis Gómez-Acebo arms impaled with the Royal Arms of Spain. Orders The Grand Cross of the Order of Charles III ribbon. And The Dame Grand Cross of Justice of the Sacred Military Constantinian Order of Saint George. Banner The Duchess of Badajoz's personal Royal Standard is that of the Spanish Monarch (a crimson square flag) with a swallow-tail and charged with her personalized coat of arms. Symbolism As with the Royal Arms of Spain. The first quarter are the arms of Castile, the second of León, the third of Aragon and the fourth of Navarre. Enté en point, the arms of Granada. Inescutcheon, the arms of Bourbon-Anjou.

Infanta Pilar House of Bourbon Born: 30 July 1936 Died: 8 January 2020
New creation	Duchess of Badajoz; 1967–2020	Extinct
