= Marquess of San Isidro =

Spanish nobility title

Marquessate of San Isidro
- Creation date: 14 January 1730
- Created by: Philip V
- Peerage: Peerage of Spain
- First holder: Pablo Rui-Gómez Lasso de la Vega y Balmaseda, 1st Marquess of San Isidro
- Last holder: Francisco Manuel Rui-Gómez, 5th Marquess of San Isidro
- Heir apparent: Fernando Ruigómez y Guerra
- Extinction date: 1925
- Motto: Veritas de terra orta est et iustitia de caelo prospexit (Truth is sprung out of the earth, and justice hath looked down from heaven)

Marquess of San Isidro (Spanish: Marqués de San Isidro) was a hereditary title in the Peerage of Spain, granted in 1730 by Philip V to Pablo Rui-Gómez, Viscount of Benafarces, knight of the Order of Santiago and perpetual regidor of León. The title was granted in recognition of his contribution to the restoration of the Basilica of San Isidoro in Leon, Spain.

The baroque palace of the Marquesses of San Isidro was, before a heavy fire in 1942, located at an emblematic spot where the Spanish troops first rebelled against Napoleon in León. There is also an avenue in the same city, named after the third Marquess of San Isidro, Santos Rui-Gómez, who perished in battle fighting for Spain's independence from the French in 1813.

As of 2010, the title is extinct, as more than 40 years have elapsed since the death of the last holder (1885).

== Viscounts of Benafarces (1729) ==
- Pablo Rui-Gómez Lasso de la Vega y Balmaseda, 1st Viscount of Benafarces (d. 1742)

== Marquesses of San Isidro (1730) ==
- Pablo Rui-Gómez Lasso de la Vega y Balmaseda, 1st Marquess of San Isidro (d. 1742)
- Juan Francisco Rui-Gómez y Bustamante, 2nd Marquess of San Isidro (1726-1787), only son of the 1st Marquess
- Santos Rui-Gómez y de Prado, 3rd Marquess of San Isidro (1750-1813), eldest son of the 2nd Marquess
- Francisco de Paula Rui-Gómez y de Prado, 4th Marquess of San Isidro (d. 1826), second son of the 2nd Marquess
- Francisco Manuel Rui-Gómez y Dañobeitia, 5th Marquess of San Isidro (1806-1885), only son of the 4th Marquess

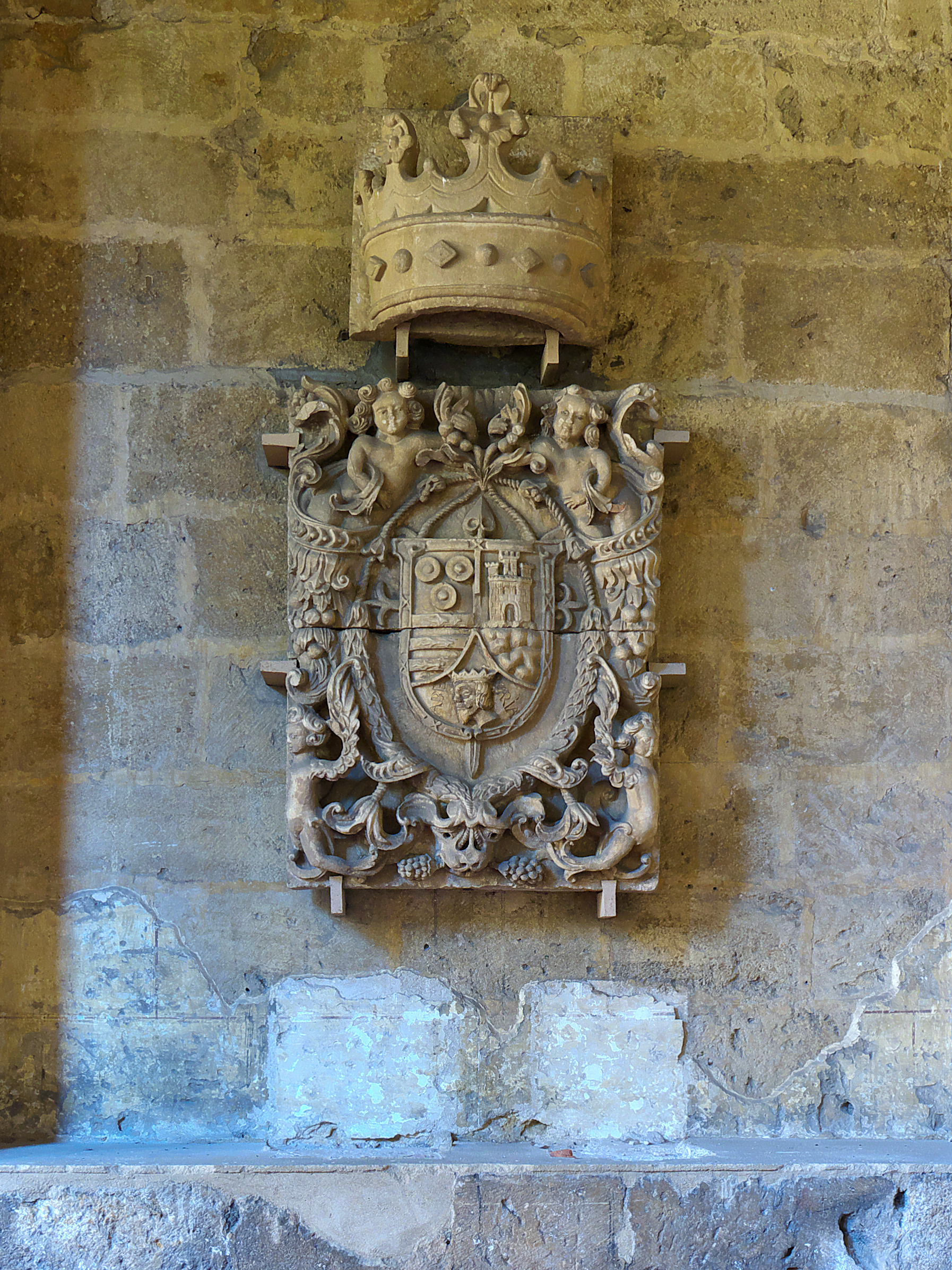
Coat of arms of the 1st Marquess of San Isidro in the cloisters of the Convent of San Marcos

== See also ==
- Basílica de San Isidoro, León
- Spanish nobility
