= Infante Juan, Count of Barcelona =

Spanish infante (1913–1993)

Infante Juan
- Count of Barcelona
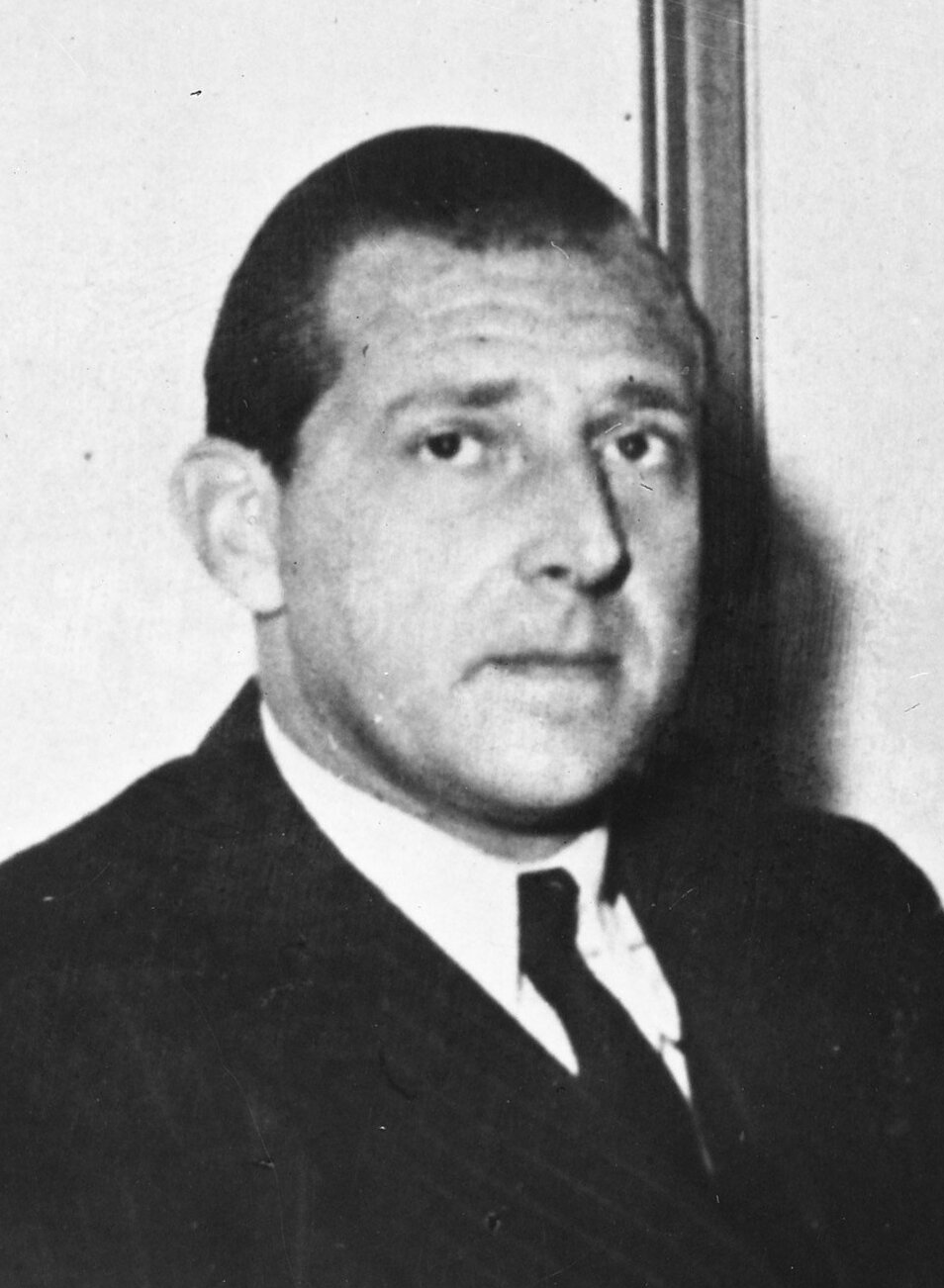
- Juan in 1946

Head of the Royal House of Spain
- Tenure: 15 January 1941 – 14 May 1977
- Predecessor: Alfonso XIII
- Successor: Juan Carlos I
- Born: 20 June 1913; Royal Palace of La Granja de San Ildefonso, San Ildefonso, Spain
- Died: 1 April 1993 (aged 79); Navarra University Hospital, Pamplona, Spain
- Burial: 7 April 1993; El Escorial, Community of Madrid, Spain
- Spouse: Princess María de las Mercedes of Bourbon-Two Sicilies (m. 1935)
- Issue: Infanta Pilar, Duchess of Badajoz; Juan Carlos I; Infanta Margarita, Duchess of Soria; Infante Alfonso
Names
- Juan Carlos Teresa Silverio Alfonso de Borbón y Battenberg
- House: Bourbon
- Father: Alfonso XIII
- Mother: Victoria Eugenie of Battenberg
- Religion: Roman Catholic
- Military career
- Allegiance: Spain
- Branch: Spanish Navy
- Rank: Captain general

Infante Juan, Count of Barcelona (Juan Carlos Teresa Silverio Alfonso de Borbón y Battenberg; 20 June 1913 – 1 April 1993), was a claimant to the Spanish throne as Juan III. He was the third son and designated heir of King Alfonso XIII and Victoria Eugenie of Battenberg. His father was replaced by the Second Spanish Republic in 1931. Juan's son Juan Carlos I became King of Spain when Spain's constitutional monarchy was restored in 1975.

== Early life ==
Infante Juan was born at the Palace of San Ildefonso. His father was forced into exile when the Second Spanish Republic was proclaimed on 14 April 1931. Owing to the renunciations in 1933 of his brothers Alfonso, Prince of Asturias, and Infante Jaime, Duke of Segovia, Infante Juan became first in line to the defunct Spanish throne. He thus received the title Prince of Asturias while serving with the Royal Navy in Bombay.

In March 1935, he was appointed honorary sub-lieutenant and passed naval exams in gunnery and navigation, which would have entitled him to a lieutenant’s commission in the Royal Navy if he gave up his Spanish nationality. This, however, he refused to do.

== Marriage ==
He met his future wife at a party hosted by Victor Emmanuel III of Italy on the day before his sister (Infanta Beatriz) was to be married. He married Princess María de las Mercedes of Bourbon-Two Sicilies (1910–2000), known in Spain as Doña María de las Mercedes de Borbón-Dos Sicilias y Orleans, in Rome on 12 October 1935.

=== Children ===
They had four children:

- Infanta Pilar, Duchess of Badajoz (30 July 1936 – 8 January 2020), who married Luis Gomez-Acebo y de Estrada, Viscount de la Torre, on 6 May 1967, and had five children
- Juan Carlos I of Spain (born 5 January 1938), who married Princess Sophia of Greece and Denmark on 14 May 1962, and had three children
- Infanta Margarita, Duchess of Soria and Duchess of Hernani (born 6 March 1939), who married Don Carlos Zurita y Delgado on 12 October 1972, and had two children
- Infante Alfonso of Spain (3 October 1941 – 29 March 1956)

They lived in Cannes and Rome, and, with the outbreak of World War II, they moved to Lausanne to live with his mother, Victoria Eugenie. Afterwards, they resided at Estoril, on the Portuguese Riviera. Together with their children Pilar and Juan Carlos, they took part in the ship tour organized by Queen Frederica and her husband King Paul of Greece in 1954, which became known as the “Cruise of the Kings” and was attended by over 100 royals from all over Europe. On this trip, Juan Carlos met the hosts' 15-year-old daughter, Sofia, his future wife, for the first time.

== Claim to the Spanish throne ==
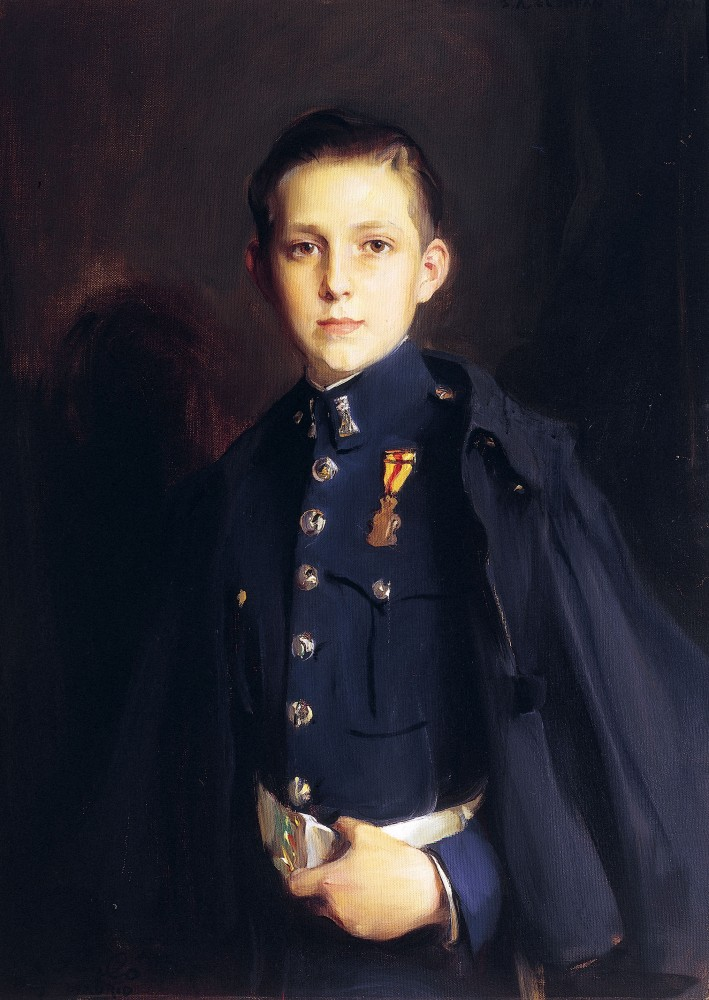
Portrait by Philip de László, 1927

In 1931, Juan was subject to dynastic negotiations between the Alfonsists and the Carlists, concluded in the so-called Pact of Territet, which was never implemented. Juan became heir apparent to the defunct Spanish throne after the renunciations of his two older brothers, Alfonso and Jaime, in 1933. To assert his claim to the throne, following his father's death (in 1941) he used the title of Count of Barcelona, a sovereign title associated with the Spanish crown.

In 1936, his father sent him to participate in the Spanish Civil War but he was arrested near the French border, and sent back by General Emilio Mola.

On 19 March 1945, he announced a manifesto in Lausanne, demanding he replace Francisco Franco:

Today, six years after the Civil War, the regime established by General Franco, inspired from the start by the totalitarian systems and the Axis powers, so contrary to the character and tradition of our people, is fundamentally incompatible with the circumstances, which the present war is creating in the world. The foreign policy followed by the regime is compromising the future of the nation. Spain runs the risk of being dragged into a new fratricidal conflict and of finding itself totally isolated from the world. The present regime, however hard it tries to adapt to the new situation, is responsible for this double danger. Moreover, a new republic, however moderate in its beginnings and its intentions, will not be long in shifting to one of the extremes, thus strengthening the other and finishing up in a new civil war. Only the traditional monarchy can be an instrument of peace and concord to reconcile Spaniards; it alone can obtain respect from abroad, by means of an effective state of law, and realize a harmonious synthesis of that order and freedom upon which is based the Christian concept of the state. Millions of Spaniards of the most varied ideologies are convinced of this truth and see in the monarchy the only saving institution.

When General Franco declared Spain a monarchy in 1947, he characterized it as a "restoration". However, Franco was afraid that Juan would roll back the Spanish State because he favoured constitutional monarchy, which would restore parliamentary democracy. As a result, in 1969, Franco passed over Juan in favour of Juan's son, Juan Carlos, whom Franco believed would be more likely to continue the dictatorship after his death. Juan Carlos later surprised many by his support of democratising Spain. Franco and Juan did not have a good relationship, with the latter constantly pressing Franco to restore the monarchy. Relations soured further when Juan called Franco an "illegitimate usurper".

Juan formally renounced his rights to the Spanish throne eight years after being displaced as recognised heir to the throne by Franco, and two years after his son, Juan Carlos, had become king. In return, his son officially granted him the title of Count of Barcelona, which he had claimed for so long.

After his death in 1993, he was buried with honours due a king, under the name Juan III (his title if he had become king) in the Royal Crypt of the monastery of San Lorenzo de El Escorial, near Madrid. His wife survived him by seven years.

He was fond of the sea, and joined the Naval School at San Fernando, Cádiz, and had tattoos of a marine theme from his time in the British Royal Navy. He was appointed an honorary admiral of the Royal Navy on 31 July 1987.

== Honours and arms ==
=== Honours ===
- (Restoration (Spain)) Spain :
  - Knight of the Golden Fleece, 16 May 1927
  - Grand Cross of Naval Merit, with White Decoration, 17 July 1978
  - Grand Cross of Military Merit, with White Decoration, 5 February 1993
  - Grand Cross of Aeronautical Merit, with White Decoration, 5 February 1993
- (Greece) Greek Royal Family:
  - Grand Cross of the Redeemer, 13 May 1962
  - Grand Cross of Saints George and Constantine, 13 May 1962
- Portugal:
  - (Kingdom of Portugal) Portuguese Royal Family: Grand Cross of the Immaculate Conception of Vila Viçosa, 8 December 1983
  - Portuguese Republic: Grand Cross of the Order of Christ, 31 January 1986
- (Kingdom of Italy) Italian Royal Family:
  - Knight of the Annunciation, 24 November 1946
  - Grand Cross of Saints Maurice and Lazarus, 24 November 1946
  - Grand Cross of the Crown of Italy, 24 November 1946
  - (Kingdom of the Two Sicilies) Two Sicilian Royal Family: Grand Cross of the Constantinian Order of St. George, 12 March 1960
- Monaco: Grand Cross of the Order of Saint-Charles, 11 May 1962

=== Arms ===
Heraldry of Infante Juan of Spain, Count of Barcelona

Arms as Infante of Spain
(1927–1931/1933)

Royal Coat of Arms of Spain
Version of 1924/1931
Used as Pretender and Head of the Royal House.
(1941–1977)

Lesser Royal Coat of Arms of Spain
Also used by Don Juan as Pretender.
(1941–1977)

Arms after the renunciation of the Throne
(1977–1993)

Infante Juan, Count of Barcelona House of Bourbon Cadet branch of the House of Capet Born: 20 June 1913 Died: 1 April 1993
Spanish nobility
Preceded by Alfonso XIII	Count of Barcelona; 8 March 1941 – 1 April 1993	Succeeded by Juan Carlos I
Titles in pretence
Preceded by Alfonso XIII	— TITULAR — King of Spain; 15 January 1941 – 14 May 1977; Reason for succession failure: Republic proclaimed in 1931	Succeeded by Juan Carlos I
