= Francisco Manuel Rui-Gómez, 5th Marquess of San Isidro =

Spanish nobleman, politician

The Most Illustrious The Marquess of San Isidro OM
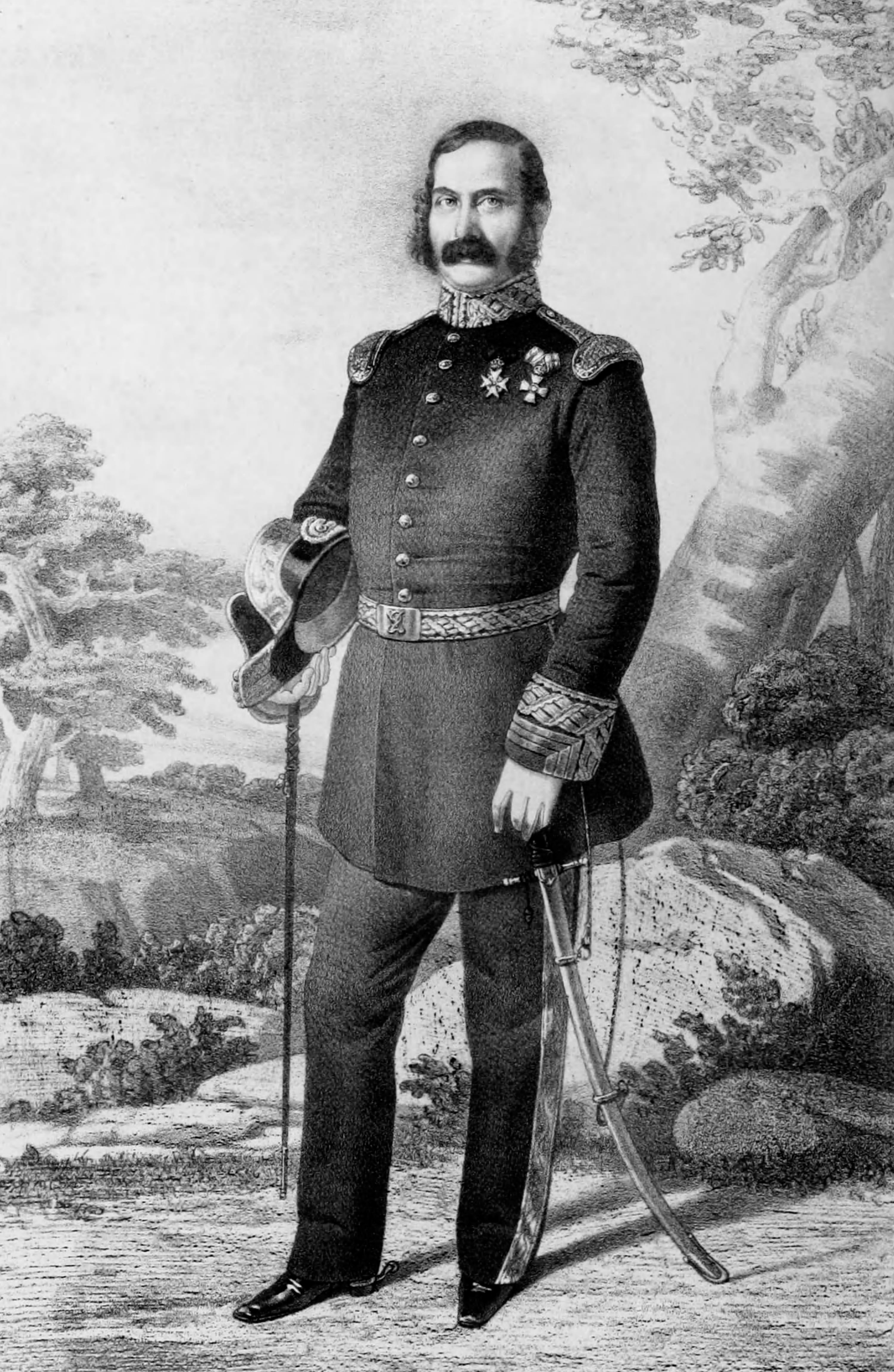
- Lithography of the Marquess of San Isidro, 1858

Senator for life
- In office 1864–1885
- Monarchs: Isabella II; Amadeo I

Senator for León
- In office 1876–1878
- Monarch: Alfonso XII
- President: Antonio Cánovas del Castillo

Personal details
- Born: Francisco Manuel María Wenceslao Rui-Gómez y Domínguez; 28 September 1804 A Coruña, Kingdom of Spain
- Died: 5 August 1885 (aged 80) Durango, Kingdom of Spain

Francisco Manuel Rui-Gómez y Domínguez 5th Marquess of San Isidro, OM (28 September 1804 – 5 August 1885) was a Spanish peer, army officer, politician and intellectual who fought for the Liberals in the Carlist Wars and later served as Senator for the Province of León as well as Senator for life in 1864.

== Early life ==
Born Francisco Manuel María Wenceslao in A Coruña, into one of the most influential noble houses of León. His father, Francisco de Paula Rui-Gómez y de la Quintana, 4th Marquess of San Isidro, was posted there as field marshal of the Royal Spanish Armies at the time he was born. His ancestor, Pablo Rui-Gómez Lasso de la Vega y Balmaseda, had been granted the title of Marquess of San Isidro in 1730 by the king Philip V, in recognition to his patronage of the Basílica of San Isidoro in León.

== Marriage and issue ==
Rui-Gómez married María del Carmen de Riobóo y Roldán, Countess of Taboada (d. 1839). They had one child:

- Nicolás María Rui-Gómez y Riobóo (1830–1869), married to his first cousin, Francisca de Riobóo y Álvarez (1837–1918)

== Heraldry ==
Heraldry of Francisco Manuel Rui-Gómez, 5th Marquess of San Isidro

Coat of Arms of Francisco Manuel Rui-Gómez as Marquess of San Isidro (1847-1885)

== See also ==
- Marquess of San Isidro
- Carlist Wars
