= Countess of Dreux =

French consort of the Count of Dreux

This article is of the Countesses of Dreux; the consorts of the French counts of Dreux.

== Countess of Dreux ==
=== House of Dreux ===
Picture	Name	Father	Birth	Marriage	Became Countess	Ceased to be Countess	Death	Spouse
	Agnes de Garlande	Anseau de Garlande, Count of Rochefort (Garlande)	1122	1139/41		1143		Robert I
	Hawise of Salisbury	Walter Fitz Edward of Salisbury, Sheriff of Wiltshire (Fitz Edward)	1118	1144/45		13 January 1152		Robert I
	Agnes de Baudemont, Countess of Braine	Guy de Baudement, Count of Braine (Baudement)	1130	1152		1184; County granted to their son	24 July 1204	Robert I
	Yolande de Coucy	Ralph I, Sire of Coucy (Coucy)	1164	1184		28 December 1218 husband's death	18 March 1222	Robert II
	Aénor, Lady of Saint-Valery	Thomas, Sire of Saint-Valery (Saint-Valery)	1192	1210	28 December 1218 husband's accession	3 March 1234 husband's death	15 November 1250	Robert III
	Marie de Bourbon-Dampierre	Archambaud VIII de Dampierre, Sire of Bourbon (Dampierre)	1220	April 1240		1249 husband's death	24 August 1274	John I
	Beatrice, Countess of Montfort	John I, Count of Montfort (Montfort)	December 1248/1249	1260		12 November 1282 husband's death	9 March 1312	Robert IV
	Jeanne de Beaujeu, Lady of Montpensier	Humbert II de Beaujeu, Sire of Montpensier (Beaujeu)	?	1292		January 1308		John II
	Perrenelle of Sully	Henri III, Sire of Sully (Sully)	?	January 1308		1309 husband's death	after 9 January 1338	John II
	Marie de Enghien	Walter II, Sire of Enghien (Enghien)	-	April 1321		22 March 1329 husband's death	after October 1378	Robert V
	Ida de Rosny	Guy II, Sire of Rosny (Rosny)	?	1329		1331 husband's death	1375	John III
	Isabeau de Melun, Lady of Houdain	Jean I, Viscount of Melun and Count of Tancarville (Melun)	1328	1341/43		3 November 1345 husband's death	20 December 1389	Peter I
Picture	Name	Father	Birth	Marriage	Became Countess	Ceased to be Countess	Death	Spouse

=== House of Thouars ===
Picture	Name	Father	Birth	Marriage	Became Countess	Ceased to be Countess	Death	Spouse
	Joan of Artois	John of Artois, Count of Eu (Artois)	1353	12 July 1365		1365 husband's death	1420	Simon
Picture	Name	Father	Birth	Marriage	Became Countess	Ceased to be Countess	Death	Spouse

=== House of Albret ===
Picture	Name	Father	Birth	Marriage	Became Countess	Ceased to be Countess	Death	Spouse
	Margaret of Bourbon	Peter I, Duke of Bourbon (Bourbon)	1344	30 June 1368	1382 husband's accession	1401 husband's death	after 4 January 1416	Arnaud Amanieu
Picture	Name	Father	Birth	Marriage	Became Countess	Ceased to be Countess	Death	Spouse

=== House of Valois-Orléans ===
Picture	Name	Father	Birth	Marriage	Became Countess	Ceased to be Countess	Death	Spouse
	Valentina Visconti	Giangaleazzo Visconti, Duke of Milan (Visconti)	1366	17 August 1389	1407 husband's accession	23 November 1407 husband's death	4 December 1408	Louis I
Picture	Name	Father	Birth	Marriage	Became Countess	Ceased to be Countess	Death	Spouse

=== House of Albret ===
Picture	Name	Father	Birth	Marriage	Became Countess	Ceased to be Countess	Death	Spouse
	Marie, Lady of Sully	Louis, Sire of Sully (Sully)	-	27 January 1400	1408 husband's accession	25 October 1415 husband's death	-	Charles I
	Anne of Armagnac	Bernard VII, Count of Armagnac (Armagnac)	1402	23 April 1418		1471 husband's death	before March 1473	Charles II
	Catherine of Rohan	Alain IX, Viscount of Rohan and Leon (Rohan)	1402	before 20 September 1447		1468 husband's death	after 24 March 1471	John IV
	Françoise de Blois-Châtillon, Countess of Périgord	Guillaume de Blois-Châtillon (Blois-Châtillon)	?	1456/70	1471 husband's accession	1481		Alain I
	Catherine I of Navarre	Gaston of Foix, Prince of Viana (Foix)	1468	14 July 1484		14 June 1516 husband's death	12 February 1518	John V
	Marguerite de Navarre	Charles, Count of Angoulême (Valois-Angoulême)	11 April 1492	24 January 1527		21 December 1549		Henry II
Picture	Name	Father	Birth	Marriage	Became Countess	Ceased to be Countess	Death	Spouse

=== House of Valois ===
None

=== House of Bourbon-Soissons ===
Picture	Name	Father	Birth	Marriage	Became Countess	Ceased to be Countess	Death	Spouse
	Anne de Montafié, Countess of Montafié	Louis de Montafié, Count of Montafié (Montafié)	22 July 1577	27 December 1601		1 November 1612 husband's death	17 June 1644	Charles de Soissons
Picture	Name	Father	Birth	Marriage	Became Countess	Ceased to be Countess	Death	Spouse

=== House of Savoy-Carignan-Soissons ===
Picture	Name	Father	Birth	Marriage	Became Countess	Ceased to be Countess	Death	Spouse
	Olympia Mancini	Baron Michele Lorenzo Mancini (Mancini)	11 July 1637	21 February 1657		6 June 1673 husband's death	9 October 1708	Eugène-Maurice de Savoie-Carignan
Picture	Name	Father	Birth	Marriage	Became Countess	Ceased to be Countess	Death	Spouse

=== House of Orléans-Longueville ===
None

=== House of Bourbon-Vendôme ===
Picture	Name	Father	Birth	Marriage	Became Countess	Ceased to be Countess	Death	Spouse
	Marie Anne de Bourbon	Henri Jules, Prince of Condé (Bourbon-Condé)	24 February 1678	21 May 1710		11 June 1712 husband's death	11 April 1718	Louis Joseph de Bourbon
Picture	Name	Father	Birth	Marriage	Became Countess	Ceased to be Countess	Death	Spouse

=== House of Bourbon-Condé ===
None

=== House of Palatinate-Simmern ===
None

=== House of Bourbon-Condé ===
None

=== House of Bourbon-Maine ===
None

=== House of Bourbon-Penthièvre ===
Picture	Name	Father	Birth	Marriage	Became Countess	Ceased to be Countess	Death	Spouse
	Maria Teresa d'Este	Francesco III d'Este, Duke of Modena (Este)	6 October 1726	29 December 1744	13 July 1775 husband's accession	30 April 1754		Louis Jean Marie de Penthièvre
Picture	Name	Father	Birth	Marriage	Became Countess	Ceased to be Countess	Death	Spouse

=== House of Orléans ===
Sole surviving heiress of her father and of the properties of the house of Bourbon du Maine, Louise Marie Adélaïde de Bourbon (died 1821) added the château and domain of Dreux to the possessions of the house of Orléans by her marriage with Philippe Égalité. She was the mother of the future king Louis Philippe. The domain is now property of the Fondation Saint-Louis.
