= Counts of Dreux =

Noble family of France

Coat of arms of the Counts of Dreux.

The Counts of Dreux were a noble family of France, who took their title from the chief stronghold of their domain, the château of Dreux, which lies near the boundary between Normandy and the Île-de-France. They are notable for inheriting the Duchy of Brittany through Pierre de Dreux's marriage to Alix de Thouars in the early 13th century.

== History ==
In the tenth century the lands belonged to the forebears of the Capetians; they passed by marriage to Walter, Count of the Vexin, then to Richard I of Normandy. In 1017 the lands were given as dowry to Richard's illegitimate daughter Matilda, who married Odo II, Count of Blois.

King Robert II of France confiscated the lands of Dreux from Odo, and they formed part of the royal domain until Louis the Fat granted the county of Dreux as an appanage to his son Robert. The descendants of Robert held the county of Dreux until 1355, when the heiress, Countess Joan II of Dreux, married Simon de Thouars. Simon and Joan had three daughters and no sons; their daughters sold their interests in the county of Dreux to King Charles VI.

King Charles gave the county of Dreux as a dowry in the marriage of his kinswoman Marguerite de Bourbon, daughter of Peter, Duke of Bourbon and of Isabella de Valois, daughter of Charles of Valois, with Arnaud-Amanieu d'Albret in 1382. The county returned to the crown in 1556, and thereafter formed part of the royal domain, then the lands of François, Duke of Anjou, and after his death was sold to the Duke of Nemours. It returned to the royal domain in the reign of Louis XV.

== List of counts of Dreux ==
=== Capetian House of Dreux ===
Name	Portrait	Birth	Marriage(s)	Death
Robert I the Great; 1137–1184		c. 1123 fifth son of Louis VI of France and Adélaide of Maurienne	(1) Agnes of Garlande (1122–1143), daughter of Anseau de Garlande, Count of Rochefort; married 1139/41, one son (2) Hawise of Salisbury (1118 – 13 Jan 1152), daughter of Walter Fitz Edward of Salisbury, Sheriff of Wiltshire; married 1144/45, one daughter (3) Agnes of Baudemont (1130 – 24 July 1204), daughter of Guy de Baudement, Count of Braine; married 1152, ten children	11 October 1188; Braine aged 64–65
Robert II; 1184–1218		c. 1154 eldest son of Robert and Agnes of Baudemont	(1) Matilda of Burgundy; 1178 no issue (2) Yolande of Coucy; 1184 twelve children	28 December 1218; Braine aged 63–64
Robert III Gasteblé; 1218–1234		c. 1185 eldest son of Robert II and Yolande of Coucy	Aénor of Saint-Valery; 1210 four children	3 March 1234; Braine aged 48–49
John I 1234–1249		c. 1215 eldest son of Robert III and Aénor of Saint-Valery	Marie of Bourbon-Dampierre; April 1240 three children	c. 1249; Nicosia aged 33–34
Robert IV; 1249–1282		c. 1241 eldest son of John I and Marie of Bourbon-Dampierre	Beatrice of Montfort; 1260 six children	12 November 1282; Braine aged 40–41
John II the Good; 1282–1309		c. 1265 eldest son of Robert IV and Beatrice of Montfort	(1) Joan of Montpensier; 1292 five children (2) Perrenelle of Sully; January 1308 one daughter	c. 1309; Braine aged 43–44
Robert V 1309–1329		c. 1293 eldest son of John II and Joan of Montpensier	Marie of Enghien; April 1321 no issues	22 March 1329; Braine aged 35–36
John III; 1329–1331		c. 1295 second son of John II and Joan of Montpensier	Ida of Rosny; 1329 no issues	c. 1331; Braine aged 35–36
Peter I 1331–1345		c. 1298 third son of John II and Joan of Montpensier	Isabeau de Melun; 1341 one daughter	3 November 1345; Braine aged 46–47
Joan I 1345–1346 under the regency of Countess Isabeau		c. 1345; Chateau de Gamaches only daughter of Peter I and Isabeau de Melun	never married	c. 1346; Braine aged 1
Joan II; 1346–1355 with Louis I		c. 1309 only daughter of John II and Perrenelle of Sully	Louis I of Thouars; Thouars; 1330 five children	c. 1355 aged 45–46
Louis I 1346–1355 with Joan II		c. 1310; Thouars eldest son of John I of Thouars and Blanche of Brabant	(1) Joan II of Dreux; Thouars; 1330 five children (2) Isabeau d'Avaugour; Thouars; July 1361 no issues	7 April 1370; Talmont aged 59–60

=== House of Thouars ===
- 1355-1365 : Simon (son of)
- 1365-1377 : Péronelle (sister of)
- 1365-1377 : Isabeau (sister of)
- 1365-1377 : Margaret (sister of)

In 1377, the three sisters sold Dreux to the French crown.

=== House of Albret ===
- 1382-1401 : Arnaud Amanieu (also lord of Albret)
- 1401-1415 : Charles I (son of, also lord of Albret)
- 1415-1471 : Charles II (son of, also lord of Albret)
  - John IV (associated, also viscount of Tartas)
- 1471-1522 : Alain - Alain the Great (son of)
  - John V (associated)
- 1522-1555 : Henry I (son of, also king of Navarre)
- 1555-1572 : Jeanne (daughter of, also queen of Navarre)

=== House of Valois-Angoulême ===
Name	Portrait	Birth	Marriage(s)	Death
Catherine; 1559–1569		13 April 1519; Florence only daughter of Lorenzo II de' Medici, Duke of Urbino and Madeleine de La Tour d'Auvergne	Henry II of France; Marseille; 28 October 1533 ten children	5 January 1589; Château de Blois aged 69
Hercule-François; 1569–1584 duc de Dreux		18 March 1555; Château de Fontainebleau fifth son of Henry II of France and Catherine	never married	19 June 1584; Château-Thierry aged 29

=== House of Bourbon ===
Name	Portrait	Birth	Marriage(s)	Death
Charles III; 1594–1612		3 November 1566; Nogent-le-Rotrou sixth son of Louis I de Bourbon, prince de Condé and Françoise d'Orléans-Longueville	Anne de Montafié; 27 December 1601 five children	1 November 1612; Château de Blandy aged 45
Louis III; 1612–1641		1 May 1604; Hôtel de Soissons only son of Charles III and Anne de Montafié	never married	6 July 1641; Sedan aged 36
Marie; 1641–1656		3 March 1606; Hôtel de Soissons second daughter of Charles III and Anne de Montafié	Thomas Francis, Prince of Carignano; Paris; 6 January 1625 seven children	3 June 1692; Hôtel de Soissons aged 86

=== House of Savoy-Carignano ===
Name	Portrait	Birth	Marriage(s)	Death
Eugene Maurice, Count of Soissons; 1656–1673		2 May 1635 Chambéry, Savoie, Rhone-Alpes, France	Olympia Mancini; Paris; 21 February 1657 eight children	6 June 1673; Unna aged 38
Emmanuel Philibert of Carignano; 1673–1676		16 October 1662 fourth son of Eugene Maurice and Olympia Mancini	never married	12 June 1676; Turin aged 13

=== House of Longueville ===
Name	Portrait	Birth	Marriage(s)	Death
Marie; 1676–1707		5 March 1625; Paris eldest daughter of Henri II d'Orléans, duc de Longueville and Louise de Bourbon	Henri II, Duke of Nemours; Trie; 22 May 1657 no issues	16 June 1707; Paris aged 82

=== House of Bourbon ===
Name	Portrait	Birth	Marriage(s)	Death
Louis Joseph; 1707–1712		1 July 1654; Paris eldest son of Louis de Bourbon, Duke of Vendôme and Laura Mancini	Marie Anne de Bourbon; Chateau de Sceaux; 21 May 1710 no issues	11 June 1712; Vinaros aged 57
Marie Anne; 1712–1718		24 February 1678; Hôtel de Condé fifth daughter of Henri Jules de Bourbon, prince de Condé and Anne Henriette	Louis Joseph de Bourbon, Duke of Vendôme; Chateau de Sceaux; 21 May 1710 no issues	11 April 1718; Hôtel de Vendôme aged 40

=== House of Palatinate-Simmern ===
Name	Portrait	Birth	Marriage(s)	Death
Anne Henriette; 1718–1723		13 March 1648; Paris second daughter of Edward of the Palatinate-Simmern and Anna Gonzaga	Henri Jules de Bourbon, prince de Condé; Chateau de Sceaux; 11 December 1663 ten children	23 February 1723; Petit Luxembourg aged 74

=== House of Bourbon ===
Name	Portrait	Birth	Marriage(s)	Death
Anne Louise Bénédicte; 1723–1753		8 November 1676; Hôtel de Condé fourth daughter of Henri Jules de Bourbon, prince de Condé and Anne Henriette	Louis-Auguste de Bourbon, duc du Maine; Palace of Versailles; 19 May 1692 seven children	23 January 1753; Hôtel du Maine aged 76
Louis Auguste; 1753–1755		4 March 1700; Palace of Versailles second son of Louis-Auguste de Bourbon, duc du Maine and Anne Louise Bénédicte	never married	1 October 1755; Palace of Fontainebleau aged 55
Louis Charles; 1755–1775		5 October 1701; Château de Sceaux third son of Louis-Auguste de Bourbon, duc du Maine and Anne Louise Bénédicte	never married	13 July 1775; Château de Sceaux aged 73
Louis Jean Marie; 1775–1793		16 November 1725; Château de Rambouillet only son of Louis-Alexandre de Bourbon, comte de Toulouse and Marie Victoire de Noailles	Maria Teresa d'Este; Palace of Versailles; 29 December 1744 seven children	4 March 1793; Château de Bizy aged 67
