= Louis I of Thouars =

French nobleman (1310–1370)

Louis I, Viscount of Thouars
- Born: c. 1310
- Died: 7 April 1370; Talmont, France
- Noble family: House of Thouars
- Spouse: Joan II, Countess of Dreux
- Issue: Péronelle; Simon, Count of Dreux; Isabeau; Margaret
- Father: Jean I of Thouars
- Mother: Blanche of Brabant

Louis I (c. 1310 – 7 April 1370) was Viscount of Thouars from 1333 to 1370 and Count of Dreux jure uxoris from 1345 to 1355. He was also lord of Talmont and Mauléon. Louis was the son of Jean I, Viscount of Thouars, and Blanche of Brabant.

== Life ==
He succeeded his uncle, Hugh II, as viscount of Thouars in 1333. Louis was an ally of Philip VI of France throughout his reign and served in the French army against Edward III of England as a banner-man from 1338 until 1341 in the first stage of the Hundred Years' War. Later, he fought on the side of King John the Good at the Battle of Poitiers on 19 September 1356. In the Treaty of Brétigny (8 May 1360), Thouars fell under English control and the Englishman John Chandos took possession of the town on 3 November 1361. The viscount's wife, Joan, made an oath of fidelity to the king of England in 1363.

Louis died at Talmond on 7 April 1370. His son, Simon, had succeeded to the County of Dreux upon the death of Joan in 1355, but Simon's death in 1365 meant that his eldest daughter, Péronelle, Countess of Dreux, inherited Thouars after his death.

== Marriages and Children ==
In 1330, Louis married as his first wife Joan, daughter of John II, Count of Dreux, and Péronnelle de Sully. They had two sons and three daughters:

- Simon, Count of Dreux (d. 12 July 1365 at a tournament on the day of his marriage. Buried in the chapel of Eu), who married Joan of Artois (1353 – 1420)
- Jean, lord of La Chaize-le-Vicomte and of Mortagne (d. June 1355)
- Péronelle, who married Amaury IV de Craon, and then Clément Rouault
- Isabeau, who married Guy de Nesle, then Ingelger d'Amboise, and finally Guillaume d'Harcourt
- Margaret, who married Thomas, lord of Chemillé and Mortagne, and then Turpin, lord of Crissay in Touraine

In July 1361, he married Isabeau d'Avaugour, daughter of Henry IV d'Auvaugour and Jeanne d'Harcourt, widow of Geoffroy VIII de Chateaubriand (1314–1347), without further progeny.

== Sources ==
- du Chesne Tourangeau, André (1631). Histoire Genealogique de la Maison Royale de Dreux et de Quelques Autres Familles (in French). Paris: Chez Sebastien Cramoisy.
- Imbert, Hugues (1871). Histoire de Thouars (in French). Niort: L. Clouzot, Libraire-Éditeur.

Louis I of Thouars House of Thouars Born: 1310 Died: 7 April 1370
Preceded by Hugh II	Viscount of Thouars; 1333–1270	Succeeded by Péronnelle
