= List of consorts of Étampes =

== Countess of Étampes ==
=== House of Évreux, 1327–1381 ===
| Picture | Name | Father | Birth | Marriage | Became Countess | Ceased to be Countess | Death | Spouse |
|---|---|---|---|---|---|---|---|---|
| | Maria de La Cerda y Lara, Lady of Lunel | Infante Ferdinand de la Cerda (de la Cerda) | 1319 | April 1335 | | 5 September 1336 husband's death | 13 March 1375 | Charles |
| | Jeanne of Brienne | Raoul I of Brienne, Count of Eu (Brienne) | – | 16 January 1358 | | 1381 husband relinquish title | 6 July 1389 | Louis |

=== House of Valois-Anjou, 1381–1384 ===
| Picture | Name | Father | Birth | Marriage | Became Countess | Ceased to be Countess | Death | Spouse |
|---|---|---|---|---|---|---|---|---|
| | Marie of Blois-Châtillon | Charles of Blois-Châtillon, Duke of Brittany (Châtillon) | 1343/5 | 9 July 1360 | 1381 husband's accession | 20 September 1384 husband's death | 12 November 1404 | Louis I |

- vacant

=== House of Valois-Berry, 1399–1416 ===
| Picture | Name | Father | Birth | Marriage | Became Countess | Ceased to be Countess | Death | Spouse |
|---|---|---|---|---|---|---|---|---|
| | Joan of Armagnac | John I, Count of Armagnac (Armagnac) | 24 June 1346 | 24 June 1360 | | March 1387 | | John I |
| | Joan II, Countess of Auvergne | John II, Count of Auvergne (Auvergne) | 1378 | 5 June 1390 | | 15 March 1416 husband's death | shortly before 6 February 1423 | John I |

- vacant, to royal domain

=== House of Montfort, 1421–1478 ===
| Picture | Name | Father | Birth | Marriage | Became Countess | Ceased to be Countess | Death | Spouse |
|---|---|---|---|---|---|---|---|---|
| | Marguerite, Countess of Vertus | Louis I, Duke of Orléans (Valois-Orléans) | 1406 | 7 July 1448 | | 2 June 1438 husband's death | 24 April 1466 | Richard of Montfort |
| | Margaret of Brittany | Francis I, Duke of Brittany (Montfort) | 1443 | 16 November 1455 | | 25 September 1469 | | Francis II of Brittany |
| | Margaret of Foix | Gaston IV, Count of Foix (Foix) | 1453 | 27 June 1471/4 | | 1478 ? | 15 May 1486 | Francis II of Brittany |

- disputed with the Countess of Nevers and Duchess of Burgundy

=== House of Foix, 1478–1512 ===
| Picture | Name | Father | Birth | Marriage | Became Countess | Ceased to be Countess | Death | Spouse |
|---|---|---|---|---|---|---|---|---|
| | Marie of Orléans | Charles I, Duke of Orléans (Valois-Orléans) | 19 December/September 1457 | 1476 | 1478 husband's accession | 1493 | | John of Foix |

== Duchess of Étampes ==
=== House of Brosse ===
| Picture | Name | Father | Birth | Marriage | Became Duchess | Ceased to be Duchess | Death | Spouse |
|---|---|---|---|---|---|---|---|---|
| | Anne de Pisseleu d'Heilly | Adrien de Pisseleu, seigneur d'Heilly | 1508 | 1533 | 1536 created Duchess | 1553 husband's desposition | 1580 | Jean IV de Brosse |

=== House of Poitiers ===
- None

=== House of Brosse ===
| Picture | Name | Father | Birth | Marriage | Became Duchess | Ceased to be Duchess | Death | Spouse |
|---|---|---|---|---|---|---|---|---|
| | Anne de Pisseleu d'Heilly | Adrien de Pisseleu, seigneur d'Heilly | 1508 | 1533 | 1562 husband regains duchy | 27 January 1564 husband's death | 1580 | Jean IV de Brosse |

- to royal domain

=== House of Palatinate-Simmern ===
| Picture | Name | Father | Birth | Marriage | Became Duchess | Ceased to be Duchess | Death | Spouse |
|---|---|---|---|---|---|---|---|---|
| Translation | Elisabeth of Saxony | Augustus, Elector of Saxony (Wettin) | 18 October 1552 | 4 June 1570 | 1576 husband's accession | 1577 husband lost title | 2 April 1590 | John Casimir of the Palatinate-Simmern |

- to royal domain

=== House of Guise ===
- None

=== House of Valois-Angoulême ===
- None

=== House of Bourbon-Vendôme ===
| Picture | Name | Father | Birth | Marriage | Became Duchess | Ceased to be Duchess | Death | Spouse |
|---|---|---|---|---|---|---|---|---|
| | Françoise de Lorraine | Philippe Emmanuel, Duke of Mercoeur (Lorraine) | November 1592 | 16 July 1609 | | 22 October 1665 husband's death | 8 September 1669 | César |
| | Marie Anne de Bourbon | Henri Jules, Prince of Condé (Bourbon) | 24 February 1678 | 21 May 1710 | | 11 June 1712 husband's death | 11 April 1718 | Louis Joseph |

=== House of Orléans ===
| Picture | Name | Father | Birth | Marriage | Became Duchess | Ceased to be Duchess | Death | Spouse |
|---|---|---|---|---|---|---|---|---|
| | Louise Marie Adélaïde de Bourbon; Mademoiselle de Penthièvre | Louis Jean Marie de Bourbon, Duke of Penthièvre (Bourbon) | 13 March 1753 | 8 May 1768 | 18 November 1785 husband's accession | 6 November 1793 husband's execution | 23 June 1821 | Louis Philippe Joseph d'Orléans |

- The title has not been reused in the d'Orléans family

== See also ==
- Countess of Évreux
- Duchess of Penthièvre
- Duchess of Vendôme
- List of consorts of Nevers
- List of consorts of Burgundy
