= List of viscounts of Thouars =

The first viscounts of Thouars appeared at the end of the 9th century, somewhat earlier than those of Châtellerault, Lusignan, etc. They represented the count of Poitou (also the duke of Aquitaine) in the territory he had enfeoffed to them. The family of the viscounts of Thouars doubtless originated in the surroundings of Poitiers where they held lands in the 10th century. At this era, they were patrons of the abbeys at Saint-Cyprien de Poitiers, Saint-Jouin de Marnes (15 km to the south of Thouars), Saint-Florent de Saumur and Saint-Martin de Tours. In the 11th century, following Geoffrey II of Thouars's marriage to Agnes of Blois, they added to this list the abbeys of Bourgueil and Marmoutier.

== List ==
=== House of Thouars ===
The coat of arms of the Thouars family is derived from that of Herbert II (blazon or, the franc-quartier gules, semee of fleurs-de-lis azure); the city of Thouars adopted the same coat of arms but with the tinctures reversed, viz. azure, semee of fleurs-de-lis or.

Before 876–903: Geoffroy I. His successors Savary and Aimery are likely his sons or his nephews.

903-929: Savary I. A follower of the Count of Poitou Ebles Manzer. He participated in meetings held by the Count of Poitiers. In 903 Ebles rewarded him by giving him the authority of the Abbey of Saint Maixent.

929-936: Aimery I. Brother of Savary I, he owned property near Poitiers and was admitted to the Abbey of Saint Maixent (which was very rich). He married Aremburge, and they had two sons, Savary II and Aimery II.

936-943: Savary II. Son of Aimery I; he had no sons.

943-960: Aimery II. Son of Aimery I. He was a faithful ally of his suzerain Geoffroy Grisegonnelle, Count of Anjou, who awarded him the goods Chavagne near the monastery of Saint Maixent to Faye near the Abbess and Bressuire Miss south of Thouars. In 955 he donated land, the Abbess Faye always to the benefit of the Abbey Saint Bonneval lès Thouars. Aimery II married Eleanor by 935, with whom he had a son, Herbert I.

Abt 960–987: Herbert I. Son of Aimery II. Geoffroy Grisegonnelle, Count of Anjou, appears as suzerain and protector of Viscount Herbert (it will be the same, however, vis-à-vis his son Aimery III). About 973, Geoffroy was in possession of the strengths of Loudun and Mirebeau and then encircled the area of the Vicomte of Thouars. Herbert married in 956 Aldéarde (or Hildegarde), daughter Cadelon I, Viscount of Aunay (Aulnay, Charente-Maritime) and Sénégonde.

Herbert and Aldéarde had several children: Aimery III, Savary III, Raoul I, Thibault and Geoffroy. Aldéarde was famous for a mishap which happened around the year 980. Having had an affair with the Count of Poitiers William IV of Poitiers, it was exposed to the vengeance of the latter's wife, Emma de Blois. Emma took revenge by bullying her rival during a meeting. Emma took refuge in the castle of Chinon, where she waited for her husband to forgive this action.

987-997: Aimery III. Son of Herbert I and Aldéarde (or Hildegarde) Aunay. He was a firm vassal of the Count Poitiers, but he was also a vassal of the Count of Anjou Fulk III Nerra, who was very present in this part of Poitou. Viscount Thouars assisted in 992 Fulk against the Britons for the possession of the County of Nantes and especially during the Battle of Conquereuil. Fulk awarded custody of Nantes Aimery during the minority of small Comte Judicaël. In 994, however, Aimery away lasting alliance Angevine and Fulk built a fortress at Passavant to control it. He married Elvis, but they had no children together, however Aimery was a natural son, of Haimon Aymon Dinan, born about 975, who was Lord of Dinan, dit Vicomte, Comte Domnonia.

997-1004: Savary III. Son of Herbert I. He married twice: from the first marriage he had Geoffroy II; from the second marriage Hugues was born about 995. Having taken a field belonging to Lusignan, Savary was always in conflict with his neighbor Hugh IV of Lusignan.

1004-1015: Raoul I. Son of Herbert I. With his wife called Aremburge (or Ascelin), he had two children, Thibault Aimery and Aldegarde (Audéarde, Aldiarde), wife of Hugh IV of Lusignan. The Duke of Aquitaine and Count of Poitiers William the Great practiced a policy of balance (with a lot of duplicity) between Raoul and the Sire de Lusignan to neutralize them. William wrecked a marriage between the daughter of Raoul and Hugh de Lusignan by offering the latter the widow of Parthenay Josselin I (who had left an infant son). But in fact, the Duke arranged for that marriage to fail too, which caused a war between the Viscount of Thouars on one hand and the Sire de Lusignan, and even the duke on the other. The Vicomte Raoul died at the end of 1014 while ravaging the lands of Hugh de Lusignan.

1015-1055: Geoffroy II. Son of Savary III. He was married to Agnes de Blois, daughter of Eudes I of Blois and Berthe de Bourgogne.

1055-1093: Aimery IV. Son of Geoffroy II. He is one of the proven Companions of William the Conqueror. His first wife was Aremgarde. His second wife was Ameline, daughter of Geoffrey de Mauleon and sister of Raoul de Mauleon.

1093-1104: Herbert II. Son of Aimery IV. He died at the First Crusade in Jaffa (Palestine) in 1104. He was the son of Aimery IV and Ameline. He immediately succeeded his father Aimery IV. On February 10, 1096, Bishop Peter of Poitiers restores Airvault Abbey, with the agreement of Herbert, Viscount of Thouars, son of the late Viscount Aimery. On December 7, 1099, his family surrounding Arbert at the dedication of the Church of St. Nicolas de la Chaise, started by his father and has been completed; then found him with his brother Geoffrey, told Tiffauges, its Sister Hildegard is wife of Hugues de Lusignan, Raoul and his uncle, said Maule. At that time we can measure the extent of Viscount of Thouars by fiefs under its control. These are Bressuire, Gifted, Passavant, the Argenton Chateau, Airvault, La Foret sur Sevre, Montaigu, La Roche sur yon, Till, Châteaumur, Pouzauges, Les Essarts, Lezay, Commequiers, and more.

Like many of his contemporaries, Viscount Herbert went to Palestine, the first time in 1098. He left with his brother Geoffrey in 1102 as part of the crusade led by the Duke William IX of Aquitaine. His banner was golden strewn with fleur de lys Azure, Gules franc area. These arms have remained those of his house, they then become those of the city of Thouars. Many pilgrims died during the journey from Constantinople in Jerusalem. Although Herbert wanted to go back to France, he died in Jaffa in 1104. He was buried near the church of Saint Nicolas de Jaffa. He married 1095 to Agnes with whom he had two sons: Herbert and Aimery VI.

1104-1123: Geoffroy III. Son of Aimery IV. He was married in 1094 to Ameline.

1123-1127: Aimery V. Son of Geoffroy III. He was married to Agnes, daughter of William IX of Aquitaine

1127-1139: Aimery VI. Son of Herbert II. He was married to Mathilde d'Aquitaine.

1139-1151: William I. Son of Aimery V.

1151-1173: Geoffroy IV. Son of Aimery V. He was married Aenor de Lusignan, daughter of Hugh VII of Lusignan and Saracena de Lezay. He married one of his younger sons, Guy of Thouars, to Constance, Duchess of Brittany. Geoffroy's granddaughter by Guy and Constance, Alix would become Duchess of Brittany in her own right. Alix would be the only member of the House of Thouars to hold this ducal crown.

1173-1226: Aimery VII. Son of Geoffroy IV. He was married to Agnes de Laval, daughter of Baron Guy V de Laval and Agathe. Then he married his second wife Mary.

1226-1229: Hugues I. Son of Geoffroy IV. He was married to Marguerite de Vihiers. In 1236, his widow, Marguerite, would marry Pierre Mauclerc, the widowed husband of Alix of Thouars (the granddaughter of Geoffrey IV of Thouars above).

1229-1233: Raymond I. Brother of Aimery VII and Hugues I.

1233-1242: Guy I. Son of Aimery VII. He was married Alix de Mauleon, daughter of Savary de Mauleon I and Belleassez Pouzauges Dame de Pareds.

1242-1246: Aimery VIII. Son of Aimery VII. He was married to Beatrix Machecoul Lady of La Roche sur Yon (widow of William de Mauleon Lord Talmond).

1246-1256: Aimery IX. Son of Guy I. He was married to Marguerite de Lusignan, widow of Raymond VII Count of Toulouse.

1256-1269: Renaud or Reginald of Thouars. Son of Guy I. He was married to Eleanor of Soissons.

1269-1274: Savary IV. Son of Guy I. He was married to Agnes de Pons.

1274-1308: Guy II. Son of Aimery IX. He was married to Marguerite de Brienne.

1308-1332: Jean I. Son of Guy II. He was married to Blanche de Brabant.

1332-1333: Hugues II. Son of Guy II. He was married to Jeanne de Beaucay.

1333-1370: Louis I. Son of Jean I. He was married to Jeanne de Dreux, daughter of John of Dreux and Péronelle de Sully. Then he married his second wife, Isabella of Avaugour widow of Geoffroy de Chateaubriand VIII.

losangé d'or et de gueules

1370–1397: Péronelle. Daughter of Louis I. She married twice: first to Amaury IV de Craon; following his death in 1376, she married Tristan Rouault de Boleménard.

- With her was extinguished the old branch of the first House of Thouars that possessed the viscounty for more than five centuries.

=== House of Amboise ===
palé d'or et de gueules de six pièces

=== House of Valois ===
In 1469 king Louis XI of France awarded the viscountcy of Thouars to his daughter Anne when she was betrothed to Nicolas d'Anjou. However, Nicholas handed the title back to the king on becoming Duke of Lorraine in 1472 (dying a year later, aged 25). The viscountcy thus reverted to the king, who started the proceedings to grant it to Louis I de La Trémoille but the king died in 1483 leaving his successor to complete them.

=== House of La Trémoille ===
==== Viscounts ====
- Louis I de La Trémoille
- Louis II de La Trémoille, son, called the chevalier sans reproche, defeated and captured Francis II, Duke of Brittany at the Battle of Saint-Aubin-du-Cormier (1488), distinguished himself in the Italian Wars, and was killed at the Battle of Pavia (1525).
- Charles I de La Trémoille, son, died in his father's lifetime and under his command at the Battle of Marignano (1515).
- François II de La Trémoille, son, acquired a claim on the Kingdom of Naples by his marriage with Anne de Laval, daughter of Charlotte of Aragon

==== Dukes ====
- Louis III de La Trémoille, son, became duke of Thouars in 1563, and his son
- Claude de La Trémoille, son, turned Protestant, was created a peer of France in 1595, and married a daughter of William the Silent in 1598.
  - Charlotte de la Tremoüille, Countess of Derby, daughter
- Henry de La Trémoille, son of Claude, 3rd duke of Thouars (died 1674)
- Henry Charles de La Trémoille, son of Henry (died 1672)
- Charles Belgique Hollande de La Trémoille, son of Henry, 4th duke of Thouars (died 1709)
- Charles Louis Bretagne de La Trémoille, son of Charles-Belgique, 5th duke of Thouars (died 1719)
- Charles Armand René de La Trémoille, son of Charles-Louis, 6th duke of Thouars (died 1741)
- Jean Bretagne Charles de La Trémoille, son of Charles-Armand, 7th duke of Thouars (died 1792)
- Charles Bretagne Marie de La Trémoille, son of Jean-Bretagne, 8th duke of Thouars (died 1839)
- Louis Charles de La Trémoille, son of Charles-Bretagne, 9th duke of Thouars (died 1911)
- Louis Charles Marie de La Trémoille, son of Louis-Charles, 10th duke of Thouars (died 1921)
- Louis Jean Marie de La Trémoille, son of Louis-Charles-Marie, 11th duke of Thouars (died without issue 1933)

== Sources ==
- Hugues Imbert, Histoire of Thouars, Mémoire de la Société de Statistique des Deux-Sèvres, t. X, Niort, édition Clouzot, 1870. ISBN 2-84178-083-X.
- H. Imbert, "Notice sur les vicomtes of Thouars"; Mémoires de la Société des Antiquaires de l'Ouest, year 1864, p. 321-431.
- Publié dans le bulletin de la Société Historique et Scientifique des Deux-Sèvres, third series, vol II, 1st semester 1994, p. 11-20.
