= Charles, 2nd Duke d'Ursel =

Belgian Duke (1717–1775)

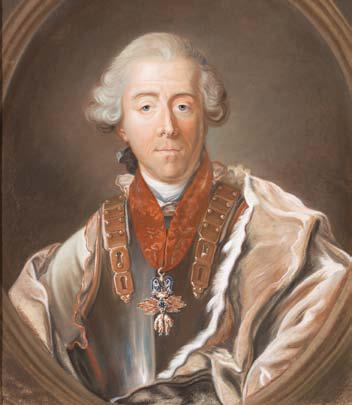

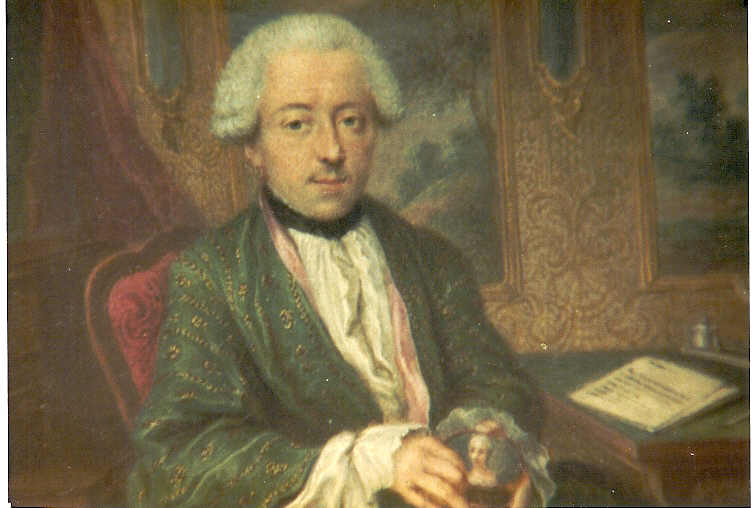
The 2nd Duke d'Ursel

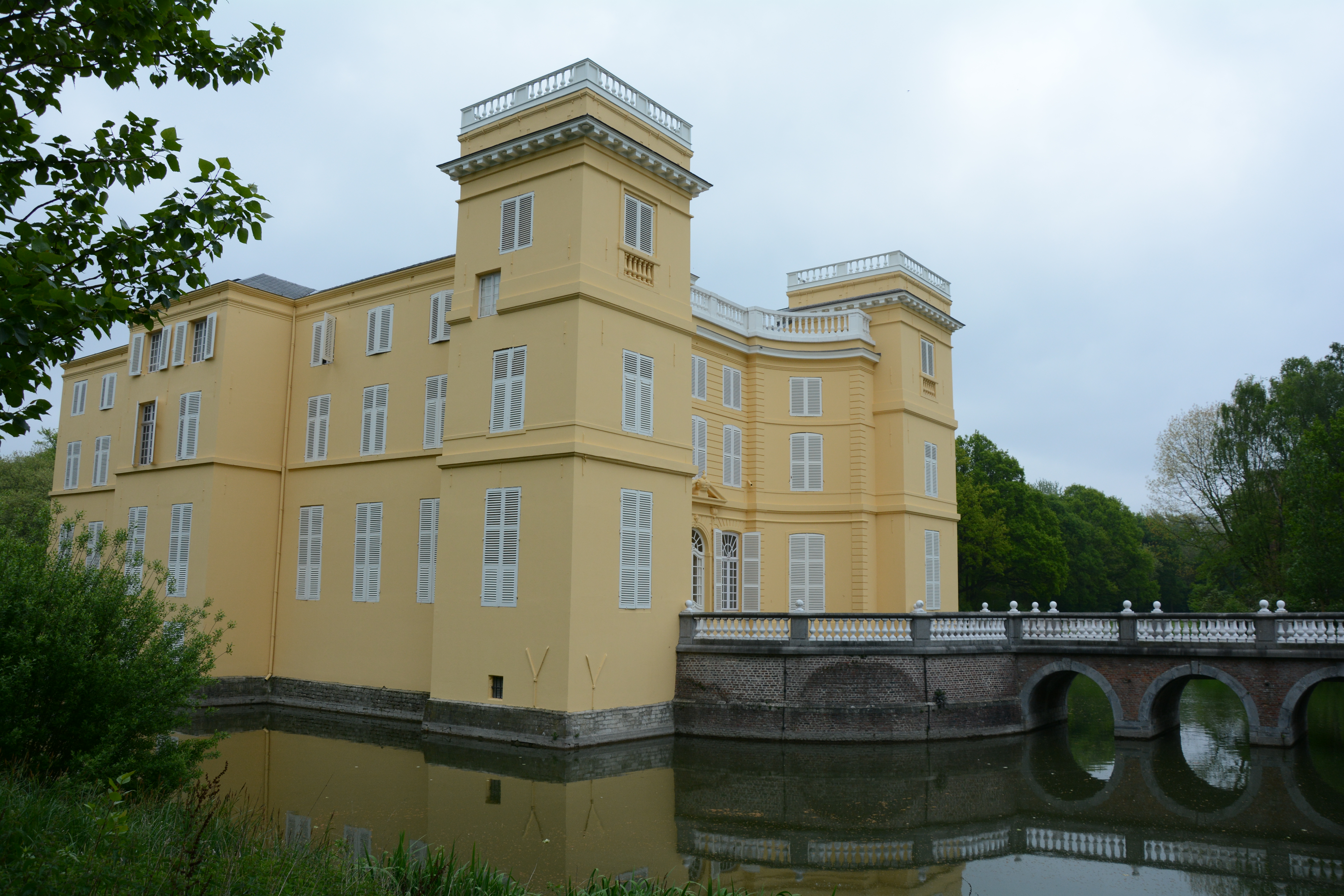
D'Ursel Castle, exterior commissioned by the Second Duke

Charles Elisabeth Conrard, 2nd Duke d'Ursel and of Hoboken, Prince of Arches and Charleville and Count of Grobbendoncq (1717–1775) was a Duke from the Holy Roman Empire. He succeeded his father and became the second Duke of Ursel in 1738.

He was the First Prince of Arche and Charleville of the Ursel Branche, titles inherited by his mother Princess zu Salm. He made career at the imperial court in Vienna, was Imperial Lord Chamberlain and Field Marshal. He was made knight of the Golden Fleece in 1771.

== Hingene ==
Charles was of importance for the familial patrimony: he decides to engage Giovanni Niccolò Servandoni to redesign the Castle of Hingene both the interior and exterior are restyled. Servadoni designs great plans to reshape the whole castle and garden, however the duke refuses. The current facade of the castle still has the classical impression of this era.

== Family ==
He was the son of Conrad-Albert, 1st Duke d'Ursel (1665–1738), and Elisabeth Eleonora of Salm. He married in Vienna to the eldest daughter of Georg Christian, Fürst von Lobkowitz and Henriette von Waldstein-Wartenburg (1702 - 1780). Through this line the family descends of Ferdinand I, Holy Roman Emperor. His sister was married to the Duke of Bournonville. He became brother in law of the bishop of Ghent Ferdinand-Marie de Lobkowitz.

=== Children ===
1. Ferdinand-Marie d'Ursel
2. Emanuel Maximilian d'Ursel
3. Wolfgang Guillaume Joseph Léonard Vital, 3rd Duke of Ursel: Married Flore von Arenberg
4. Charlotte Philippine Elisabeth Eleonore d'Ursel, married Freiherr von Stein
5. Marie Henriette Christine Leonarde d'Ursel, married Joseph, Count de Ferraris.
6. Maria Anne d'Ursel

After his death he was succeeded by his son Wolfgang, who became 3rd Duke of Ursel.

== Ancestry ==
Ancestors of Charles, 2nd Duke d'Ursel

16. Conrad III Schetz; 1st Baron of Hoboken
8. Conrad, 1st Count of Ursel
17. Barbara of Ursel
4. Francois, 2nd Count of Ursel; 3rd Baron of Hoboken
18. don Juan de Robles; 1st Count of Annappes
9. Anne Maria de Robles
19. Marie de Liedekerke
2. Conrard-Albert, 1st Duke d'Ursel; Count of Grobbendonk
20. Gerald de Hornes, 1st Count of Bassignies (1560-1612),
10. Ambroise de Hornes, 2nd Count of Bassignies, (1609-1656)
21. Honorine de Witthem
5. Honorine, Lady of Hornes-Bassignies
22. Maximilien de Bailleul, baron of Lesdain
11. Marguerite-Marie de Bailleul-Lesdaing
23. Christine de Lalaing
Charles, 2nd Duke d'Ursel
24. Philipp Otto zu Salm
12. Leopold Philipp Karl, Furst zu Salm
25. Christiane von Croy-Aarschot
6. Charles Theodore, Prince of Salm
26. Dirk, count of Bronckhorst-Batenburg-Anholt
13. Maria Anna von von Bronckhorst-Batenburg
27. Maria, Lady of Immerseel
3. Eleonora Christina zu Salm
28. Frederick V of the Palatinate
14. Edward, Count Palatine of Simmern
29. Elizabeth Stuart, Queen of Bohemia
7. Luise Marie of the Palatinate
30. Charles Gonzaga, Duke of Mantua and Montferrat
15. Anne Gonzaga
31. Catherine de Lorraine, dite Mayenne
