= Dauphine of France =

Wife of the heir apparent to the French throne

The dauphine of France (/ˈdɔːfiːn, dɔːˈfiːn/, also US: /ˈdoʊfiːn, doʊˈfiːn/, French: [dofin]) was the wife of the dauphin of France (the heir apparent to the French throne). The position was analogous to a crown princess (the wife of a crown prince and heir apparent to a throne).

== List of dauphines of France ==
=== House of Valois ===
Picture	Name	Father	Birth	Marriage	Became Dauphine	Ceased to be Dauphine	Death	Husband
	Joanna of Bourbon	Peter I, Duke of Bourbon (Bourbon)	3 February 1338	8 April 1350	22 August 1350 husband became the Dauphin	8 April 1364 became Queen	6 February 1378	Charles, 1st Dauphin
	Margaret of Burgundy	John the Fearless, Duke of Burgundy (Valois-Burgundy)	1393	31 August 1404		18 December 1415 husband's death	2 February 1441	Louis, 6th Dauphin
	Jacqueline, Countess of Hainaut	William II, Duke of Bavaria (Wittelsbach)	16 August 1401	6 August 1415	18 December 1415 husband became the Dauphin	4 April 1417 husband's death	8 October 1436	John, 7th Dauphin
	Margaret Stewart of Scotland	James I of Scotland (Stewart)	25 December 1424	24 June 1436		16 August 1445		Louis, 9th Dauphin
	Charlotte of Savoy	Louis, Duke of Savoy (Savoy)	11 November 1443/5	14 February 1451		22 July 1461 became Queen	1 December 1483	Louis, 9th Dauphin
	Catherine de' Medici	Lorenzo II de' Medici, Duke of Urbino (Medici)	13 April 1519	28 October 1533	10 August 1536 husband became the Dauphin	31 March 1547 became Queen	5 January 1589	Henry, 16th Dauphin
	Mary, Queen of Scots	James V of Scotland (Stewart)	8 December 1542	24 April 1558		10 July 1559 became Queen	8 February 1587	Francis, 17th Dauphin

=== House of Bourbon ===
Picture	Name	Father	Birth	Marriage	Became Dauphine	Ceased to be Dauphine	Death	Husband
	Duchess Maria Anna Victoria of Bavaria	Ferdinand Maria, Elector of Bavaria (Wittelsbach)	28 November 1660	7 March 1680		20 April 1690		Louis, "le Grand Dauphin", 20th Dauphin
	Princess Marie Adélaïde of Savoy	Victor Amadeus II of Sardinia (Savoy)	6 December 1685	7 December 1697	14 April 1711 husband became the Dauphin	12 February 1712		Louis, "le Petit Dauphin", 21st Dauphin
	Infanta Maria Teresa Rafaela of Spain	Philip V of Spain (Bourbon)	11 June 1726	23 February 1745		22 July 1746		Louis, 24th Dauphin
	Princess Maria Josepha of Saxony	Augustus III of Poland (Wettin)	4 November 1731	9 February 1747		20 December 1765 husband's death	13 March 1767	Louis, 24th Dauphin
	Archduchess Maria Antonia of Austria	Francis I, Holy Roman Emperor (Habsburg-Lorraine)	2 November 1755	16 May 1770		10 May 1774 became Queen	16 October 1793	Louis Auguste, 25th Dauphin
	Princess Marie Thérèse of France	Louis XVI (Bourbon)	19 December 1778	10 June 1799	16 September 1824 husband became the Dauphin	2 August 1830 became Queen	19 October 1851	Louis Antoine, Duke of Angoulême / 26th Dauphin

== See also ==
- Dauphine of Auvergne
- List of Angevin consorts
- Countesses and Duchesses of Maine
- List of consorts of Alençon
- List of consorts of Bourbon
- List of consorts of Vendôme
- Countess of Artois
- Countess of Provence
- List of consorts of Lorraine
- Princess of Condé
- List of consorts of Montpensier
- List of consorts of Conti
- List of consorts of Étampes
- Countess of Évreux
- Countess of Champagne
- List of consorts of Joinville
