= Anne Marie de Bourbon =

French princess (1675–1700)

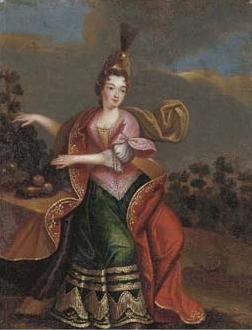
- Portrait c. 1690
- Born: 11 August 1675; Hôtel de Condé, Paris, France
- Died: 23 October 1700 (aged 25); Château d'Asnières, Asnières, France
- Burial: Carmel du faubourg Saint-Jacques, Paris, France
Names
- Anne Marie Victoire de Bourbon
- Father: Henri Jules de Bourbon
- Mother: Anne Henriette of Bavaria

Anne Marie Victoire de Bourbon (11 August 1675 – 23 October 1700) was the daughter of Henri Jules, Prince of Condé, and Anne Henriette of Bavaria. As a member of the reigning House of Bourbon, she was a Princesse du Sang. She never married and died of lung disease.

== Biography ==
Anne Marie Victoire was the seventh child born to the Duke and Duchess of Enghien. Her father was the only surviving son of le Grand Condé while her mother was a daughter of the political hostess Anna Gonzaga. She was born at the Hôtel de Condé in Paris, the city residence of the Prince of Condé when not at court at the Château de Saint-Germain-en-Laye outside the capital. The two previous months prior to Anne Marie's birth saw the death of two siblings: Anne de Bourbon (1670–1675), known as Mademoiselle d'Enghien till death and Henri de Bourbon, Count of Clermont (1672–1675).

Anne Marie was reputedly so small that she was prevented from going to dances at court. She was also more attractive than her younger sisters Mademoiselle de Charolais (1676–1753) and Mademoiselle de Montmorency (1678–1718).

She was known as Mademoiselle d'Enghien till 1688 when her oldest sister Mademoiselle de Bourbon married the Prince of Conti, the first cousin of their father. From then on, Anne Marie was known as Mademoiselle de Condé, taken from the title of Prince of Condé which her father succeeded to in 1684 at the death of le Grand Condé. It was the latter who organised the marriage between Mademoiselle de Bourbon and Conti.

Mademoiselle de Condé would never marry; instead she would die at the Château d'Asnières outside Paris, apparently of lung disease. She was buried at the convent of Carmel du faubourg Saint-Jacques, Paris. The Château itself was later the home of Philippe d'Orléans' mistress and later remodelled by the marquis d'Argenson.

Her brothers-in-law included the Prince of Conti; the duc du Maine (illegitimate son of Louis XIV and Madame de Montespan) and the famous general the Duke of Vendôme. Her sister in law was Louise Françoise de Bourbon, sister of Maine and mistress of Conti.

She was once a possible bride for the duc du Maine but it is said that Maine preferred Anne Louise Bénédicte de Bourbon, Mademoiselle de Charolais much to her annoyance. Her not marrying the duc du Maine is what reportedly caused her health to deteriorate till her early death aged 25. Another possible candidate was Georg Wilhelm of Ansbach., son of Johann Friedrich, Margrave of Brandenburg-Ansbach and brother of the future Caroline of Ansbach, the future Queen Consort of Great Britain.

Saint-Simon writing at the time after her death said that she had "a beautiful countenance, and an even more beautiful soul, great wit, sense, reason, kindness, and piety which sustained her in her very sad life. So was she really regretted by all who knew her".

== Ancestry ==
Ancestors of Anne Marie de Bourbon

8. Henri II, Prince of Condé
4. Louis II, Prince de Condé
9. Charlotte Marguerite de Montmorency
2. Henri Jules, Prince of Condé
10. Urbain de Maillé, 1st Marquis of Brézé
5. Claire-Clémence de Maillé-Brézé
11. Nicole du Plessis de Richelieu
1. Anne Marie de Bourbon
12. Frederick V of the Palatinate
6. Edward, Count Palatine of Simmern
13. Elizabeth Stuart
3. Anne Henriette of Bavaria
14. Charles Gonzaga, Duke of Mantua and Montferrat
7. Anna Gonzaga
15. Catherine of Lorraine
