= Luise Marie of the Palatinate =

- Princess of Salm
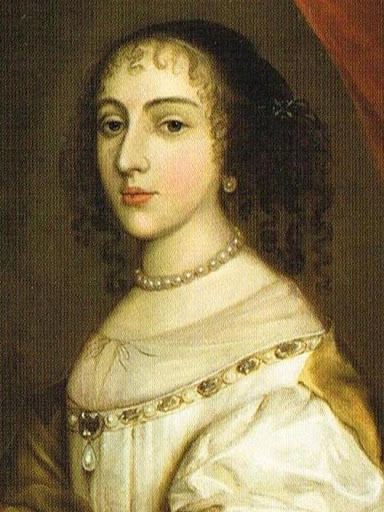
- Born: 23 July 1647; Paris, France
- Died: 11 March 1679 (aged 31); Aachen
- Spouse: Charles Theodore, Prince of Salm
- Issue Detail: Princess Luise Apollonia of Salm; Louis Otto, Prince of Salm; Eleonore, Duchess d'Ursel
- House: Palatinate-Simmern (by birth); Salm (by marriage)
- Father: Edward, Prince Palatine
- Mother: Anna Gonzaga

Luise Marie of the Palatinate (Luise Marie von der Plafz; 23 July 1647 – 11 March 1679) was a Palatine princess who married Charles Theodore, the Prince (Fürst) of Salm-Salm. A great-granddaughter of James I of England and niece of Sophia, Electress of Hanover, she and her family, as Catholics, were excluded from the line of succession to the British throne.

== Early life ==
Luisa Marie was the eldest daughter of the landless Prince Palatine Edward and his French-Italian wife, Anna Gonzaga. She was probably named after her mother's sister, Ludwika Maria Gonzaga, Queen of Poland (in German, Louise Marie). Her younger sisters were Anne Henriette, wife of Henri Jules, Prince de Condé and Benedicta Henrietta, wife of John Frederick, Duke of Brunswick-Lüneburg. On her father's side, she was a first cousin of George I of Great Britain and Elisabeth Charlotte, Duchess of Orléans.

== Marriage ==
On 20 March 1671, Luisa Marie married Charles Theodore, Prince of Salm, member of the House of Salm. They had:

- Princess Louise Apollonia of Salm, (23 February 1672 – 22 May 1678) died at the age of 6.
- Louis Otto, Prince of Salm (24 October 1674 – 23 November 1738)
- Princess Louise-Apollonia of Salm (1677–1678)
- Princess Eleonore Christine of Salm (14 March 1678 – 23 March 1737); married Conrad Albert, first Duke of Ursel. Eleonore and Conrad-Albert were the parents of Charles, 2nd Duke d'Ursel.

== Sources ==
- Jeffery, Renée (2018). Princess Elisabeth of Bohemia: The Philosopher Princess. Bloomsbury Publishing. ISBN 9798881884567.
