= Mademoiselle de Condé =

Mademoiselle de Condé may refer to one of the following:

- Anne Marie de Bourbon (1675-1700) daughter of Henri Jules, Prince of Condé and Anne of Bavaria.
- Marie Anne Éléonore de Bourbon (1690-1760) daughter of Louis, Prince of Condé, Duke of Bourbon and Louise Françoise de Bourbon.
- Louise Adélaïde de Bourbon (1757–1824) daughter of Louis Joseph, Prince of Condé and Charlotte de Rohan.
