= Jean-Baptiste Alexandre Le Blond =

French architect (1679–1719)

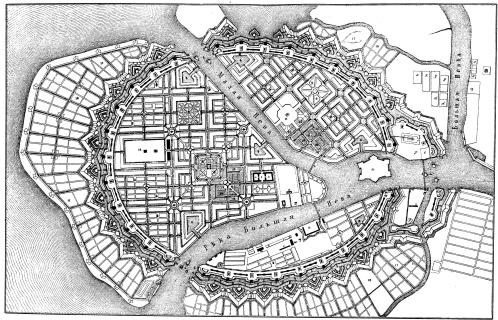
Le Blond's master plan for St. Petersburg has been known as "a plan conceived by a gardener".

Jean-Baptiste Alexandre Le Blond (1679 – 10 March 1719) was a French architect and garden designer who became the chief architect of Saint Petersburg in 1716.

== Career in France ==
He was the son of Jean Le Blond, painter in ordinary to the king, a printseller on the Pont Saint-Michel, Paris, and his wife, Jeanne d'Eu. He studied architecture with his mother's brother Jean Girard, in the service of Philippe I, duc d'Orléans. Jacques-François Blondel implied that he had derived gardening expertise from André Le Nôtre, finding that Le Blond was

one of our Architects, who among us most knew how to profit from the precepts of the great Master... It must be agreed, however, that, in imitating them, it would be suitable to be provided with a certain intelligence

Indeed, Le Blond was responsible for more than simply the engravings in Dezallier d'Argenville's seminal work on the principles of French formal garden design, La théorie et la pratique du jardinage, 1709: according to the well-informed connoisseur Pierre-Jean Mariette, chronicler of French artists, he laid out the structural "canvas" of the work and oversaw in detail its writing; the work was published anonymously, but in later editions Le Blond was credited with the text.

Named architecte du Roi, he made a set of presentation drawings, dated 1699, for the famous cascade and basin with its jet d'eau at the royal Parc de Saint-Cloud constructed several hôtels particuliers in Paris, notably the Hôtel de Clermont, Rue de Varenne, and the Hôtel de Vendôme, Rue d'Enfer (today Boulevard Saint-Michel).

As theoretician and illustrator of architecture, Le Blond produced the second (1710) and third (1720) editions of the Cours d'architecture de Vignole translated with commentary by Charles-Augustin d'Aviler, which Le Blond illustrated with his own drawings. These works introduced the distinctions between state apartments (appartements de parade) and private apartments (appartements de commodités) that would characterize French eighteenth-century planning, and he popularized the small chimneypieces that would take the place of the large ones in the Italian mode, popular in the previous century. He also provided illustrations for L’Histoire de l'abbaye de Saint-Denis (1706) by Michel Félibien.

== Career in Russia ==
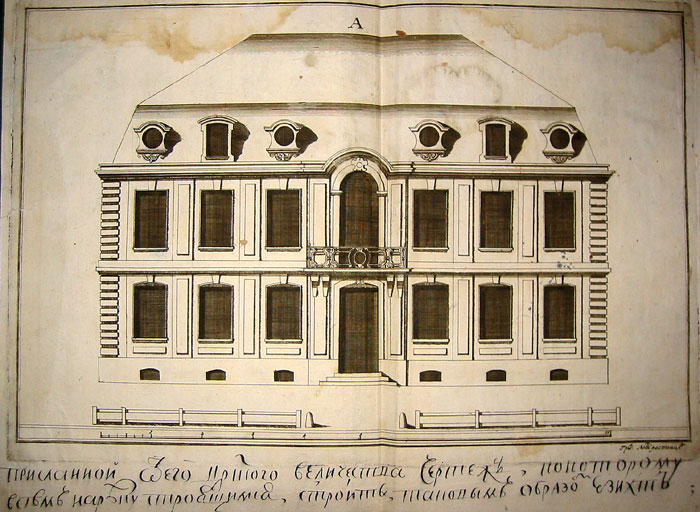
Le Blond's standard design of Saint Peterburg buildings, 1716

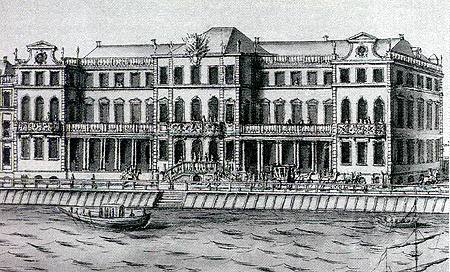
Apraksin Palace in St. Petersburg

Le Blond did much in a short time to extend the Le Nôtre style beyond France. His cascade at Saint-Cloud may have convinced Peter the Great: in March 1716, Le Blond accepted the tsar's invitation to work at Saint Petersburg, where he arrived in August. An unprecedented title of "Architect-General" was bestowed upon him, together with a pension of some 5,000 roubles. His position was superior to that of all other architects and builders working in St. Petersburg.

Within a short span of his stay there, Le Blond established the first nurseries along the banks of the Neva and about twenty workshops, specializing in carving, sculpture, stucco work, tapestries, and so forth. He also succeeded in introducing a program of illuminating the main streets with oil lanterns, designed by himself.

Among his Russian projects, probably the best known is an idealistic plan which envisioned Vasilievsky Island as the focus of the new city. Le Blond's plan would have "enclosed the entire city within a perfectly elliptical wall of fortifications", with a network of streets at right angles and squares like the royal squares of France, but the project was not approved. Nor were his projects for the parterres of the Summer Garden and a residence for the tsar at Strelna (1717). Three centuries passed before Le Blond's design for a formal garden at Strelna was eventually implemented during the reconstruction of the Constantine Palace in 2003.

Le Blond's main building work in St. Petersburg was a palace of Count Apraksin. Although foreign visitors admitted that "even a king would have been jealous of such a noble dwelling," the palace was eventually demolished to make room for the Winter Palace, which now occupies the site. Working with Friedrich Braunstein and Niccolo Michetti, the French architect also made many structural plans to the first palace and cascades of Peterhof (1717) for which none of his drawings survive, but which are known through copies made by J.E. Randahl, 1739.

The architect died suddenly of smallpox in February 1719. The tsar himself was present at the funeral, but Le Blond's grave at the St. Sampson cemetery has not survived.

== Principal works of architecture ==
- Hôtel de Vendôme (Hôtel de Chaulnes from 1733 to 1758), Rue d'Enfer, 1706–1707, for Antoine de La Porte, canon of Notre-Dame, backing onto the Jardin du Luxembourg (today housing the École nationale supérieure des mines de Paris); work also for Marie Anne de Bourbon.
- Reconstruction of the Hôtel de Duras, rue Saint-Augustin, 1708, for Louise-Madeleine de La Marck, widow of Henri de Durfort, duc de Duras.
- Hôtel de Clermont, 69 rue de Varenne, 1713, for Jeanne Thérèse Pélagie d'Albert de Luynes, marquise de Saissac.
- House at Meudon, 1714, for Jeanne Baptiste d'Albert de Luynes, comtesse de Verrue.
- Archbishop's Palace, Auch.
- Jardins du Canet, near Narbonne.
- Maison Regnault at Châtillon-sous-Bagneux.
- Apraksin Palace, Saint Petersburg, 1717–1718.
- Strelna and Peterhof parks, 1717–1718.
