= Aimery IV of Thouars =

Norman nobleman

Arms of the Viscounts of Thouars

Aimery IV viscount of Thouars (c. 1024 – c. 1094) was a companion of William the Conqueror on his Invasion of England in 1066.

== Life ==
He was the son of Geoffrey II of Thouars, and Agnes de Blois, daughter of Odo I, Count of Blois and Bertha of Burgundy.

In 1055 he was allied with Geoffroy Martel, Count of Anjou, against William, Duke of Normandy, and he participated in the siege of Ambrières, a castle built by William on the border of the County of Maine. After returning to Thouars in 1056, he joined the army of the Duke of Aquitaine to fight against the Saracens in Spain. He participated in the capture of Barbastro and brought a rich booty back to his hometown of Thouars.

In 1066, he was in England as part of the invading army of William the Conqueror. At the Battle of Hastings on 14 October 1066, he commanded a corps composed of Poitevins, Bretons, and Angevins. Aimery IV did not settle in England, however, but received ample reimbursement and returned to his continental lands.

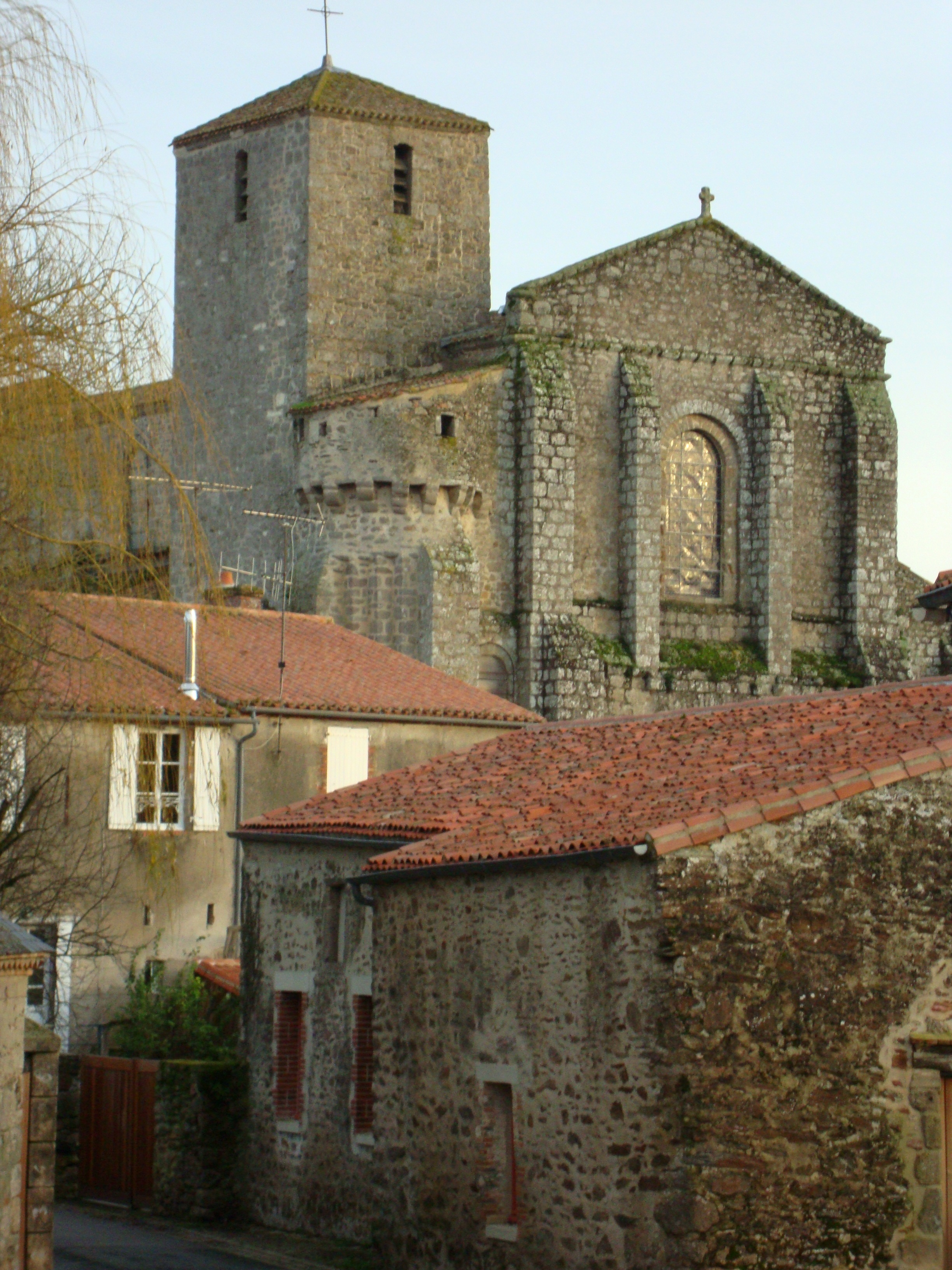
L'église de St. Nicolas, La Chaize

In Thouars, he rebuilt the castle in 1080. Aimery IV was also lord of La Chaize (near La Roche-sur-Yon), where he built a castle and a church dedicated to St. Nicolas.
Early in 1090, he made war on Pierre de Mortagne and took his castle. The Viscount of Thouars was assassinated by two of his own knights in 1093. He was buried in the church of Saint Nicolas in La Chaize.

== Marriages and issue ==
In 1045, he married Aremgarde (died bef. 1088) and had:

- Aimery (died 1090)
- Raoul (1060–1092)
- Eleanor or Aenora (1050–1093), who married Boson II Viscount of Chatellerault (fr) (1050–1092), parents of Aimery I of Châttellerault
- Hildegarde, married Hugh VI of Lusignan around 1065

He married secondly Ameline de Mauléon, daughter of Geoffrey de Mauléon and sister of Raoul de Mauléon. They had:

- Herbert II
- Geoffroy III

== See also ==
- Viscounts of Thouars

== Sources ==
- Abel, Mickey (2012). "Emma of Blois as Arbiter of Peace and the Politics". In Martin, Therese (ed.). Reassessing the Roles of Women as 'Makers' of Medieval Art and Architecture. Vol. 1. Brill.
- Settipani, Christian (2004). La noblesse du Midi carolingien: études sur quelques grandes familles d'Aquitaine et du Languedoc du IX au XI siecles (in French). Prosopographica et Genealogica.
