= Charles Theodore =

Charles Theodore may refer to:

- Charles Theodore, Elector of Bavaria (1724–1799)
- Charles Theodore, Prince of Salm (1645–1710)
