= Robert V =

Robert V may refer to:

- Robert V, Count of Dreux
- Robert de Brus, 5th Lord of Annandale
