= Péronelle, Countess of Dreux =

Countess of Dreux

Péronnelle, Countess of Dreux
- Born: c. 1330
- Died: 30 October 1397; Puybéliard, France
- Noble family: House of Thouars
- Spouse: Amaury IV de Craon
- Father: Louis I, Viscount of Thouars
- Mother: Joan II, Countess of Dreux

Péronnelle (c. 1330 – 30 October 1397) was Countess of Dreux from 1365 to 1377 and Viscountess of Thouars from 1370 to 1397. She was the daughter of Joan II, Countess of Dreux and Louis I, Viscount of Thouars. With her death, the elder branch of the House of Thouars, which had controlled the viscounty for more than five centuries, ended.

She first married, in 1345, Amaury IV de Craon, lord of Craon, Saint-Maure, Chantocé, Ingrande, and Sablé. After he died in 1373, she married in 1376 Rouault de Boisménard, called Tristan, lord of the Île de Ré, Marans, and Gamanches, son of André I and Marie de Montfaucon. He died in 1396. Both husbands became viscount of Thouars jure uxoris upon their marriage to Péronnelle.

In 1378, Charles V of France ceded Benon and its dependencies to Péronnelle and Tristan in exchange for the County of Dreux. Two letters by Gilbert Hasté, castellan and captain of Benon, declared the execution of this order by Charles on 28 August and 1 September. Wealthy due to this sale, the couple made several gifts to churches, notably to the Jacobin convent at Thouars.

== Sources ==
- du Chesne Tourangeau, André (1631). Histoire Genealogique de la Maison Royale de Dreux et de Quelques Autres Familles (in French). Paris: Chez Sebastien Cramoisy.
- Imbert, Hugues (1871). Histoire de Thouars (in French). Niort: L. Clouzot, Libraire-Éditeur.

Péronelle, Countess of Dreux House of Thouars Born: 1330 Died: 30 October 1397
Preceded by Simon	Countess of Dreux; 1365 – 1378	Ceded to France
Preceded by Louis I	Viscountess of Thouars; 1370 – 1397	Ceded to France
