= Joan I of Dreux =

Arms of the Counts of Dreux

Joan I (1345–1346), was the ruling suo jure Countess of Dreux in 1345–1346.

She was the only child of Peter, Count of Dreux and Isabeau de Melun, lady of Houdain. Her father died when she was not yet a year old, but she barely survived him, dying less than a year into her reign. Her aunt, Joan, succeeded her.

Regnal titles
Preceded by Peter	Count of Dreux; 1345–1346	Succeeded by Joan II
