= Peter, Count of Dreux =

Arms of the Counts of Dreux

Peter (1298 – 3 November 1345), was the Count of Dreux in 1331-1345.

He was the youngest son of John II, Count of Dreux and Jeanne of Beaujeu. He participated in the war of Philip VI of France, fighting against the Flemish who were revolting against their count, and he fought at the Battle of Cassel in 1328.

== Marriage and family ==
He married in 1341 Isabeau de Melun, lady of Houdain († 1389), daughter of John I, viscount of Melun, and Isabelle d'Antoing († 1354). From this marriage, he was the father of one daughter, Joan, who succeeded him in the county.

Regnal titles
Preceded by John III	Count of Dreux; 1331 – 1345	Succeeded by Joan I
