= Geoffrey II of Thouars =

Viscount of Thouars

Geoffrey II of Thouars (990–1055) was the son of Savary III. He was the viscount of Thouars from 1015 to 1043.

== Viscount ==
Geoffrey succeeded his uncle Ralph I in 1015, continuing the war against William V of Poitiers and Hugues IV of Lusignan, and capturing the castle of Mouzeuil. After years of indecisive warfare, peace was sealed with the marriage of the daughter of Ralph I, Audéarde, with Hugh IV of Lusignan.

Geoffrey's relations with Fulk III Nerra, Count of Anjou, were strained as a result of the castle built by Geoffrey at Montfaucon in 1026. The castle was a threat to the county of Anjou; in response, Fulk's castellan, Girorius, halted the castle's construction at the cost of his own life.

Despite this hostility, Geoffrey allied with the son of Fulk Nerra, Geoffrey II of Anjou, and assisted him in his attempt to seize power in the County of Poitiers and the Duchy of Aquitaine. They devastated the surroundings of Poitiers, while William VI, Duke of Aquitaine did the same in the Angevin regions of Loudun and Mirebeau. On 9 September 1033, Geoffrey Martel and Geoffrey II of Thouars defeat William at Moncontour.

Geoffrey de Thouars became a monk at Saint-Michel-en-l'Herm just before dying in 1055.

== Marriage and family ==
Geoffrey married Agnès de Blois, daughter of Odo I, Count of Blois and Bertha of Burgundy, they had:

- Aimery IV
- Savary, Viscount of Fontenay
- Geoffrey
- Raoul
- Hélène born about 1030, who married Archambaud I Janvre, lord of Bouchetière.

== See also ==
- Viscounts of Thouars

== Sources ==
- Abel, Mickey (2012). "Emma of Blois as Arbiter of Peace and the Politics". In Martin, Therese (ed.). Reassessing the Roles of Women as 'Makers' of Medieval Art and Architecture. Vol. 1. Brill.
- Bachrach, Bernard S. (1993). Fulk Nerra, the Neo-Roman Consul. University of California Press.
- Painter, Sidney (1957). "The Lords of Lusignan in the Eleventh and Twelfth Centuries". Speculum. 32 (Jan). University of Chicago Press. doi:10.2307/2849244. JSTOR 2849244. S2CID 161153870.
