= Robert III of Dreux =

French nobleman, count of Dreux from 1218 to 1234

Robert III, Count of Dreux
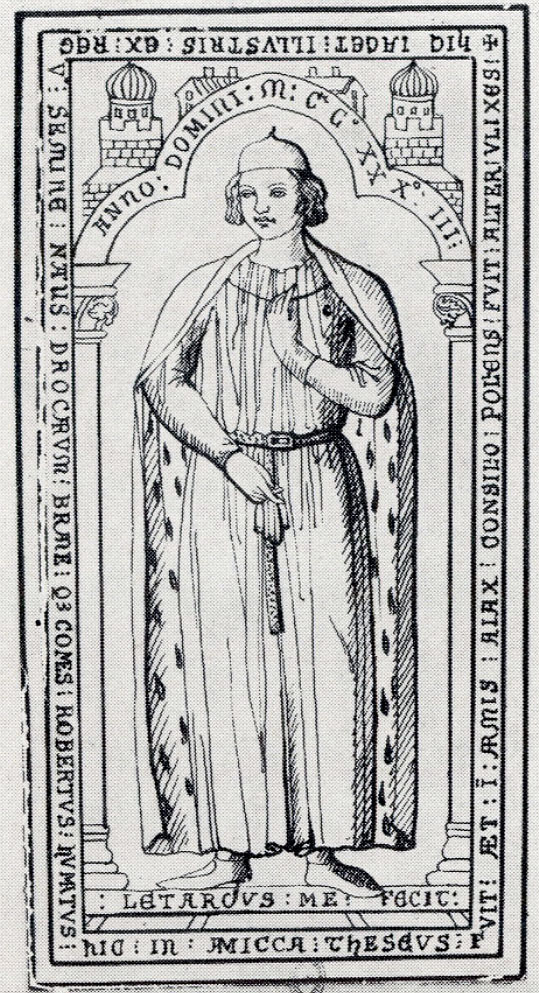
- Robert III of Dreux
- Born: 1185
- Died: 1234 (aged 48–49)
- Noble family: Dreux
- Spouse: Alianor de St. Valéry
- Issue: Yolande of Dreux; John I
- Father: Robert II of Dreux
- Mother: Yolanda de Coucy

Robert III of Dreux (1185–1234), Count of Dreux and Braine, was the son of Robert II, Count of Dreux, and Yolanda de Coucy. He was given the byname Gasteblé (lit. wheat-spoiler) when he destroyed a field of wheat while hunting in his youth.

Along with his brother Peter, Duke of Brittany he fought with the future Louis VIII of France in 1212 at Nantes and was captured there during a sortie. Exchanged after the Battle of Bouvines for William Longsword, Earl of Salisbury, he fought in the Albigensian Crusade, besieging Avignon in 1226. He was a supporter of Blanche of Castile during her regency after the death of Louis VIII in 1226.

In 1210 he married Alianor de St. Valéry (1192 – 15 Nov 1250) and they had several children:

- Yolande of Dreux (1212–1248), who married Hugh IV, Duke of Burgundy
- John I (1215–1249), later Count of Dreux.
- Robert (1217–1264), Viscount of Châteaudun
- Peter (1220–1250), a cleric.

== Sources ==
- Bubenicek, Michelle (2002). Quand les femmes gouvernent: droit et politique au XIVe siècle:Yolande de Flandre, Droit et politique au XIV siecle (in French). Ecole des Chartes.
- Evergates, Theodore (2007). The aristocracy in the county of Champagne, 1100-1300. University of Pennsylvania Press.
- Painter, Sidney (1982). William Marshal, Knight-Errant, Baron, and Regent of England. University of Toronto Press.
- Pollock, M.A. (2015). Scotland, England and France after the Loss of Normandy, 1204-1296, 'Auld Amitie'. The Boydell Press.
- Webster, Paul, ed. (2021). History of the Dukes of Normandy and the Kings of England by the Anonymous of Béthune. Translated by Shirley, Janet. Routledge.

Robert III of Dreux House of Dreux Cadet branch of the Capetian dynasty Born: 1185 Died: 1234
Preceded by Robert II	Count of Dreux; 1218–1234	Succeeded by John I
