= Talmont-Saint-Hilaire =

- Commune
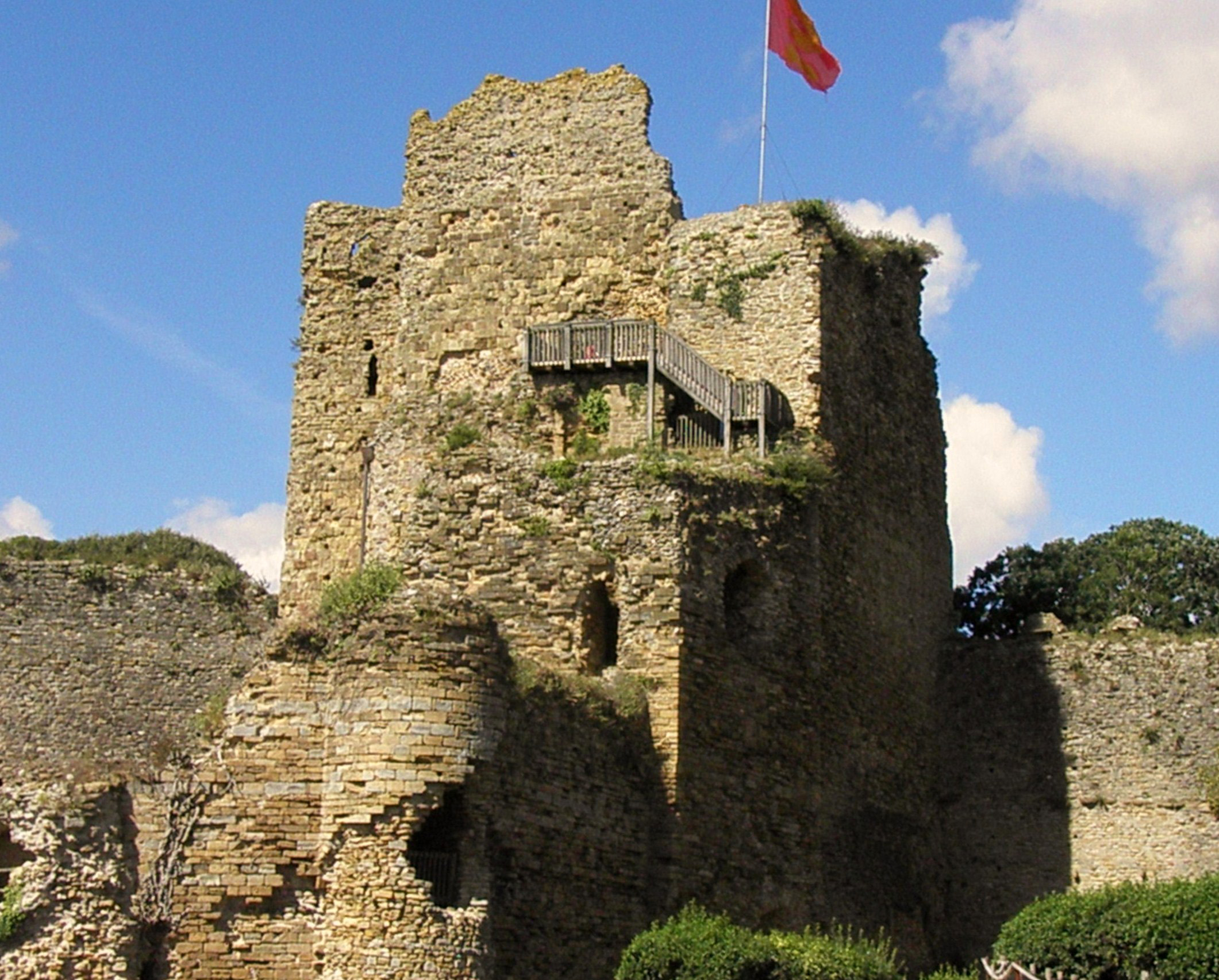
- Château de Talmont

- Flag Coat of arms
- Location of Talmont-Saint-Hilaire
- Location within France Location within Pays de la Loire
- Coordinates: 46°28′05″N 1°37′01″W
- Country: France
- Region: Pays de la Loire
- Department: Vendée
- Arrondissement: Les Sables-d'Olonne
- Canton: Talmont-Saint-Hilaire
- Intercommunality: Vendée Grand Littoral

Government
  - Mayor (2020–2026): Maxence de Rugy
- Area^{1}: 89.53 km^{2} (34.57 sq mi)
- Elevation: 25 m (82 ft)
- Highest elevation: 57 m (187 ft)
- Lowest elevation: 0 m (0 ft)
- Population (2023): 8,492
  - Density: 94.85/km^{2} (245.7/sq mi)
- Time zone: UTC+01:00 (CET)
  - Summer (DST): UTC+02:00 (CEST)
- INSEE/Postal code: 85288 /85440
- Website: https://talmont-saint-hilaire.fr/
- ^{1} French Land Register data, which excludes lakes, ponds, glaciers > 1 km^{2} (0.386 sq mi or 247 acres) and river estuaries.

Talmont-Saint-Hilaire (French pronunciation: [talmɔ̃ sɛ̃.t‿ilɛʁ]) is a commune in the Vendée department in the Pays de la Loire region in western France. The commune was formed by the merger of the former communes of Talmont and Saint-Hilaire-de-Talmont in 1974.

Richard I of England often had his base in Talmont, and owned the Château de Talmont from 1182 until his death.

== Population ==
Population data refer to the area corresponding with the commune as of January 2025.

Historical population
Year	Pop.	±% p.a.
1968	3,424	—
1975	3,347	−0.32%
1982	3,865	+2.08%
1990	4,409	+1.66%
1999	5,363	+2.20%
2007	6,693	+2.81%
2012	7,259	+1.64%
2017	7,657	+1.07%
2023	8,492	+1.74%
Source: INSEE

== See also ==
- Communes of the Vendée department
