= Anne Henriette of Bavaria =

Anne of Bavaria
- Princess of Condé
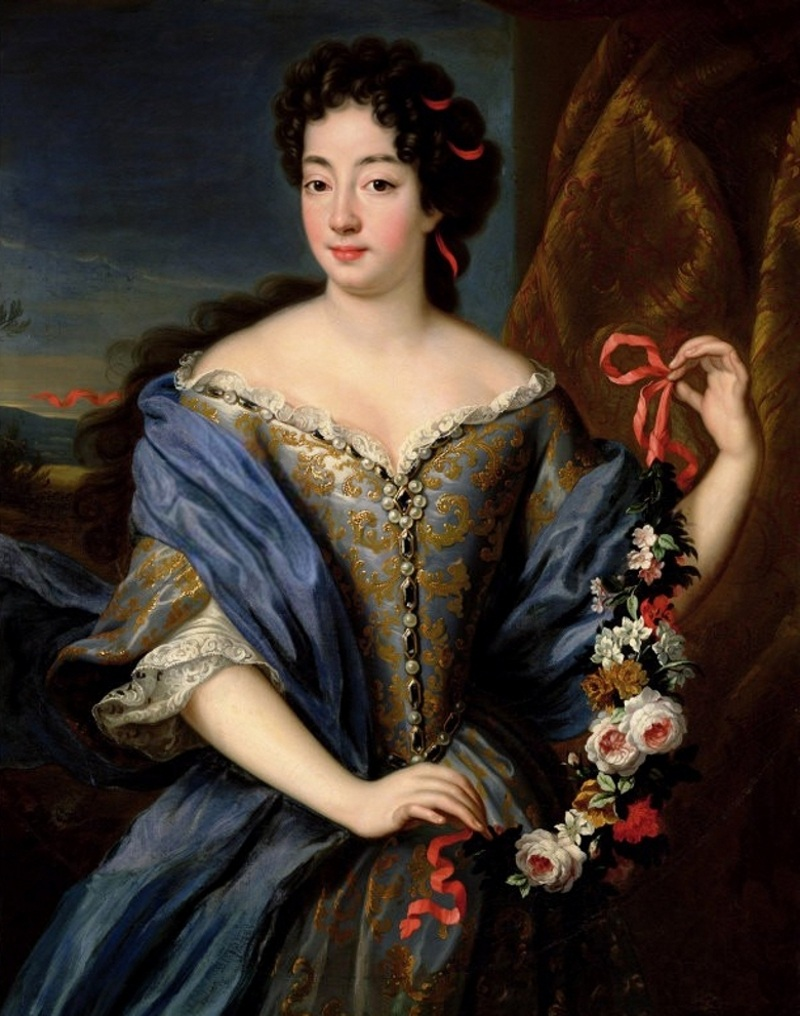
- Portrait by Gobert
- Born: 13 March 1648; Paris, France
- Died: 23 February 1723 (aged 74); Petit Luxembourg, Paris, France
- Burial: Carmel du faubourg Saint-Jacques, Paris
- Spouse: Henri Jules, Prince of Condé (m. 1663; died 1709)
- Issue Detail: Marie Thérèse, Princess of Conti; Louis III, Prince of Condé; Anne Marie, Mademoiselle de Condé; Louise Bénédicte, Duchess of Maine; Marie Anne, Duchess of Vendôme
Names
- Anne Henriette Julie
- Father: Edward, Count Palatine of Simmern
- Mother: Anna Gonzaga

Anne of the Palatinate (Anne Henriette Julie; 13 March 1648 – 23 February 1723) known in France as Anne of Bavaria or Princess Palatine, was a Princess of the Palatinate and Countess Palatine of Simmern by birth and was the wife of Henri Jules de Bourbon eldest son of Louis, Grand Condé. Following her father-in-law's death, her husband succeeded as Prince of Condé, a purely honorary title, but one of the highest ranking in France. She was also the Princesse of Arches and Charleville in her own right from 1708.

== Biography ==
Anne was born in Paris the second of the three daughters of Prince Palatine Edward. Her mother was Anna Gonzaga, a well known Parisian political hostess and sister of the Queen of Poland.

At the age of fifteen, she was engaged to Henri Jules, Duke of Enghien, the only surviving child of the famous military commander the Grand Condé. The Grand Condé was the most senior Prince du Sang at the French court ("First Prince of the Blood"). Henri Jules was his heir and prior to his succession to the purely honorary title of Prince of Condé, was styled the Duke of Enghien and was addressed Monsieur le Duc. The marriage ceremony took place at the Palais du Louvre on 11 December 1663 with King Louis XIV and the rest of the royal family in attendance. At this time, Anne became Madame la Duchesse, as Duchess of Enghien. At the death of her father-in-law in 1684, Anne took on the style of Madame la Princesse. She was also known as Anne, princesse Palatine.

Anne and Henri Jules had ten children. Henri Jules, who suffered from clinical lycanthropy, was greatly supported by his wife. Anne was described as very pious, generous, and charitable, and was praised by many at court for her very supportive nature towards her husband. Despite that, her husband, who was prone to great rages, would often beat his quiet wife, even in the presence of other courtiers. Of her many children, only five survived childhood, four of whom went on to marry.

Her mother was instrumental in helping bring about a marriage between her niece by marriage, Elisabeth Charlotte, Madame Palatine and the brother of Louis XIV, Philippe I, Duke of Orléans in 1671. Elisabeth Charlotte was Anne's first cousin, their fathers being brothers. In 1708, when her cousin Charles IV, Duke of Mantua died, being his heiress, Anne Henriette became the Princess of Arches in her own right. Charles IV was the last Duke of Mantua. The next year, Anne's husband died in Paris on 1 April 1709, aged 65, making her son, Louis, the next Prince of Condé.

Louis died the next year and his son Louis Henri, Duke of Bourbon became the next holder of the title. Anne also owned the Château du Raincy which was sold to the House of Orléans in 1769. She died in Paris at the age of 74, having outlived her husband and all but two of her children, namely the Princess of Conti and the Duchess of Maine. On her death, the principality of Arches became extinct; the title was claimed by her son, the Prince of Condé and her nephew, the son of her sister, Louise Marie of Bavaria. She was buried at the Carmel du Faubourg Saint-Jacques in Paris.

== Legacy ==
Anne was the princess for whom the Rue Palatine was named - the road in the 6th arrondissement of Paris where she had lived in the Petit Luxembourg, next to the Luxembourg Palace in Paris.

== Issue ==
Anne had ten children, only half of whom lived to adulthood.

Name	Portrait	Lifespan	Notes
Marie Thérèse de Bourbon; Princess of Conti		1 February 1666 – 22 February 1732	Born in Paris and known as Mademoiselle de Bourbon in her youth, she married her cousin François Louis, Prince of Conti and had issue; she was briefly titular Queen of Poland in 1697.
Henri de Bourbon; Duke of Bourbon		5 November 1667 – 5 July 1670	Died in childhood.
Louis de Bourbon; Duke of Bourbon; Prince of Condé		10 November 1668 – 4 March 1710	Born in Paris, he became the heir apparent of his father on his brother's death in 1670; he married Louise-Françoise de Bourbon, légitimée de France a daughter of Louis XIV; the couple had issue.
Anne de Bourbon; Mademoiselle d’Enghien		11 November 1670 – 27 May 1675	Died in childhood.
Henri de Bourbon; Count of Clermont		3 July 1672 – 6 June 1675	Born at Saint-Germain-en-Laye and died at the age of two in Paris.
Louis Henri de Bourbon; Count of La Marche		9 November 1673 – 21 February 1677	Born in Paris, he died at the age of three in the same city.
Anne Marie de Bourbon; Mademoiselle d'Enghien; Mademoiselle de Condé		11 August 1675 – 23 October 1700	Born in Paris, she died at the age of 25 at the Château Asnières.
Louise Bénédicte de Bourbon; Duchess of Maine		8 November 1676 – 23 January 1753	Born in Paris, she was known as Mademoiselle d’Enghien and then Mademoiselle de Charolais during her youth; she married another illegitimate child of Louis XIV, Louis Auguste de Bourbon, duc du Maine; the couple had issue.
Marie Anne de Bourbon; Duchess of Vendôme		24 February 1678 – 11 April 1718	Born in Paris, she was known as Mademoiselle de Montmorency and then Mademoiselle d’Enghien during her youth; she married her cousin, Louis Joseph de Bourbon, duc de Vendôme; the couple had no issue and Marie Anne died at the Hôtel de Vendôme.
N de Bourbon; Mademoiselle de Clermont		17 July 1679 – 17 September 1680	Born and died in Paris.

Anne Henriette of Bavaria House of Palatinate-Simmern Born: 1 February 1666 Died: 22 February 1733
French nobility
Preceded by Charles IV, Duke of Mantua	Princess of Arches; 1708–1723	Extinct
