= Château de Talmont =

Medieval castle in Vendée, France

- Talmont-Saint-Hilaire, France
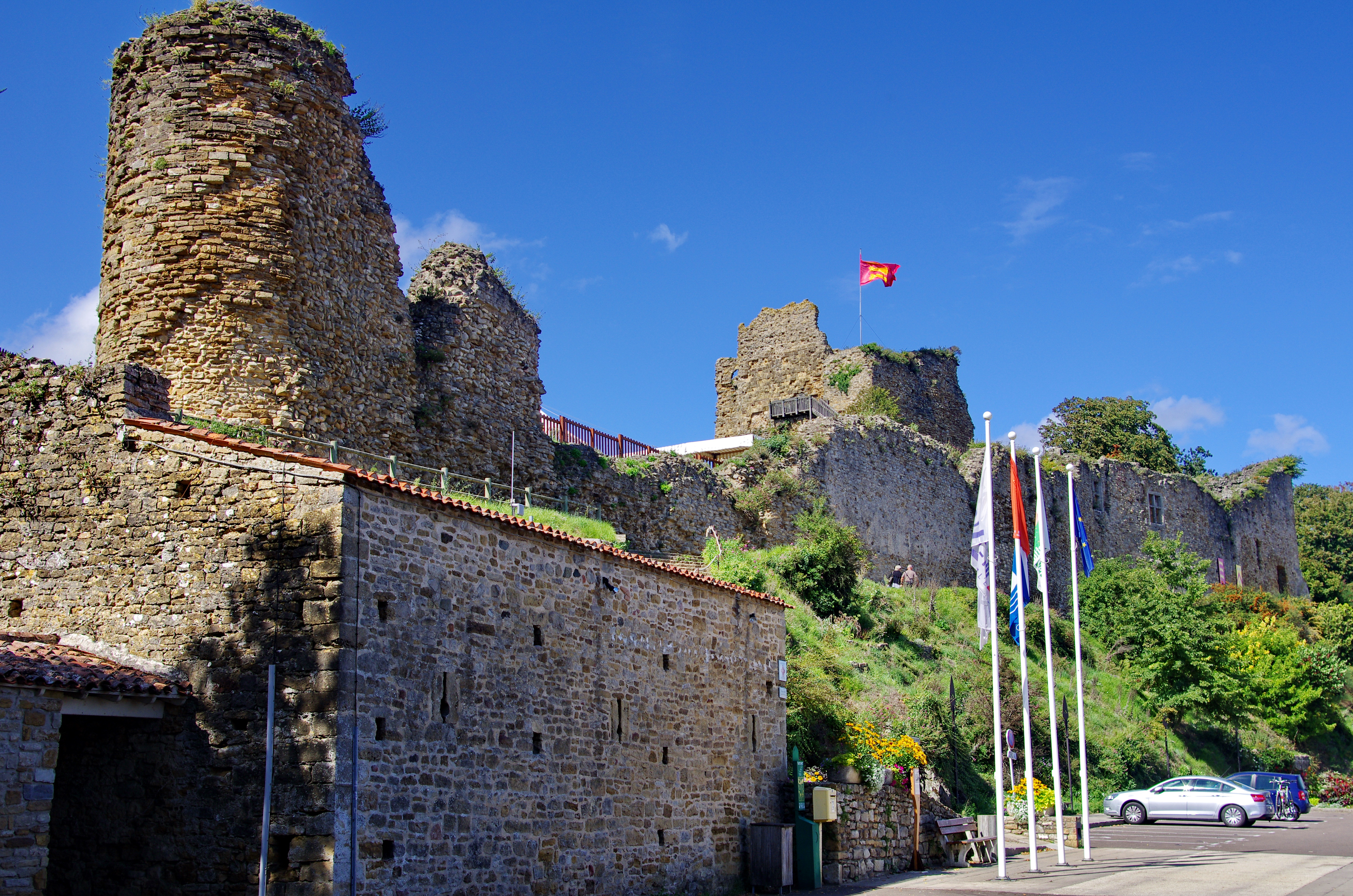
- Château de Talmont

Site information
- Open to the public: Yes

Location
- Shown within France
- Coordinates: 46.4681°N 1.6169°W

Site history
- Materials: Stone

Château de Talmont is a medieval castle in the Talmont-Saint-Hilaire commune in the Vendée department in the Pays de la Loire region of western France.

== History ==
The Château de Talmont was founded by the Count of Poitou in the 10th century and the first documentary records appear between 1040 and 1046. In 1138 the castle was held by Joscelin de Lezay, who was attacked by Louis VII; despite being considered invulnerable because it could be resupplied from the sea, the castle was burnt by the king. Talmont passed on to the Mauléons by the 1140s, but in 1182 Richard I of England became the lord of Talmont; he remained in control of the castle until his death in 1199, when it was returned to the Mauléon family.

== See also ==
- Castles in France
- List of castles in France

== Bibliography ==
- Baudry, Marie-Pierre (2001). Les Fortifications des Planagenêts en Poitou, 1154-1242. Paris: Comité des travaux historiques et scientifiques. ISBN 2-7355-0448-4.
