= Conrad-Albert, 1st Duke d'Ursel =

Dutch nobleman and general

Conrad-Albert d'Ursel
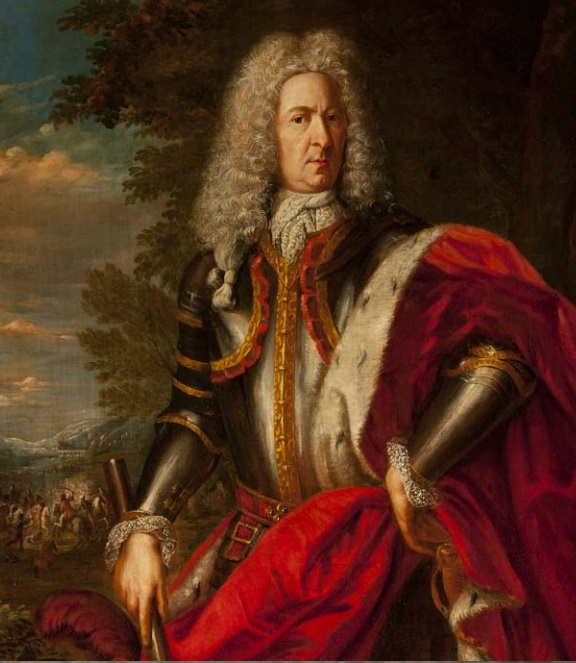

Duke of Ursel
- In office 1716–1738

Hereditary Marshal of Brabant
- In office 1726–1738

Personal details
- Born: 10 February 1665; Brussels
- Died: 3 May 1738 (aged 73); Namur

Conrad-Albert-Charles d'Ursel, 1st Duke d'Ursel and Hoboken (10 February 1665 – 3 May 1738) was a Dutch nobleman and general.

== Biography ==
Conrad-Albert was born in Brussels to François, 2nd Count of Ursel. During his childhood, his father purchased the rank of captain for him. He fought under the service of Leopold I during the Great Turkish War and later served in the Spanish army, where he was appointed General of the Armies in 1696. In 1704, Conrad-Albert was appointed Grand Bailiff of Hainault.

In 1713, Conrad-Albert married Eléonore, Princess of Salm, in Roermond; as a wedding gift, his cousin Charles-Hubert-Augustin Schetz, granted him the title Baron of Wesemael. Conrad-Albert and Eléonore had two children: Charles, 2nd Duke d'Ursel and Benoite-Charlotte, Count d'Ursel.

In August 1716, Conrad-Albert was created Duke of Ursel and the following year, he was created Duke of Hoboken. In 1718, he was appointed governor of Namur, although this did not take effect until 1732. After the death of Charles-Hubert-Augustin Schetz in 1726, he inherited the title Lord of Wesemael, becoming Hereditary Marshal of Brabant.

Belgian nobility
New creation	Duke of Ursel; 1716 – 1738	Succeeded by Charles, 2nd Duke d'Ursel
New creation	Duke of Hoboken; 1717 – 1738	Succeeded by Charles, 2nd Duke d'Ursel
Court offices
Preceded by Charles-Hubert-Augustin Schetz	Hereditary Marshal of Brabant; 1726 – 1738	Succeeded by Charles, 2nd Duke d'Ursel
