= Joan II of Dreux =

Arms of the Counts of Dreux

Joan II, Countess of Dreux (1309–1355), was ruling suo jure Countess regnant of Dreux 1346–1355.

== Life ==
She was the only child of John II of Dreux by his second wife, Perrenelle de Sully.

She married in 1330 Louis I, Viscount of Thouars (d. 1370), and with him had:

- Simon, (d. 1365), her successor, who married Jeanne "the damsel of Dreux" (1353–1420), daughter of John of Artois, Count of Eu
- Péronelle (d. 1397), co-countess of Dreux with her sisters, who married firstly in 1345 Amaury de Craon (d. 1373), then secondly, after 1376, Clement Rouault (d. 1397)
- Isabeau (d. 1397), co-countess of Dreux with her sisters, married firstly Guy de Nesles (d. 1352); secondly, in 1356, Ingelger d'Amboise; and thirdly Guillaume d'Harcourt (d. 1400)
- Marguerite (d. 1397), co-countess of Dreux with her sisters, married firstly Thomas de Chemille, and then secondly Guy Turpin, lord de Crisse

Regnal titles
Preceded by Joan I	Countess of Dreux; 1346–1355	Succeeded by Simon
