= John III of Dreux =

Arms of the Counts of Dreux

John III (c. 1295 – 1331), Count of Dreux, was the second son of John II of Dreux and of Jeanne of Beaujeu.

== Marriage and family ==
John succeeded his elder brother Robert in 1329. Around that time, he married Ida, daughter of Guy II, lord of Rosny, and of Laura of Ponthieu. As the marriage was childless, his brother, Peter succeeded him upon his death in 1331.

Regnal titles
Preceded by Robert V	Count of Dreux; 1329 – 1331	Succeeded by Peter
