= Duchess of Vendôme =

== House of Bourbon ==
Picture	Name	Father	Birth	Marriage	Became Duchess	Ceased to be Duchess	Death	Husband
	Françoise d'Alençon	René, Duke of Alençon (Alençon)	1491	18 May 1513	6 March 1516 husband's became Duke	25 March 1537 husband's death	14 September 1550	Charles
	Jeanne III of Navarre	Henry II of Navarre (Albret)	16 November 1528	20 October 1548		17 November 1562 husband's death	9 June 1572	Antoine
	Marguerite of France	Henry II of France (Valois)	14 May 1553	18 August 1572		17 December 1599 divorce	27 March 1615	Henri
	Françoise de Lorraine	Philippe Emmanuel, Duke of Mercœur (Lorraine)	November 1592	16 July 1609		22 October 1665 husband's death	8 September 1669	César
	Marie Anne de Bourbon	Henri Jules, Prince of Condé (Bourbon)	24 February 1678	21 May 1710		11 June 1712 husband's death	11 April 1718	Louis Joseph
	Marie Joséphine of Savoy	Victor Amadeus III of Savoy (Savoy)	2 September 1753	16 April 1771		1790 ceased to be duchess	13 November 1810	Louis Stanislas Xavier

== House of Orléans ==
Picture	Name	Father	Birth	Marriage	Became Duchess	Ceased to be Duchess	Death	Husband
	Princess Henriette of Belgium	Prince Philippe, Count of Flanders (Saxe-Coburg and Gotha)	30 November 1870	12 February 1896		1 February 1931	28 March 1948	Prince Emmanuel
	Philomena de Tornos Steinhart	Alfonso de Tornos y Zubiría (Tornos)	19 June 1977	19 March 2009		Incumbent		Prince Jean
