= Countess of Évreux =

The Countess of Évreux is a title in the County of Évreux, historically held by the wives of the Counts of Évreux. The following lists the countesses by the dynastic houses of their husbands.

== House of Normandy ==
Picture	Name	Father	Birth	Marriage	Became Countess	Ceased to be Countess	Death	Spouse
	Harleve of Rouen	-	-	-	996 husband's accession	16 March 1037 husband's accession	-	Robert
	Godehilde	-	-	after 1040		1067 husband's death	-	Richard
	Heloise de Nevers	William I, Count of Nevers (Monceaux)	1056?	-	1067 husband's accession	February 1113 or 18 April 1118		William

== House of Montfort-l'Amaury ==
Picture	Name	Father	Birth	Marriage	Became Countess	Ceased to be Countess	Death	Spouse

== House of Évreux ==
Picture	Name	Father	Birth	Marriage	Became Countess	Ceased to be Countess	Death	Spouse
	Margaret of Artois	Philip of Artois (Artois)	1285	1301		23/24 April or 26 October 1311		Louis
	Joan II of Navarre	Louis X & I of France and Navarre (Capet)	28 January 1312	18 June 1318	19 May 1319 husband's accession	16 September 1343 husband's death	6 October 1349	Philip
	Joan of Valois	John II of France (Valois)	24 June 1343	12 February 1352		3 November 1373		Charles I
	Eleanor of Castile	Henry II of Castile (Trastámara)	after 1363	27 May 1375	1 January 1387 husband's accession	1404; County's confiscation	27 February 1416	Charles II

== House of La Tour d'Auvergne ==
Picture	Name	Father	Birth	Marriage	Became Countess	Ceased to be Countess	Death	Spouse
	Countess Eleonora van den Berg	Graaf Frederik van den Bergh (van den Bergh)	6 May 1613	1 February 1634	1651 husband's accession	9 August 1652 husband's death	24 July 1657	Frédéric Maurice
	Marie Anne Mancini	Lorenzo Mancini (Mancini)	1649	20 April 1662		2 August 1679 title passed to son	20 June 1714	Godefroy Maurice

== See also ==
- Duchess of Bouillon
- List of Navarrese consorts
