= Robert V of Dreux =

Arms of the Counts of Dreux

Robert V of Dreux (c. 1293 – 22 March 1329), Count of Dreux and Braine, was the eldest son of John II of Dreux. His mother was Peronelle de Sully, the principal lady of Joan II, Countess of Burgundy's household. Robert was a supporter of Joan II's husband, Philip V of France. He succeeded his father as Count of Dreux in 1309 and reigned until his death in 1329. He married Marie d'Enghien in April 1321, but died without issue on 22 March 1329 in Braine and was succeeded by his brother, John III of Dreux.

== Sources ==
- Commire, Anne; Klezmer, Deborah (2000). Women in world history: a biographical encyclopedia. Waterford, Connecticut: Yorkin Publications. p. 100. ISBN 978-0-7876-4067-5.
- Denomy, A.J.; Bruckmann, J. (1959). "An Old French Poetic Version of the Life and Miracles of Saint Magloire". Mediaeval studies. XXI. Pontifical Institute of Mediaeval Studies: 53–128.
- Hillgarth, J. N. (1971). Ramón Lull and Lullism in fourteenth-century France. Oxford, UK: Clarendon Press.

Regnal titles
Preceded by John II	Count of Dreux; 1309–1329	Succeeded by John III
