= La Chaize-le-Vicomte =

- Commune
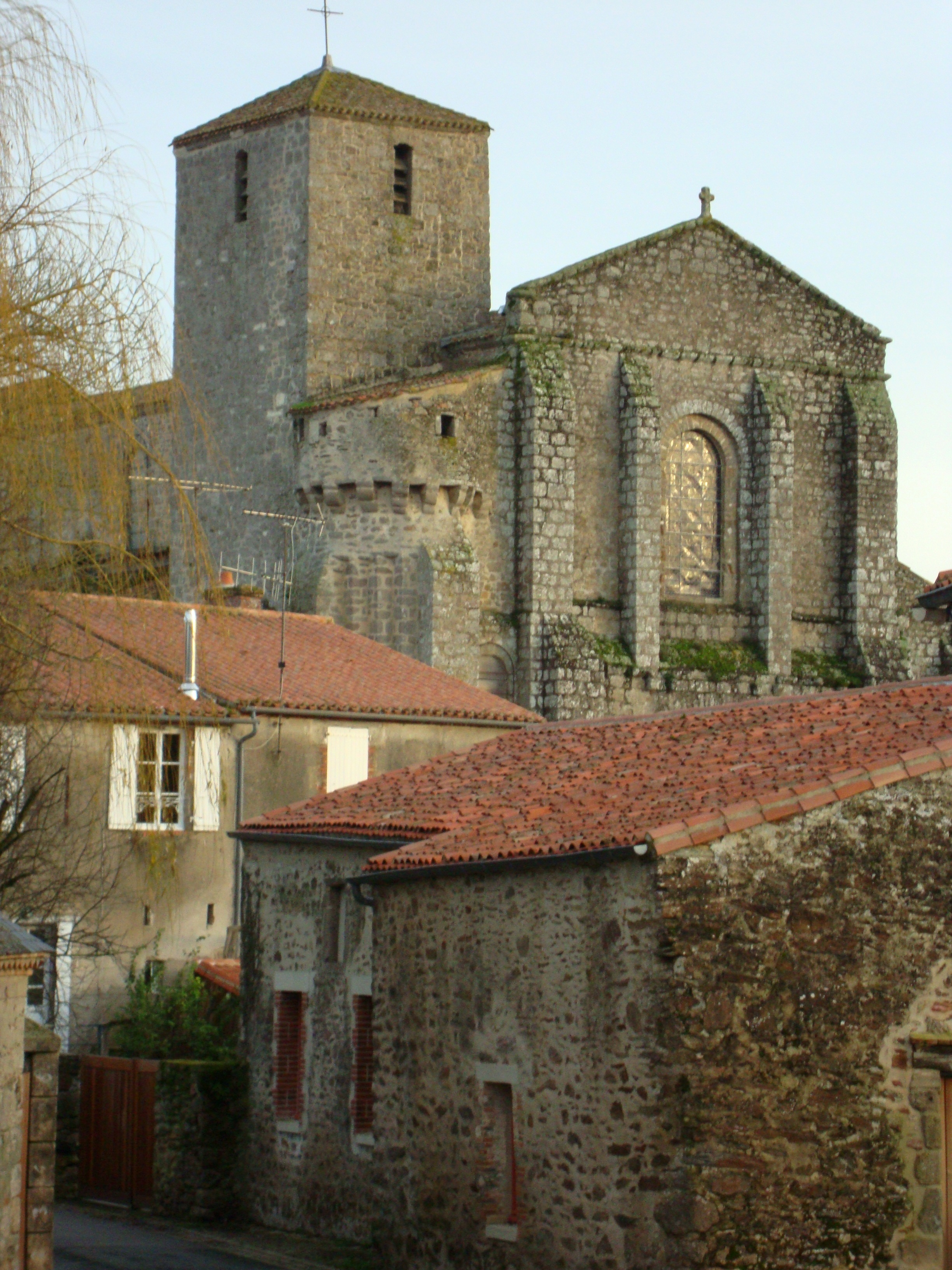
- The church of Saint-Nicolas, in La Chaize-le-Vicomte

- Coat of arms
- Location of La Chaize-le-Vicomte
- Location within France Location within Pays de la Loire
- Coordinates: 46°40′22″N 1°17′28″W
- Country: France
- Region: Pays de la Loire
- Department: Vendée
- Arrondissement: La Roche-sur-Yon
- Canton: La Roche-sur-Yon-2
- Intercommunality: La Roche-sur-Yon Agglomération

Government
  - Mayor (2020–2026): Yannick David
- Area^{1}: 49.51 km^{2} (19.12 sq mi)
- Highest elevation: 112 m (367 ft)
- Lowest elevation: 32 m (105 ft)
- Population (2023): 3,948
  - Density: 79.74/km^{2} (206.5/sq mi)
- Time zone: UTC+01:00 (CET)
  - Summer (DST): UTC+02:00 (CEST)
- INSEE/Postal code: 85046 /85310
- ^{1} French Land Register data, which excludes lakes, ponds, glaciers > 1 km^{2} (0.386 sq mi or 247 acres) and river estuaries.

La Chaize-le-Vicomte (French pronunciation: [la ʃɛz lə vikɔ̃t]) is a commune in the Vendée department in the Pays de la Loire region in western France.

== Geography ==
The river Yon forms part of the commune's northern border.

== Population ==
Historical population
Year	Pop.	±% p.a.
1968	2,037	—
1975	2,081	+0.31%
1982	2,218	+0.91%
1990	2,287	+0.38%
1999	2,443	+0.74%
2007	3,090	+2.98%
2012	3,501	+2.53%
2017	3,770	+1.49%
2023	3,948	+0.77%
Source: INSEE

== See also ==
- Communes of the Vendée department
