= Charles Theodore, Prince of Salm =

Count of Salm-Salm

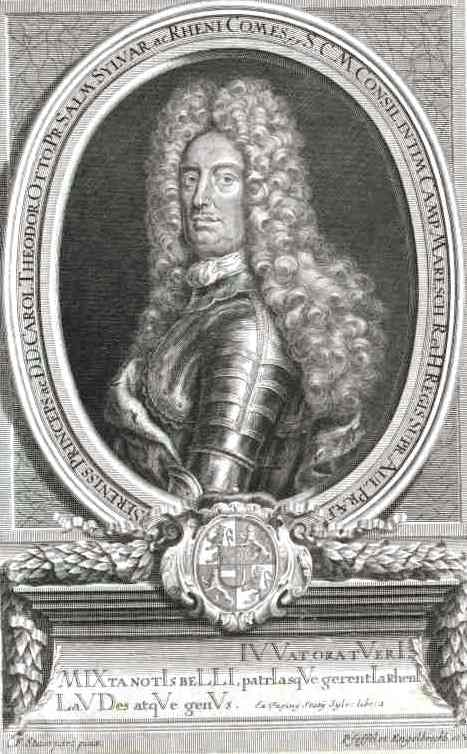
Carl Theodor Otto Fürst zu Salm

Charles Theodore Otto, Prince of Salm (German: Karl Theodor; 1645–1710), was Count of Salm-Salm since 1663 and Obersthofmeister at the Austrian Court.

== Family ==
He was the son of Leopold Philip Charles, Fürst (Prince) of Salm, and his wife, Maria Anna of Bronckhorst-Batenburg, a Dutch noblewoman from Gelderland. His paternal grandmother, Christina of Croÿ-Havré, was herself a granddaughter of Anna of Lorraine.

He married firstly Countess Godofreda Maria Anna of Huyn (1646–1667), heiress of the Counties of Geleen, Amstenrald and Wachtendonk. They had one daughter, Princess Maria Godefreda Dorothea of Salm (1667–1732), married to Leopold Ignaz Joseph, Prince of Dietrichstein.

After her death, Charles Theodore married Louise Marie von Simmern, daughter of Edward, Count Palatine of Simmern and Anne Gonzaga, on 20 March 1671. They had one son, Louis Otto, and three daughters. Éléonore von Salm, daughter of Charles Theodore, Prince of Salm became 1st Duchess of Ursel.

His living descendants include Prince Pedro, Duke of Calabria, Bernhard, Margrave of Baden and the Duke d'Ursel.

== Life ==
He studied in 1663 at the military academy in Paris and raised a regiment in 1667 and 1672.

He fought in the Siege of Maastricht (1673), and one year later against the French in the Battle of Seneffe.

In 1682 he joined the Imperial Army and fought against the Turks in the Battle of Vienna and the Siege of Buda (1684).

In 1685, Emperor Leopold I named him Obersthofmeister and in 1692 he became Konferenzrat.

He gained great influence at the Austrian court and encouraged several reforms. When Joseph I became Emperor in 1705, Carl Theodor Otto remained Obersthofmeister and First Geheimerat, which gave him powers equal to that of a Prime Minister. But he was more and more opposed by the successful and influential Field Marshal Prince Eugene of Savoy.

After Carl Theodor Otto caused a painful conflict with Pope Clement XI in 1709 over the city of Comacchio, he was encouraged to retire from service due to health problems. He died one year later.
