= Amaury IV de Craon =

Amaury IV of Craon
- Arms of Lord of Craon: Lozengy or and gules.
- Born: 16 August 1326
- Died: 30 May 1373 (aged 46)
- Buried: Church of Cordeliers, Angers
- Noble family: Craon family
- Spouse: Péronelle, Countess of Dreux
- Father: Maurice VII de Craon
- Mother: Marguerite de Mello

Amaury IV of Craon (16 August 1326 – 30 May 1373), Lord of Craon, Chantocé, Ingrandes, Briollé, Châteauneuf-sur-Sarthe, Précigné and Sablé, Sainte-Maure, Nouâtre, Pressigny and Marcillac, Châteauneuf-sur-Charente and Jarnac, was a French noble, who was part of the Hundred Years' War.

== Biography ==
Born on 16 August 1326, Croan was the son of Maurice VII de Craon and Marguerite de Mello. The Croan family held the hereditary office of Seneschal of Anjou and Maine.

He married in 1345 Péronelle, Viscountess of Thouars and Countess of Dreux, with whom he had no issue. He is known to have had two illegitimate children, Pierre, and Jeannette who married Thibaut de La Devillière.

Created royal lieutenant in 1347 by King Philip IV, Amaury was sent to Brittany with a small force and took La Roche-Derrien from the English in three days. In 1356, after being besieged at Romorantin in late August during the Chevauchée of the Black Prince, and ransomed, Amaury was taken prisoner at the Battle of Poitiers on 19 September. Craon became one of the main captains of King John II of France and becomes Captain for Touraine, Anjou, Maine and Lower Normandy. Amaury is later influenced by the Poitou lords who are favourable to King Edward III of England and eventually joins them at the head of the Anglo-Poitevin coalition, facing Bertrand du Guesclin who is attempting to regain Poitou on behalf of King Charles V of France.

right

— I know a Lord in this country who has got and conquered more knights, squires and others to serve him and to do his pleasure by his great courtesy in the time that he bare arms, than others did for money or for things. And it is my Lord of Craon [Amaury IV], who ought well to be honoured and to be praised for his courtesy above all other knights that I know. Know that he hath received from his courtesy much love and renomme of very great ladies and also of others, great and small., Geoffroy IV de la Tour Landry, The Book of the Knight of the Tower, 1371

Du Guesclin defeats the English garrisons at Bressuire, Poitiers, Châtellerault, Saint-Maixent-l'École, Fontenay-le-Comte then arrives in at Thouars in June 1372 with an army of thirty thousand soldiers. In addition to Amaury, the main leaders of the pro-English lords, Guillaume VII of Parthenay, Geoffroy d'Argenton, the Lords of Oyron and Airvault, Perceval de Coulanges are holed up within the fortifications of Thouars. The direct attack of the French army having failed, Du Guesclin brings siege engines to the walls of the city. A breach is opened in the walls but the besieged manage to repel the attackers. A suspension of the siege is concluded and if Thouars is not relieved by Saint-Michel the town would surrender to the French. The town capitulate and the leaders take the oath of fealty to Charles V.

Amaury died on 30 May 1373 and was buried in the church of Cordeliers, Angers.

== Sources ==
- Scott-Stokes, Charity; Given-Wilson, Chris, eds. (2008). Chronicon Anonymi Cantuariensis. Oxford University Press.
- Sumption, Jonathan (1990). The Hundred Years War: Trial by Battle. Faber and Faber.
