= Anne Gonzaga =

Anna Gonzaga
- Countess Palatine of Simmern
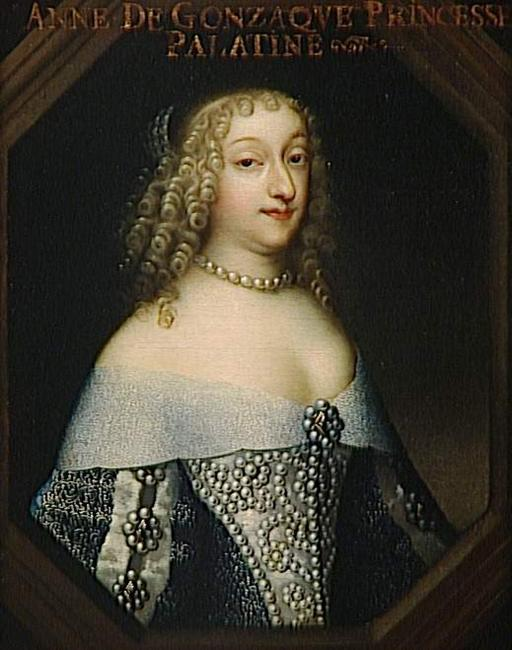
- Born: 1616; Paris, France
- Died: 6 July 1684 (aged 67–68); Paris, France
- Spouse: Edward of the Palatinate (m. 1645; died 1663)
- Issue Detail: Louise Marie, Princess of Salm; Anne Henriette, Princess of Condé; Bénédicte, Duchess of Brunswick-Lüneburg
Names
- French: Anne Marie (de) Gonzague; Italian: Anna Maria (di) Gonzaga
- House: Gonzaga
- Father: Charles Gonzaga
- Mother: Catherine of Lorraine

Anna Gonzaga (Anna Marie; 1616 – 6 July 1684) was an Italian French noblewoman and salonist. The youngest daughter of Charles Gonzaga, Duke of Mantua and Montferrat, and Catherine de Mayenne (herself daughter of Charles, Duke of Mayenne), Anna was "Princess Palatine" as the wife of Edward of the Palatinate, a grandson of King James I of England and uncle to King George I of Great Britain. She bore Edward three children, all daughters. Had Anna not converted Edward to Catholicism, the English throne might have passed to their descendants.

== Family and early life ==
Anna Marie de Gonzague was born in Paris into a cadet French branch of the ducal House of Gonzaga, which ruled Mantua in northern Italy. The Nevers branch later came to rule Mantua again after the War of the Mantuan Succession, triggered in part by her Parisian-born father's claim to the duchies of Mantua and Montferrat. With the promised support of the French crown, which naturally preferred a French peer to rule Mantua, Charles arrived there in January 1628 and proclaimed himself its sovereign.

Although her name and patriline was Mantuan (Italian), Anna de Gonzague (sometimes "Anna Gonzague de Clèves-Nevers", as the granddaughter of Henriette of Cleves, Duchess of Nevers) was born and lived mainly in France. She probably remained in France even after her father's reclamation of the ancestral city of Mantua, considering the town was in ruin by 1630 (marred by war, plague and a brutal sacking by the Imperial army).

Anna was the youngest of the Duke and Duchess of Mantua's six children. She had three brothers, including Charles II Gonzaga, and two sisters, the elder of whom became Queen Marie Louise Gonzaga of Poland. Her French mother, Catherine de Mayenne (who belonged to a junior branch of the royal House of Lorraine), died in 1618, when Anna was only about two years old. Originally her family planned for her to become a nun, but her father's death in 1637 relieved her of this obligation and thereafter Anna carried out an adventurous life.

== Duke of Guise ==
Anna fell passionately in love with her maternal second cousin Henry II, Duke of Guise; later, she claimed to have contracted a secret marriage with him in 1639, which he denied. In 1640, she disguised herself as a man to join him in Sedan, but he gave her up the following year, in 1641. She brought a lawsuit against him, demanding recognition as his wife.

== Marriage and children ==
Her husband, Count Palatine Edward of Simmern

On 24 April 1645 in Paris, Anne was married, without much enthusiasm, to Edward, Count Palatine of Simmern, a landless and penniless German nobleman who was nineteen years old - nine years her junior. She became Countess Palatine of Simmern, and was known in German as Pfalzgräfin Anne and in English as Anne, Princess Palatine.

With Edward, she had three daughters:

- Louise Marie
  - 23 July 1647 – 11 March 1679
  - married Charles Theodore, Prince of Salm
- Anne Henriette Julie
  - 13 March 1648 – 23 February 1723
  - married Henri Jules, Prince of Condé
- Bénédicte Henriette
  - 14 March 1652 – 12 August 1730
  - married John Frederick, Duke of Brunswick-Lüneburg
  - From her, such prominent figures as the doomed King Louis XVI are descended.

According to the Italian historian Signor G. B. Intra, Anne "held one of the most brilliant salons during the early years of the reign of Louis XIV."

Her second daughter's marriage to Henri Jules de Bourbon, duc d'Enghien, came to restore her position; Henri Jules, son of le Grand Condé, was a cousin of Louis XIV and one of the highest-ranking males at court. Her sister, Queen Ludwika Maria of Poland, had designated Anne Henriette as her heir and was committed to supporting Enghien for the Polish throne.

Princess Anne managed to marry her youngest daughter, Bénédicte (sometimes Benedicta or Benedictine), to the Duke of Brunswick and Hanover. The Princess Palatine was a confidante of Philippe d'Orléans, and helped arrange his second marriage (to her husband's nineteen-year-old niece Liselotte, Princess Palatine).

== Later life and religion ==
Anne's mother, Caterina of Mayenne, was a member of the "ultra-Catholic" House of Guise, and Anne appears to have been deeply devoted to the religion, especially in her later years. Besides being illegitimately descended from a pope, she was the granddaughter of Charles de Guise, head of the Catholic League of France, which his assassinated brother had formed. Anna managed to convert her Calvinist husband to Catholicism despite his mother, Elizabeth Stuart's threats to disown any of her children who became Catholic.

In 1663, Edward died in Paris aged 37. Forty-one years after his death, the son of Edward's younger sister Sophia of Hanover became King George I of Great Britain, the first of the House of Hanover. "If Sophia's elder brother Edward had not converted to Catholicism," writes George L. Williams, "it is possible that the English throne would have been held by his descendants."

In 1671, Anne Gonzaga rededicated herself to Catholicism and completely changed her lifestyle. She died in 1684. Bossuet delivered the famous oration at her funeral.

== Ancestry ==
Ancestors of Anne Gonzaga

8. Federico II Gonzaga, Duke of Mantua
4. Louis Gonzaga, Duke of Nevers
9. Margaret Paleologa
2. Charles I Gonzaga, Duke of Mantua
10. François I, Duke of Nevers
5. Henriette of Cleves
11. Margaret of Bourbon
1. Anna Gonzaga
12. Francis, Duke of Guise
6. Charles, Duke of Mayenne
13. Anna d'Este
3. Catherine of Mayenne
14. Honorat II, Marquis of Villars
7. Henriette, Marquise of Villars
15. Joan, Viscountess of Castillon

== Sources ==
- Spangler, Jonathan (2015). "Points of Transferral: Mademoiselle de Guise's Will and the Transferability of Dynastic Identity". In Geevers, Liesbeth; Marini, Mirella (eds.). Dynastic Identity in Early Modern Europe: Rulers, Aristocrats and the Formation of Identities. Ashgate Publishing. p. 131–152.
- Williams, George L. Papal Genealogy: The Families and Descendants of the Popes. Jefferson, North Carolina and London: McFarland, 2004. ISBN 0-7864-2071-5.

Court offices
Preceded by ?	Surintendante de la Maison de la Reine to the Queen of France; 1660–1661	Succeeded by Olympia Mancini, Countess of Soissons
