= John II of Dreux =

Arms of the Counts of Dreux

John II of Dreux (1265–7 March 1309), called John the Good, Count of Dreux and Braine, was the eldest son of Robert IV of Dreux and Beatrice, Countess of Montfort. In 1282, he succeeded as the Count of Dreux, Braine, Montfort-l'Amaury, and Joigny, and as Seigneur of Montpensier, St. Valery, Gamaches, d'Ault, and Dommart. In 1303, he also became Seigneur of Château-du-Loir and Louye-le-Dreux.

Robert fought with Philip IV of France in his wars in Flanders, including the sieges of Veurne, Cassel, de Bergues and Lille in 1297. He was at the Battle of the Golden Spurs (fought near Courtrai), where the French forces under Robert II of Artois suffered an unexpected defeat. In 1304, he fought at the Battle of Mons-en-Pévèle and served at the siege of Lille. He was chosen as one of the French ambassadors who negotiated an end to the war.

In 1306, he received the office of Grand Chamberman of France, which he held until his death.

== Marriage and children ==
John first married Jeanne of Montpensier (d. 1308). They had:

- Robert (1293–1329)
- John (1295–1331)
- Peter (1298–1345)

Having outlived Jeanne, John then married Perrenelle of Sully (d. after 9 January 1331) in 1308. They had:

- Joan (1309–c. 1355)

== Sources ==
- Denomy, A.J.; Bruckmann, J. (1959). "An Old French Poetic Version of the Life and Miracles of Saint Magloire". Mediaeval studies. XXI. Pontifical Institute of Mediaeval Studies: 53–128.
- Hillgarth, J. N. (1971). Ramón Lull and Lullism in fourteenth-century France. Oxford, UK: Clarendon Press.

Preceded by Robert IV	Count of Dreux; 1282–1309	Succeeded by Robert V
