= Edward, Count Palatine of Simmern =

German noble

Edward
- Born: 5 October 1625; The Hague, Dutch Republic
- Died: 10 March 1663 (aged 37); Paris, Kingdom of France
- Spouse: Anna Gonzaga (m. 1645)
- Issue: Luise Marie of the Palatinate; Anne Henriette, Princess of Condé; Benedicta Henrietta, Duchess of Brunswick-Lüneburg
- House: Palatinate-Simmern
- Father: Frederick V, Elector Palatine
- Mother: Elizabeth Stuart
- Religion: Catholicism, prev. Protestant

Edward, Prince Palatine of the Rhine (Eduard, Prinz von der Pfalz) (5 October 1625 – 10 March 1663), was the sixth son of Frederick V, Elector Palatine (of the House of Wittelsbach), the "Winter King" of Bohemia, by his consort, the English princess Elizabeth Stuart.

== Birth ==
Edward was born in The Hague, where his parents lived in exile after his father lost the Battle of White Mountain and was driven from the thrones of both Bohemia and the Palatinate. His father, a Calvinist, died on 29 November 1632, when Edward was seven years old.

== Marriage ==
On 24 April 1645, in Paris, Edward married a French princess of Italian extraction, Anne Gonzaga. Nine years older than Edward, she was a daughter of Carlo I, Duke of Mantua and Catherine de Lorraine-Guise-Mayenne. She had been raised in France, where her father held the dukedom of Nevers prior to inheriting the Italian duchy. She had raised a scandal by her obsessive pursuit of her second cousin, the fifth Duke of Guise, whom she claimed to have married (which he denied).

Edward had no money and was a Protestant, but Edward's prompt conversion vindicated the couple at the French royal court, despite his mother's threats to disown any of her children who embraced the Catholic Church. When her favorite child came to embrace the church, she wished as though she herself was dead.

The couple took up residence in Paris, where they were referred to as the Prince and Princess Palatine. Her inheritance and the king's generosity enabling them to live according to their rank as princes étrangers. Elizabeth soon resumed correspondence with her son. In 1649, he received the Order of the Garter from the exiled King Charles II of England.

== Children ==
Edward and Anna Gonzaga were parents of three daughters:

1. Luise Marie (23 July 1647 – 11 March 1679). Married Charles Theodore, Prince of Salm, had issue.
2. Anne Henriette (23 July 1648 – 23 February 1723). Married Henri Jules, Prince of Condé, had issue.
3. Benedicta Henrietta (14 March 1652 – 12 August 1730). Married John Frederick, Duke of Brunswick-Lüneburg, had issue.

== Death ==
Prince Edward died in Paris on 10 March 1663, aged 37.
