= Henri Jules, Prince of Condé =

Prince of Condé (1643–1709)

Henri Jules
- Duke of Guise

Prince of Condé
- Tenure: 11 November 1686 – 11 April 1709
- Predecessor: Louis II
- Successor: Louis III
- Born: 29 July 1643; Paris, Kingdom of France
- Died: 1 April 1709 (aged 65); Paris, France
- Spouse: Anne Henriette of the Palatinate (m. 1663)
- Issue: Marie Thérèse, Princess of Conti; Louis, Prince of Condé; Anne Marie, Mademoiselle de Condé; Louise Bénédicte, Duchess of Maine; Marie Anne, Duchess of Vendôme
Names
- Henri Jules de Bourbon
- House: Bourbon-Condé
- Father: Louis le Grand Condé
- Mother: Claire-Clémence de Maillé
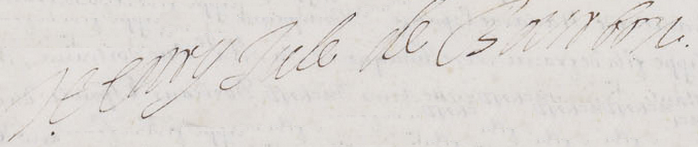
- Signature

Henri Jules de Bourbon (29 July 1643, in Paris – 1 April 1709, in Paris, also Henri III de Bourbon) was prince de Condé, from 1686 to his death. At the end of his life he suffered from clinical lycanthropy and was considered insane.

== Biography ==
Henri Jules was born to Louis II de Bourbon, "le Grand Condé" in 1643. He was five years younger than King Louis XIV. He was the sole heir to the enormous Condé fortune and property, including the Hôtel de Condé and the Château de Chantilly. His mother, Princess Claire-Clémence de Maillé-Brézé, was a niece of Cardinal Richelieu. He was baptised at the Église Saint-Sulpice, Paris on his day of birth. For the first three years of his life, while his father was duc d'Enghien, he was known at court as the duc d'Albret.

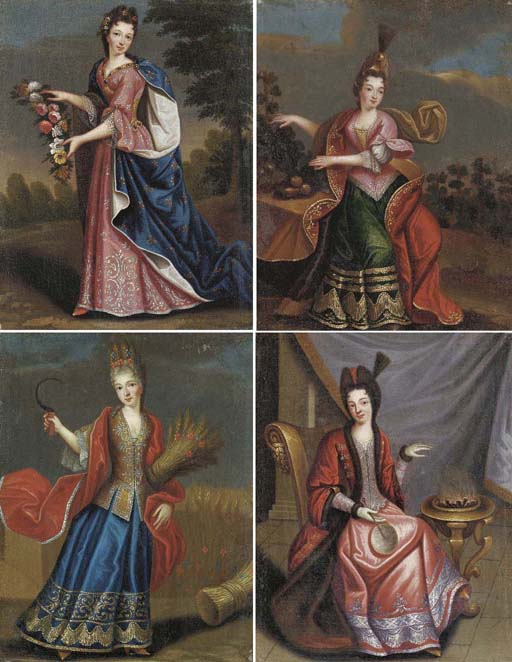
Henri Jules' four surviving daughters (portrait by Pierre Gobert)

Upon the death of his grandfather, he succeeded to his father's courtesy title of duc d'Enghien. As a member of the reigning House of Bourbon, he was born a prince du sang and styled as Monsieur le Duc.

=== Childhood and education ===
Because of his father's exile from France and fighting for Spain, Henri Jules spent much of his youth in the Spanish Netherlands where he was also beginning in 1652 when he was seven years old educated by Pierre Bourdelot who taught him Latin. The following year Henri Jules was enrolled in a Jesuit school in Namur to be taught alongside other children.

Throughout much of his life, Henri Jules was mentally unstable. His maternal grandmother Nicole du Plessis, sister to the Cardinal Richelieu had suffered from the belief that her bottom was made of glass and therefore refused to sit down. Henri-Jules' delusions manifested themselves in that he would imagine himself a dog and would bark like one.

He was a short, ugly, debauched, and brutal man not only "repulsive in appearance", but "cursed with so violent a temper that it was positively dangerous to contradict him". He was well educated but had a malicious character.

Trained as a soldier, in 1673 he was made official commander of the Rhine front, but in name only, as he lacked the military ability of his father. He also displayed a recklessness in battle and this lack of judgement made him as much a threat to his own troops as the enemy. His father would instead transfer his hopes on a worthy military successor for the Condé name on Henri-Jules cousin Francois-Louis.

Henri Jules was accorded the responsibility of governing the Condé estates, a task for which he proved to be much more suitable.

A possible bride considered for him at this time was his distant cousin, Élisabeth Marguerite d'Orléans, daughter of Gaston d'Orléans, but the marriage did not materialize.

=== Marriage ===
He eventually married the German princess Anne Henriette of Bavaria in the chapel of the Palais du Louvre in Paris in December 1663. The bride was the daughter of Edward, Count Palatine of Simmern and the political hostess Anna Gonzaga. The couple had ten children, only half of whom lived to adulthood. The young princess was noted for her pious, generous and charitable nature. Many at court praised her for her solicitude towards her disagreeable husband. Despite her good qualities, Henri Jules often beat his quiet wife during his rages.

In addition, he had an illegitimate daughter by Françoise-Charlotte de Montalais (1633-1718). The child was known variously as Julie de Bourbon, Julie de Gheneni (anagram of Enghien, aka de Guenani), or Mademoiselle de Châteaubriant. She was legitimised in 1693 at 25 years of age and was married to Armand de Madaillan de Lesparre, Marquis de Lassay, a member of her fathers entourage. She died on 10 March 1710, at age 43.

== Later life ==
Henri Jules mental instability worsened towards the later end of his life and he became convinced that he was already deceased and therefore he began taking his meals in an underground chamber which he was convinced was the home of M. de Turenne. He would also invite guests to this chamber to dine with him and pretend they were also dead and converse on the afterlife. while served by servants dressed in white sheets.

Though his contemporaries considered his actions being a symptom of his mental illness, it should however noted that he was a fervent Jansenist and as part of that belief included preparing for ones death through reflection and austerious living, and learning how to die well.

== Death ==
Henry Jules was succeeded by his only surviving son, Louis III de Bourbon, who only survived his father by a few months. Therefore the title passed to Henri Jules' grandson Louis-Henri.

== Ancestry ==
Ancestors of Henri Jules, Prince of Condé

8. Henri I, Prince of Condé
4. Henri II, Prince of Condé
9. Charlotte Catherine de La Trémoille
2. Louis II, Prince of Condé
10. Henri I, duc de Montmorency
5. Charlotte Marguerite de Montmorency
11. Louise de Budos
1. Henri Jules de Bourbon
12. Charles de Maillé, seigneur de Brézé
6. Urbain de Maillé, 1st Marquis of Brézé
13. Jacqueline de Thévalle
3. Claire-Clémence de Maillé-Brézé
14. François III du Plessis, seigneur de Richelieu
7. Nicole du Plessis de Richelieu
15. Suzanne de La Porte

== Issue ==
Name	Portrait	Lifespan	Notes
Marie Thérèse de Bourbon; Princess of Conti		1 February 1666 – 22 February 1732	Born in Paris and known as Mademoiselle de Bourbon in her youth, she married her cousin François Louis, Prince of Conti and had issue; she was briefly titular Queen of Poland in 1697.
Henri de Bourbon; Duke of Bourbon		5 November 1667 – 5 July 1670	Died in childhood.
Louis de Bourbon; Duke of Bourbon; Prince of Condé		10 November 1668 – 4 March 1710	Born in Paris, he became the heir apparent of his father on his brother's death in 1670; he married Louise-Françoise de Bourbon, légitimée de France a daughter of Louis XIV; the couple had issue.
Anne de Bourbon; Mademoiselle d’Enghien		11 November 1670 – 27 May 1675	Died in childhood.
Henri de Bourbon; Count of Clermont		3 July 1672 – 6 June 1675	Born at Saint-Germain-en-Laye and died at the age of two in Paris.
Louis Henri de Bourbon; Count of La Marche		9 November 1673 – 21 February 1677	Born in Paris, he died at the age of three in the same city.
Anne Marie Victoire de Bourbon; Mademoiselle d'Enghien; Mademoiselle de Condé		11 August 1675 – 23 October 1700	Born in Paris, she died at the age of 25 at the Château Asnières.
Anne Louise Bénédicte de Bourbon; Duchess of Maine		8 November 1676 – 23 January 1753	Born in Paris, she was known as Mademoiselle d’Enghien and then Mademoiselle de Charolais during her youth; she married a legitimised son of Louis XIV, Louis Auguste de Bourbon, duc du Maine; the couple had issue.
Marie Anne de Bourbon; Duchess of Vendôme		24 February 1678 – 11 April 1718	Born in Paris, she was known as Mademoiselle de Montmorency and then Mademoiselle d’Enghien during her youth; she married her cousin, Louis Joseph, Duke of Vendôme; the couple had no issue and Marie Anne died at the Hôtel de Vendôme.
N de Bourbon; Mademoiselle de Clermont		17 July 1679 – 17 September 1680	Born and died in Paris.

Henri Jules, Prince of Condé House of Bourbon-Condé Born: 29 July 1643 Died: 11 April 1709
French nobility
Preceded by Louis II	Prince of Condé; 11 November 1686 – 11 April 1709	Succeeded by Louis III
