= Marie Anne de Bourbon, Duchess of Vendôme =

Duchess of Vendôme (1678–1718)

Marie Anne de Bourbon
- Duchess of Vendôme; Duchess of Étampes
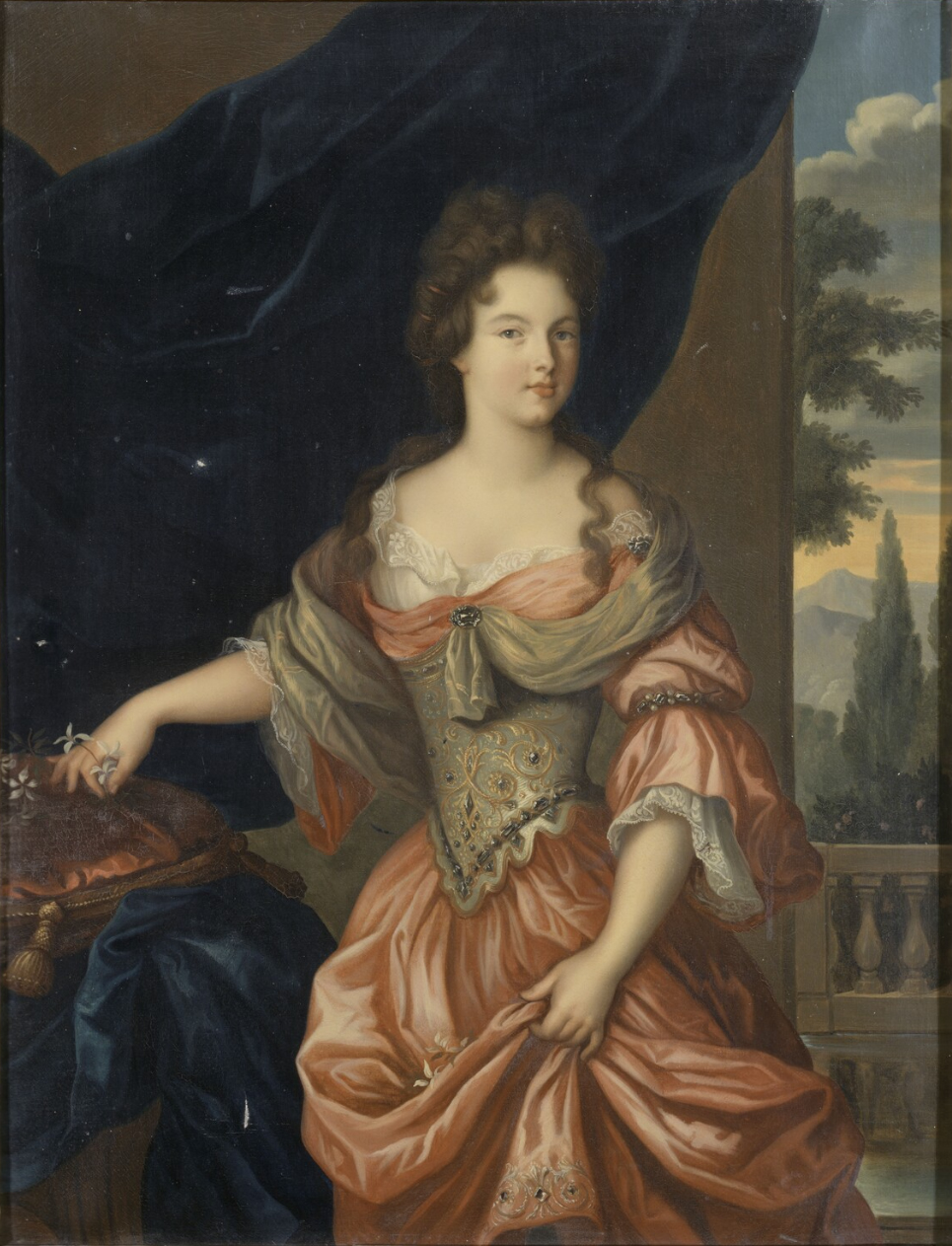
- Copy of an original portrait in the Château d'Eu
- Born: 24 February 1678; Hôtel de Condé, Paris, France
- Died: 11 April 1718 (aged 40); Hôtel de Vendôme, Paris, France
- Burial: Carmelite Convent of the Faubourg Saint-Jacques, Paris
- Spouse: Louis Joseph, Duke of Vendôme (m. 1710; died 1712)
- Father: Henri Jules, Prince of Condé
- Mother: Anne Henriette of Bavaria

Marie Anne de Bourbon (French pronunciation: [maʁi an də buʁbɔ̃]; 24 February 1678 – 11 April 1718) was the daughter of Henri Jules, Prince of Condé, and Anne Henriette of Bavaria. As a member of the reigning House of Bourbon, she was a Princesse du Sang. She was the duchesse de Vendôme by marriage. She was also the Duchess of Étampes in her own right.

== Biography ==
Born in Paris in 1678, she was the ninth child of her parents, and the youngest to survive infancy. In her youth she was known as Mademoiselle de Montmorency, a style derived from one of her grandfather's titles. Her father, the Duke of Bourbon and First Prince of the Blood, was the eldest surviving son of Louis, Grand Condé.

Marie Anne was born and lived at the Hôtel de Condé, Paris, where her father was abusive to her as well as her mother, Anne Henriette of Bavaria. He frequently beat them. Marie Anne was among the last of her many siblings to marry. In 1704, her father had wanted her to marry Ferdinand Charles, Duke of Mantua and Montferrat, but the proposal did not materialise and Ferdinand Charles instead married Suzanne Henriette de Lorraine known as Mademoiselle d'Elbeuf.

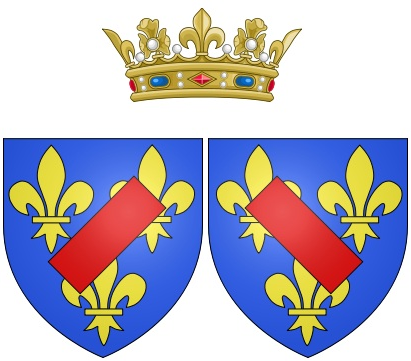
Coat of arms of Marie Anne de Bourbon as Duchess of Vendôme

With the help of her sister Louise Bénédicte, duchesse du Maine, and without the permission of their mother (their father and brother having died by this time), Marie Anne married her distant cousin, Louis Joseph, Duke of Vendôme, a great-grandson of Henry IV of France by his mistress Gabrielle d'Estrées. The couple wed on 21 May 1710 in the chapel of the Château de Sceaux, Louise Bénédicte's home. Although the dowager princesse de Condé was not informed of the marriage, she was present at the bedding ceremony at Sceaux along with Louis Henri, Duke of Bourbon; his wife Marie Anne de Bourbon; the dowager princess de Conti and her children the Louis Armand, prince de Conti and Mademoiselle de La Roche-sur-Yon. Also present were the Maine couple with their children Louis Auguste, Prince of Dombes and Louis Charles de Bourbon, comte d'Eu.

Two days after the marriage, Vendôme left his wife at Sceaux to retire to the château d'Anet. He left her the title and estates of the dukedom of Étampes. When she died, it went to her niece, Louise Élisabeth de Bourbon, princess of Conti. The marriage remained childless. Louis Joseph died in 1712. In 1714 Marie Anne began improvements and extensions to the Hôtel de Vendôme in Paris, where she died in 1718, aged 40. She was buried in the Carmelite Convent of the Faubourg Saint-Jacques, in Paris.

== References and notes ==
Marie Anne de Bourbon, Duchess of Vendôme House of Bourbon Born: 24 February 1678 Died: 11 April 1718
French nobility
Preceded by Louis Joseph, Duke of Vendôme	Duchess of Étampes; 1712–1718	Succeeded by Louise Élisabeth de Bourbon
