= Hôtel de Vendôme (boulevard Saint-Michel, Paris) =

Private mansion in Paris, France

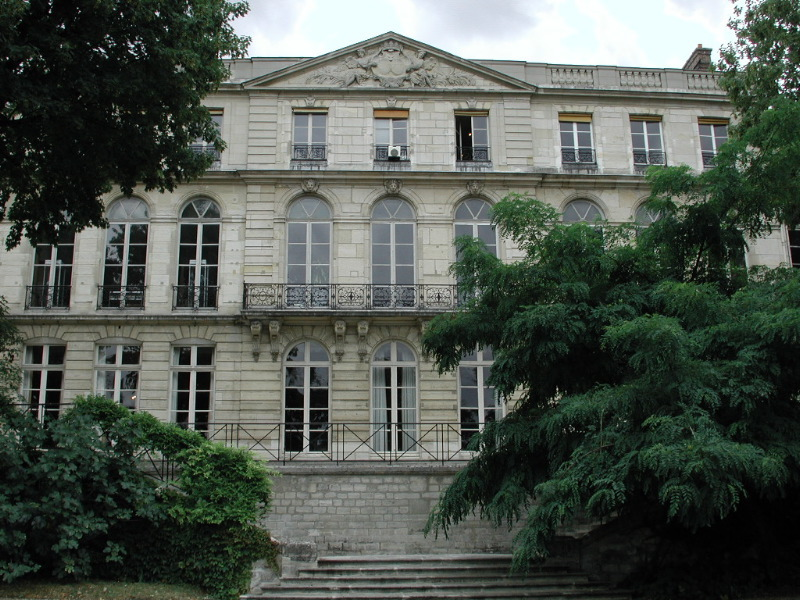
- The façade of the Hôtel de Vendome, Mines Paris – PSL

- Location within Paris

General information
- Location: Paris, France, 60 boulevard Saint-Michel
- Coordinates: 48°50′42.21″N 2°20′22.639″E
- Opening: 1707; 319 years ago
- Owner: State
- Management: Mines Paris – PSL

Design and construction
- Architect: Jean-Baptiste Alexandre Le Blond

The Hôtel de Vendôme (French pronunciation: [otɛl də vɑ̃dom]) is a private mansion in the 6th arrondissement of Paris.

== History ==
The Hôtel de Vendôme was built in 1707 by the architect Jean-Baptiste Alexandre Le Blond, rue d'Enfer (today boulevard Saint-Michel) for the Carthusian canon Antoine de La Porte. The plans were published by Augustin-Charles d'Aviler in 1710 in his Cours d'architecture under the title "Hôtel scis rue d'Enfer in Paris, occupied by M. le duc de Chaulnes et Batie on the designs of Sr le Blond".

Leased to the Duchess of Vendôme, the hotel was remodeled in 1715-1716 by the same architect, who modified the facade overlooking the garden and created a new avant-corps with the pediment of the old one.

In the middle of the 18th century, it was occupied, following a long lease, by the 5th Duke of Chaulnes, Michel Ferdinand d'Albert d'Ailly, who died there in 1769, and his wife. The duke kept part of his important library there also conducting scientific experiments there. Their son, the 6th Duke of Chaulnes, continued the lease, but did not live in the hotel. He sublet it until the Revolution and died in 1792. The hotel was then confiscated.

Adjoining the Luxembourg Gardens, onto which its rear façade overlooks, it has been the headquarters of the Mines Paris – PSL since 1815. It also houses the Musée de Minéralogie.

In the 19th century, it was expanded in two campaigns to make it a place of teaching and research:

- First between 1840 and 1852 by François-Alexandre Duquesney: extension of the building to the North and South, construction of the library, with cast iron pillars,...
- In 1854, the grand staircase was decorated with paintings by Hugard and in 1856 by Abel de Pujol.
- Then between 1861 and 1866 by Théodore-Henri Vallez, during the Haussmann's renovation of Paris (he built four wings around a central covered courtyard).

On January 21, 1926, the hotel was the subject of a first registration as a monument historique which was subsequently canceled, and on September 21, 1994, the 18th century mansion as well as the facades and roofs of the buildings of the 19th century are the subject of a new registration as monument historique.
