= List of consorts of Guise =

== Lady of Guise ==
=== Elder House of Guise, ?–1185 ===
Picture	Name	Father	Birth	Marriage	Became Consort	Ceased to be Consort	Death	Husband
	Ada of Roucy	Hildouin IV de Montdidier, Count of Roucy (Montdidier)	-					Geoffrey
	Adelinde de Montmorency	Bouchard III, Lord of Montmorency (Montmorency)	-					Guy I
	Adélaïde de Soupir	?	-					Bouchard II

=== House of Avesnes, 1185–1244 ===
Picture	Name	Father	Birth	Marriage	Became Consort	Ceased to be Consort	Death	Husband
	Margaret, Countess of Blois	Theobald V, Count of Blois (Blois)	1170	after 1200		11 July 1244 husband's death	12 July 1230	Walter III

=== House of Châtillon, 1244–1404 ===
Picture	Name	Father	Birth	Marriage	Became Consort	Ceased to be Consort	Death	Husband
	Alix of Brittany	John I, Duke of Brittany (Dreux)	6 June 1243	11 December 1254		28 June 1279 husband's death	2 August 1288	John I
	Beatrice of Flanders	Guy, Count of Flanders (Dampierre)	1270	1287	19/29 January 1291 husband's accession	1307 husband's death	after 1307	Hugh
	Margaret of Valois	Charles of Valois (Valois)	1295	6 October 1310		July 1342		Guy II
	Joan, Duchess of Brittany	Guy de Dreux, Count of Penthièvre (Dreux)	1319	4 June 1337	12 August 1342 husband's accession	1360 titles passed to daughter and son-in-law	10 September 1384	Charles

=== House of Valois-Anjou, 1404–1417 ===
Picture	Name	Father	Birth	Marriage	Became Consort	Ceased to be Consort	Death	Husband
	Yolande of Aragon	John I of Aragon (Barcelona)	11 August 1384	2 December 1400	12 November 1404 husband's accession	29 April 1417 husband's death	14 November 1442	Louis II

== Countess of Guise ==
=== House of Valois-Anjou, 1417–1425 ===
Picture	Name	Father	Birth	Marriage	Became Countess	Ceased to be Countess	Death	Husband
	Isabella, Duchess of Lorraine	Charles II, Duke of Lorraine (Lorraine)	1400	24 October 1420		1425; County ceased by the English and given to the House of Luxembourg	28 February 1453	René

=== House of Luxembourg, 1425–1472 ===
Picture	Name	Father	Birth	Marriage	Became Countess	Ceased to be Countess	Death	Husband
	Jeanne de Béthune, Viscountess of Meaux	Robert VIII de Béthune, Viscount of Meaux (Béthune)	1397	23 November 1418	1425 husband's ascension	5 January 1441 husband's death	end of 1449	Charles I
	Jeanne de Bar, Countess of Marle and Soissons	Robert of Bar, Count of Marle and Soissons (Scarponnois)	1415	16 July 1435	5 January 1441 husband's ascension	1444; Taken by the Crown and given back to the Valois-Anjou on the conditions that Louis' sister will marry Charles I as his consort.	14 May 1462	Louis I

=== House of Valois-Anjou, 1444–1481 ===
Picture	Name	Father	Birth	Marriage	Became Countess	Ceased to be Countess	Death	Husband
	Isabelle of Luxembourg	Peter of Luxembourg, Count of Saint-Pol (Luxembourg)	1458	May 1444		10 April 1472 husband's death	1472, or after	Charles I
	Jeanne de Lorraine	Frederick II of Vaudémont (Vaudémont)	1458	21 January 1474		25 January 1480		Charles II

Reverted to the Crown 1481–1491

=== House of Armagnac, 1491–1520 ===
None, although its only Count was betrothed to Françoise of Alençon

=== House of Guise, 1520–1528 ===
Picture	Name	Father	Birth	Marriage	Became Countess	Ceased to be Countess	Death	Husband
	Antoinette de Bourbon	Francis, Count of Vendôme (Bourbon-La Marche)	25 December 1493	9 June 1513	1520 title conferred by the Conference of Paris	1528; Became Duchess	22 January 1583	Claude

== Duchess of Guise ==
=== House of Guise, 1528–1688 ===
Picture	Name	Father	Birth	Marriage	Became Duchess	Ceased to be Duchess	Death	Husband
	Antoinette de Bourbon	Francis, Count of Vendôme (Bourbon-La Marche)	25 December 1493	9 June 1513	1528; Became Duchess	12 April 1550 husband's death	22 January 1583	Claude
	Anna d'Este	Ercole II d'Este (Este)	16 November 1531	29 April 1548	12 April 1550 husband's accession	24 February 1563 husband's death	17 May 1607	Francis
	Catherine of Cleves, Countess of Eu	Francis I, Duke of Nevers (De la Marck)	1548	4 October 1570		23 December 1588 husband's assassination	11 May 1633	Henry I
	Henriette Catherine, Duchess of Joyeuse	Henri de Joyeuse (Joyeuse)	8 January 1585	6 January 1611		30 September 1640 husband's death	25 February 1656	Charles
	Anna Maria Gonzaga	Charles I Gonzaga, Duke of Mantua (Gonzaga-Nevers)	1616	1639	30 September 1640 husband's accession	1641 divorce	6 July 1684	Henry II
	Honorée de Berghes, Countess of Bossut	Godefroy de Glymes, Comte de Grimberghe (Glymes)	-	11 November 1641		1643 divorce	August 1679	Henry II
	Élisabeth Marguerite d'Orléans, Duchess of Alençon and Angoulême	Gaston de France, Duke of Orléans (Bourbon)	26 December 1646	15 June 1667		30 July 1671 husband's death	17 March 1696	Louis Joseph

=== House of Wittelsbach, 1688–1723 ===
None

=== House of Bourbon, 1709–1830 ===
Picture	Name	Father	Birth	Marriage	Became Duchess	Ceased to be Duchess	Death	Husband
	Louise-Françoise de Bourbon, Légitimée de France	Louis XIV of France (Bourbon)	1 June 1673	25 May 1685	1 April 1709 husband's accession	4 March 1710 husband's death	16 June 1743	Louis
	Marie Anne de Bourbon	François Louis, Prince of Conti (Bourbon-Conti)	18 April 1689	9 August 1713		21 March 1720		Louis Henri
	Caroline of Hesse-Rotenburg	Ernest Leopold, Landgrave of Hesse-Rotenburg (Hesse-Rotenburg)	18 August 1714	24 July 1728		27 January 1740 husband's death	14 June 1741	Louis Henri
	Charlotte de Rohan	Charles, Prince of Soubise (Rohan)	7 October 1737	3 May 1753		4 March 1760		Louis Joseph
	Maria-Caterina di Brignole-Sale	Giuseppe Maria Brignole-Sale, Marquis of Groppoli (Brignole-Sale)	7 October 1737	24 October 1798		13 May 1818 husband's death	18 March 1813	Louis Joseph
	Bathilde d'Orléans	Louis Philippe I, Duke of Orléans (House of Orléans)	9 July 1750	24 April 1770	13 May 1818 husband's accession	10 January 1822		Louis Henri Joseph

Afterwards, the title was extinguished and no longer bestowed. It returned to the royal domain. Louis Henry though left his estate to his godson, Prince Henri, Duke of Aumale. He was bestowed with the personal title of Duke of Guise by Louis Philippe I, King of the French, his grandfather, in 1847.

== See also ==
- List of consorts of Maine
- List of Angevin consorts
- Duchess of Nemours
- Duchess of Lorraine
- Duchess of Mayenne
- Duchess of Aumale
- Duchess of Elbeuf
- Princess of Joinville
- Princess of Condé
- Duchess of Orléans
