= List of consorts of Mayenne =

== Lady of Mayenne ==
=== First House of Mayenne, ?–? ===
| Picture | Name | Father | Birth | Marriage | Became Consort | Ceased to be Consort | Death | Spouse |
|---|---|---|---|---|---|---|---|---|
| - | | | | | | | | Geoffroy I |
| - | | | | | | | | Juhel I |
| | Adeline? | - | | | | | | Gauthier I |

=== Second House of Mayenne, ?–1264 ===
| Picture | Name | Father | Birth | Marriage | Became Consort | Ceased to be Consort | Death | Spouse |
|---|---|---|---|---|---|---|---|---|
| | Mathilde d'Alluyes | Gauthier, Lord of Alluyes | - | before 1059 | ? husband's accession | after 1079 | | Geoffroy II |
| | Hildeberga of Cornouaille | Hoël II, Duke of Brittany (Cornouaille) | - | - | | May/December 1098 husband's death | - | Geoffroy II |
| | Adeline | - | - | - | May/December 1098 husband's accession | after 18 December 1116 husband's death | - | Gauthier II |
| | Clémence de Ponthieu | William III, Count of Ponthieu | - | before 1126 | | 23 December 1161 husband's death | 23/30 November, before 1189 | Juhel II |
| | Isabelle de Meulan | Waleran de Beaumont, Count of Meulan (Beaumont) | 1148 | 1161 | 23 December 1161 husband's death | 18 February/25 July 1169 husband's death | 10 May 1220 | Geoffroy III or IV |
| | Gervaise de Vitré, Viscountess of Dinan | Alain de Vitré, Lord of Dinan-Bécherel | - | before 1189 | | 12/26 April or 2/4 May 1220 husband's death | 1235/41 | Juhel III |

== Baroness of Mayenne ==
=== House of Avaugour, 1264–1331/4 ===
| Picture | Name | Father | Birth | Marriage | Became Baroness | Ceased to be Baroness | Death | Spouse |
|---|---|---|---|---|---|---|---|---|
| | Clémence de Beaufort, Dame de Dinan | Alain de Beaufort (Beaufort) | - | 1246 | before 1264 husband's accession | - | | Alain II d'Avaugour |
| | Marie de Beaumont | William of Beaumont, Count of Caserte (Beaumont) | - | - | | 27 September, before 1267 husband's death | - | Alain II d'Avaugour |
| | Marie de Beaumont-Brienne | Louis de Brienne, Viscount of Beaumont (Brienne) | - | 1270 | | 21 November 1301 husband's death | 18 March 1328 or 13 March 1339 | Henri III d'Avaugour |
| | Jeanne d´Harcourt | Jean II, Lord of Harcourt (Harcourt) | - | 1305 | | 1331 or l February 1334 husband's death | after 1346 | Henri IV d'Avaugour |

=== House of Dreux, 1331/4–1384 ===
- None

=== House of Châtillon, 1384–1481 ===
- None

=== House of Valois-Anjou, 1404–1481 ===
| Picture | Name | Father | Birth | Marriage | Became Baroness | Ceased to be Baroness | Death | Spouse |
|---|---|---|---|---|---|---|---|---|
| | Yolande of Aragon | John I of Aragon (Barcelona) | 11 August 1384 | 2 December 1400 | 12 November 1404 husband's accession | 29 April 1417 husband's death | 14 November 1442 | Louis II of Anjou |
| | Margaret of Savoy | Amadeus VIII, Duke of Savoy (Savoy) | 1410s or 7 August 1420 | 1424/31 August 1432 | | 12 November 1434 husband's death | 30 September 1479 | Louis III of Anjou |
| | Isabella, Duchess of Lorraine | Charles II, Duke of Lorraine (Lorraine) | 1400 | 24 October 1420 | 12 November 1434 husband's accession | 28 February 1453 | | René of Anjou |
| | Jeanne de Laval | Guy XIV de Laval, Count of Laval (Laval) | 10 November 1433 | 10 September 1454 | | 10 July 1480 husband's death | 19 December 1498 | René of Anjou |
| | Jeanne de Lorraine | Frederick II, Count of Vaudémont (Lorraine) | 1458 | 21 January 1474 | 10 July 1480 husband's accession | 25 January 1480 | | Charles IV, Duke of Anjou |

=== House of Lorraine, 1481–1544 ===
| Picture | Name | Father | Birth | Marriage | Became Baroness | Ceased to be Baroness | Death | Spouse |
|---|---|---|---|---|---|---|---|---|
| | Joan, Countess of Tancarville | William, Count of Tancarville (Harcourt) | - | 9 September 1471 | 10 décembre 1481 husband's accession | 1485 marriage annulled | 8 November 1488 | René II, Duke of Lorraine |
| | Philippa of Guelders | Adolf, Duke of Guelders (Egmond) | 9 November 1467 | 1 September 1485 | | 10 December 1508 husband's death | 26 February 1547 | René II, Duke of Lorraine |
| | Antoinette de Bourbon | Francis, Count of Vendôme (Bourbon-La Marche) | 25 December 1493 | 9 June 1513 | | 1544 elevated to Marquise | 22 January 1583 | Claude, Duke of Guise |

== Marquise of Mayenne ==
=== House of Lorraine, 1544–1573 ===
| Picture | Name | Father | Birth | Marriage | Became Marquise | Ceased to be Marquise | Death | Spouse |
|---|---|---|---|---|---|---|---|---|
| | Antoinette de Bourbon | Francis, Count of Vendôme (Bourbon-La Marche) | 25 December 1493 | 9 June 1513 | 1544 elevated from Baroness | 12 April 1550 husband's death | 22 January 1583 | Claude, Duke of Guise |
| | Anna d'Este | Ercole II d'Este (Este) | 16 November 1531 | 29 April 1548 | 12 April 1550 husband's accession | 24 February 1563 husband's death | 17 May 1607 | Francis, Duke of Guise |
| | Louise de Brézé, Lady of Anet | Louis de Brézé, seigneur d'Anet | 1518 | 1 August 1547 | 24 February 1563 husband's accession | 3 March 1573 husband's death | January 1577 | Claude, Duke of Aumale |

== Duchess of Mayenne ==
=== House of Lorraine, 1573–1621 ===
| Picture | Name | Father | Birth | Marriage | Became Duchess | Ceased to be Duchess | Death | Spouse |
|---|---|---|---|---|---|---|---|---|
| | Henriette of Savoy, Marquess of Villars | Onorato II di Savoia | 1541 | 6 August 1576 | | 3 October 1611 husband's death | 14 November 1611 | Charles II |
| | Marie Henriette Gonzaga | Louis Gonzaga, Duke of Nevers (Gonzaga) | 3 September 1571 | February 1599 | 3 October 1611 husband's accession | 3 August 1614 | | Henri |

=== House of Gonzaga, 1621–1654 ===
| Picture | Name | Father | Birth | Marriage | Became Duchess | Ceased to be Duchess | Death | Spouse |
|---|---|---|---|---|---|---|---|---|
| | Maria Gonzaga, Duchess of Montferrat | Francesco IV Gonzaga, Duke of Mantua (Gonzaga) | 29 July 1609 | 25 December 1627 | | 30 August 1631 husband's death | 14 August 1660 | Charles III |
| | Isabella Clara of Austria | Leopold V, Archduke of Austria (Habsburg) | 12 August 1629 | 7 November 1649 | | 1654 title sold to the Mazarin | 24 February 1685 | Charles IV |

=== House of Mazarin, 1654–1781 ===
| Picture | Name | Father | Birth | Marriage | Became Duchess | Ceased to be Duchess | Death | Spouse |
|---|---|---|---|---|---|---|---|---|
| | Charlotte Félicité de Durfort | - | - | 1685 | 9 November 1699 husband's death | 1730 | | Paul-Jules de la Porte |
| | Françoise de Mailly | - | 1688 | 1731 | | 1731 husband's death | 1742 | Paul-Jules de la Porte |
| | Louise Françoise de Rohan | Hercule Mériadec, Duke of Rohan-Rohan (Rohan) | 4 January 1695 | 1716 | 1731 husband's accession | 1738 husband's death | 27 July 1755 | Guy Jules Paul de la Porte |

- Due to various entailments, Louise-Jeanne could not pass on the title, which became extinct at her death. Her daughter, Louise-Félicité d'Aumont, married Honoré IV, Prince of Monaco, and their descendants still claim the title.

== See also ==
- List of consorts of Maine
- List of consorts of Anjou
- List of consorts of Elbeuf
- List of consorts of Lorraine
- List of consorts of Nevers
- List of consorts of Rethel
- List of Monegasque consorts
