= List of consorts of Maine =

This is a list of consorts of Maine, a former province of France.

Joan the Lame and Joan I, Countess of Auvergne, became Queen of France following the ascension of their husbands to the throne.

== Countess of Maine ==
=== First Creation ===
==== Rorgonid dynasty ====
| Picture | Name | Father | Birth | Marriage | Became Countess | Ceased to be Countess | Death | Spouse |
|---|---|---|---|---|---|---|---|---|
| | Adeltrude | – | – | | | | | Gauzlin I |
| | Bilichild | – | – | | | | | Rorgon I |
| | Rothilde | Charles the Bald (Carolingian) | 871 | 890 | – | | 928/29 | Roger |

==== Hugonid dynasty ====
| Picture | Name | Father | Birth | Marriage | Became Countess | Ceased to be Countess | Death | Spouse |
|---|---|---|---|---|---|---|---|---|
| | Bertha of Blois | Odo II, Count of Blois (Blois) | – | after 14 April 1046 | | 26 March 1051 husband's death | 11/13 April 1085 | Hugh IV |

- Disputed (1051–1069)

==== House of Este ====
| Picture | Name | Father | Birth | Marriage | Became Countess | Ceased to be Countess | Death | Spouse |
|---|---|---|---|---|---|---|---|---|
| | Eria of Hauteville | Robert Guiscard (Hauteville) | – | 1078 | | - repudiated | – | Hugh V |

==== House of Baugency ====
| Picture | Name | Father | Birth | Marriage | Became Countess | Ceased to be Countess | Death | Spouse |
|---|---|---|---|---|---|---|---|---|
| | Matilda of Château-du-Loir | Gervais, Lord of Château-du-Loir) | – | – | 1093 husband's accession | 10/25 March 1099 | | Elias I |
| In 1109, says Orderic Vitalis, Elias remarried to Agnes, the daughter of 'William of Poitou' and relict of Alfonso VI of Castile. This is perhaps confused, as the name and parentage match that of Alfonso's first wife, but she last appears thirty years earlier. It has been suggested that the true bride was Alfonso's widow Beatrice. | | | | | | | | Elias I |

==== House of Plantagenet ====
| Picture | Name | Father | Birth | Marriage | Became Countess | Ceased to be Countess | Death | Spouse |
|---|---|---|---|---|---|---|---|---|
| | Matilda of England | Henry I of England (Normandy) | 7 February 1101 | 17 June 1128 | | 7 September 1151 husband's death | 10 September 1167 | Geoffrey |
| | Philippa of Perche | Rotrou III, Count of Perche (Châteaudun) | It is possible but unlikely that his father left him the county of Maine; his elder brother, Geoffrey Plantagenet was ruler of Anjou, Maine and the Touraine. Elias revolted in 1145, but was captured and imprisoned indefinitely by his brother. John of Marmoutier, writing in the 1170s, states that Geoffrey released Elias, but that he died from a fever contracted during his incarceration. Few medieval sources name Elias as count of Maine. | | | | | Elias II |
| | Eleanor, Duchess of Aquitaine | William X, Duke of Aquitaine (Ramnulfid) | 1122 | 18 May 1152 | | 6 July 1189 husband's death | 1 April 1204 | Henry I |
| | Margaret of France | Louis VII of France (Capet) | November 1157 | 2 November 1160 | June 1170 husband's accession | 11 June 1183 husband's death | August/September 1197 | Henry II |
| | Berengaria of Navarre | Sancho VI of Navarre (Jiménez) | between 1165 and 1170 | 12 May 1191 | | 6 April 1199 husband's death | 23 December 1230 | Richard I |
| | Isabella of Angoulême | Aymer Taillefer, Count of Angoulême (Taillefer) | 1188 | 24 August 1200 | | 1203; France annexed Maine | 31 May 1246 | John |

=== Second creation ===
==== Capetian House of Anjou ====
| Picture | Name | Father | Birth | Marriage | Became Countess | Ceased to be Countess | Death | Spouse |
|---|---|---|---|---|---|---|---|---|
| | Beatrice of Provence | Raymond Berenguer IV of Provence (Barcelona) | 1234 | 31 January 1246 | 1247 husband's ascension | 23 September 1267 | | Charles I |
| | Margaret of Burgundy | Eudes of Burgundy, Count of Nevers and Auxerre (Burgundy) | 1250 | 18 November 1268 | | 7 January 1285 husband's death | 4 September 1308 | Charles I |
| | Maria of Hungary | Stephen V of Hungary (Árpád) | 1257 | May/June 1270 | 7 January 1285 husband's ascension | 1290 husband's death | 25 March 1323 | Charles II |

=== Third creation ===
==== House of Valois ====
| Picture | Name | Father | Birth | Marriage | Became Countess | Ceased to be Countess | Death | Spouse |
|---|---|---|---|---|---|---|---|---|
| | Joan the Lame | Robert II, Duke of Burgundy (Burgundy) | 24 June 1293 | July 1313 | | 1 April 1328 became Queen of France | 12 September 1348 | Philip I |

=== Fourth creation ===
==== House of Valois ====
| Picture | Name | Father | Birth | Marriage | Became Countess | Ceased to be Countess | Death | Spouse |
|---|---|---|---|---|---|---|---|---|
| | Bonne of Bohemia | John of Bohemia (Luxembourg) | 20 May 1315 | 6 August 1332 | | 11 September 1349 | | John II |
| | Joan I, Countess of Auvergne | William XII, Count of Auvergne (Auvergne) | 8 May 1326 | 13 February 1349 | | 22 August 1350 became Queen of France | 29 September 1360 | John II |

=== Fifth creation ===
==== House of Valois-Anjou ====
| Picture | Name | Father | Birth | Marriage | Became Countess | Ceased to be Countess | Death | Spouse |
|---|---|---|---|---|---|---|---|---|
| | Marie of Blois-Châtillon | Charles of Blois-Châtillon, Duke of Brittany (Châtillon) | 1343/5 | 9 July 1360 | | 20 September 1384 husband's death | 12 November 1404 | Louis I |
| | Yolande of Aragon | John I of Aragon (Barcelona) | 11 August 1384 | 2 December 1400 | | 29 April 1417 husband's death | 14 November 1442 | Louis II |
| | Margaret of Savoy | Amadeus VIII, Duke of Savoy (Savoy) | 1410s or 7 August 1420 | 1424/31 August 1432 | | 12 November 1434 husband's death | 30 September 1479 | Louis III |
| | Covella Ruffo | Carlo Ruffo, 5th Count of Montalto, 3rd Count of Corigliano (Ruffo) | c. 1400 | 1 March 1434 | 12 November 1434 husband's ascension | 1442 | | Charles IV |
| | Isabelle of Luxembourg | Peter of Luxembourg, Count of Saint-Pol (Luxembourg) | – | May 1444 | | 10 July 1480 husband's death | 1472, or after | Charles IV |
| | Jeanne de Lorraine | Frederick II of Vaudémont (Lorraine) | 1458 | 21 January 1474 | 10 July 1480 husband's ascension | 25 January 1480 | | Charles V |

=== Sixth Creation ===
==== House of Lorraine ====
| Picture | Name | Father | Birth | Marriage | Became Countess | Ceased to be Countess | Death | Spouse |
|---|---|---|---|---|---|---|---|---|
| | Henriette of Savoy, Marquess of Villars | Onorato II di Savoia | 1541 | 6 August 1576 | | 3 October 1611 husband's death | 14 November 1611 | Charles, Duke of Mayenne |
| | Marie Henriette Gonzaga | Louis Gonzaga, Duke of Nevers (Gonzaga) | 3 September 1571 | February 1599 | 3 October 1611 husband's accession | 3 August 1614 | | Henri, Duke of Mayenne |

== Duchess of Maine ==
=== Legitimised branch of the House of Bourbon, 1673–1736 ===
| Picture | Name | Father | Birth | Marriage | Became Duchess | Ceased to be Duchess | Death | Spouse |
|---|---|---|---|---|---|---|---|---|
| | Louise Bénédicte de Bourbon | Henri Jules, Prince of Condé (Bourbon (Condé branch)) | 8 November 1676 | 19 May 1692 | | 14 May 1736 husband's death | 23 January 1753 | Louis Auguste de Bourbon |

== See also ==
- List of consorts of Anjou
- List of consorts of Normandy
- List of consorts of Lorraine
- List of consorts of Provence
- List of consorts of Mayenne
