= Duke of Mayenne =

French noble title

Duke of Mayenne (French: duc de Mayenne) is a title created for a cadet branch of the House of Guise. It subsequently passed by marriage to the Gonzaga in 1621, who sold it to Cardinal Mazarin in 1654; he bestowed it on his niece, Hortense Mancini in 1661. Due to the terms of the entailment on the title, it became extinct in 1781, but it is still claimed by the Sovereign Prince of Monaco, a descendant of Hortense.

== Dukes of Mayenne ==
Coat of arms of the Dukes of Mayenne.

- Charles Ι de Lorraine (1573–1611), also known as Charles de Guise
- Henry of Lorraine (1611–1621)
- Charles II Gonzaga (1621–1631)
- Ferdinand Gonzaga (1631–1632)
- Charles III Gonzaga (1632–1654)
- Cardinal Mazarin (1654–1661)
- Hortense Mancini (1661–1699)
- Paul-Jules de La Porte (1699–1731)
- Guy-Paul-Jules de La Porte (1731–1738)
- Louise-Jeanne de Duras (1738–1781)

Due to various entailments, Louise-Jeanne could not pass on the title, which became extinct at her death. Her daughter, Louise-Félicité d'Aumont, married Honoré IV, Prince of Monaco, and their descendants still claim the title.

== See also ==
- List of consorts of Mayenne
- Mayenne
