= Battle of Fontaine-Française =

1595 battle during the French Wars of Religion

- Part of the French Wars of Religion
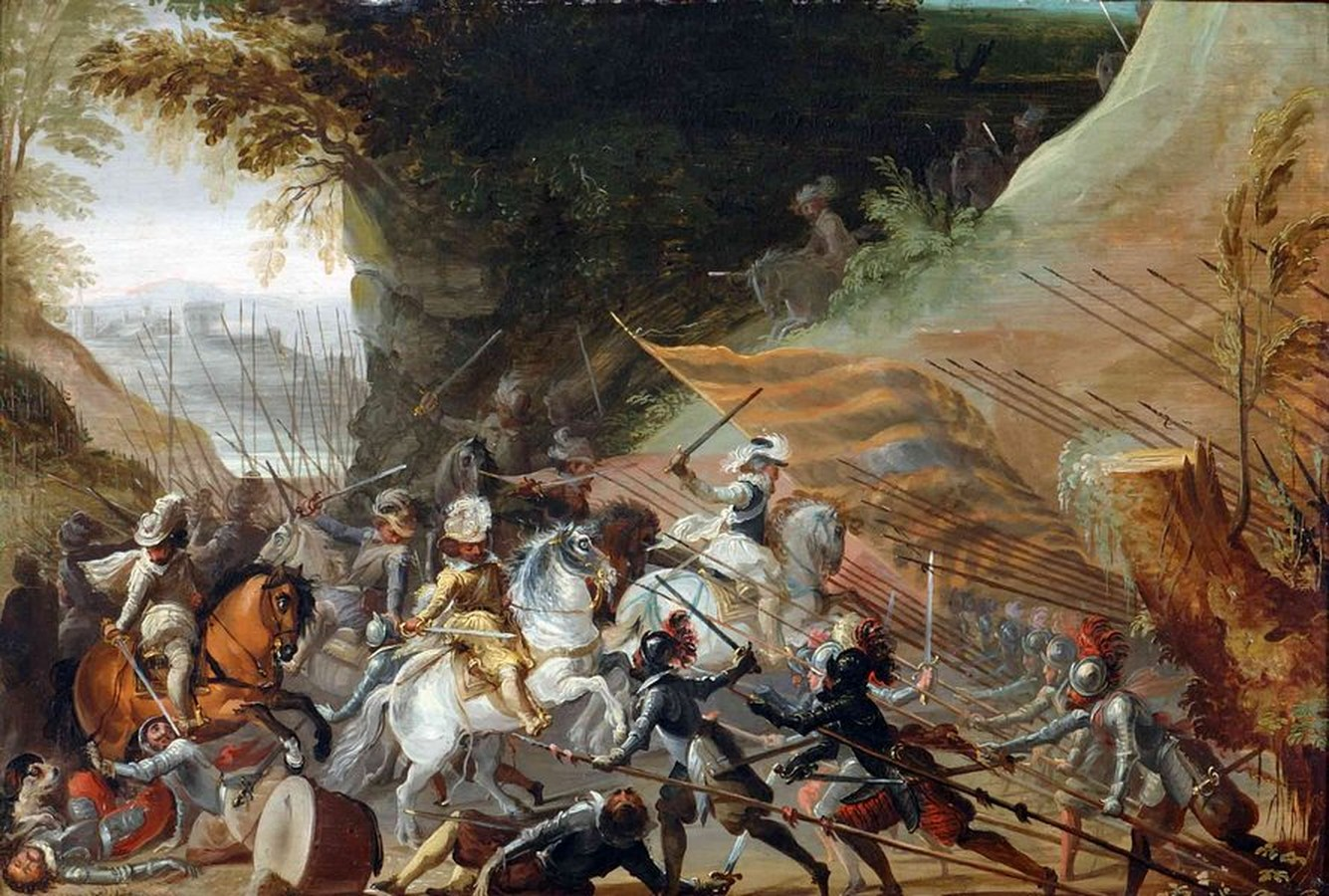
- 17th century painting at the Château de Pau
Date	5 June 1595
Location	Fontaine-Française, France
Result	French victory

Belligerents
French Royal Army	Spain; Catholic League

Commanders and leaders
Henry IV of France	Juan Fernández de Velasco; Charles of Lorraine, Duke of Mayenne

Strength
3,000 soldiers peasants	11,400–12,000 (Note: Spencer C. Tucker states Juan Fernández de Velasco crossed the Alps with 12,000 troops)

The Battle of Fontaine-Française occurred on 5 June 1595 between the French royal forces of King Henry IV of France and troops of Spain and the Catholic League commanded by Juan Fernández de Velasco and Charles of Lorraine, Duke of Mayenne, during the eighth and final war (1585–1598) of the French Wars of Religion.

== Background ==
In response to Henry IV's forces, led by Charles de Biron, taking Beaunne, Autun, and besieging Dijon, Juan Fernández de Velasco, 5th Duke of Frías, traversed the Alps with 2,000 horse and 8,000 foot soldiers in early June 1595. He joined the surviving members of the Catholic League, including 400 horse and 1,000 foot soldiers, led by Charles of Lorraine, Duke of Mayenne. They besieged and took Vesoul. Velasco and Mayenne then advanced toward Dijon intending to relieve the besieged city. Henry IV, hearing of their movements, quickly assembled 3,000 troops and hastened to Troyes.

== The battle ==
On 5 June, Henry narrowly avoided death near Fontaine-Francaise when he ran into a large contingent of Spanish horsemen, while conducting reconnaissance with 1,200 cavalry and 600 mounted arquebusiers. Henry charged right away and, after an intense struggle, was able to make his escape. The king then gathered his soldiers and the local peasantry on a hill, arming them with scythes and any other metal object that would catch sunlight, thus attempting to make his opponents believe he had a larger army. Fernández de Velasco, seeing reconnaissance forces rejoining Henry's main force, became convinced that Henry's forces had superior numbers, and decided to retreat.

== Aftermath ==
The French royal victory marked an end to the Catholic League, although the Wars of Religion would not come to a complete end until the signing of the Peace of Vervins on 2 May 1598, under which the Spanish ceded their remaining captured French towns.

== Bibliography ==
- Pitts, Vincent J. (2009). Henri IV of France: His Reign and Age. Johns Hopkins University Press.
- Tucker, Spencer C., ed. (2010). "1595-1596: Western Europe: France: Wars of Religion (continued)". A Global Chronology of Conflict: From the Ancient World to the Modern Middle East. Vol. Two: 1500-1774. ABC-Clio.
