= Marie of Blois, Duchess of Anjou =

French noblewoman (1345–1404)

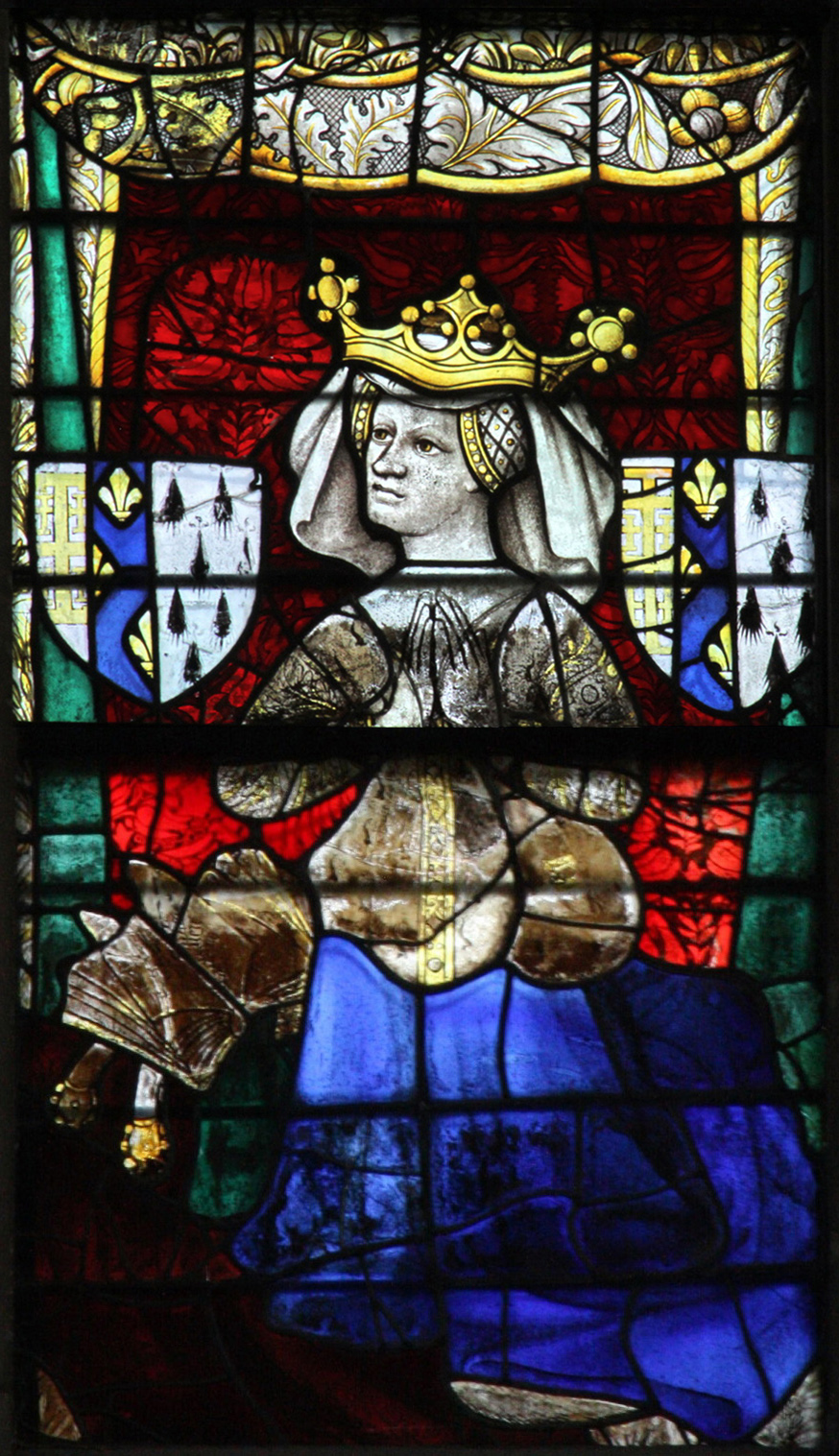
Marie of Blois, Duchess of Anjou

Marie of Blois (1345–1404) was the daughter of Joan, Duchess of Brittany and Charles of Blois, Duke of Brittany. Through her marriage to Louis I, Duke of Anjou, she became Duchess of Anjou, Countess of Maine, Duchess of Touraine, titular Queen of Naples and Jerusalem and Countess of Provence.

== Biography ==
Marie was the daughter of Joan of Penthièvre, Duchess of Brittany and Charles of Blois, Duke of Brittany. She married Louis I, son of John II of France, in 1360. Throughout their marriage his official titles increased, though he would never actually rule the Kingdom of Naples. After his death in 1384, most of the towns in Provence revolted against her son, Louis II. Marie pawned her valuables and raised an army.

She, her young son and the army went from town to town to gain support. In 1387 Louis II was formally recognized as Count in Aix-en-Provence. She then appealed to Charles VI of France to support her son in obtaining Naples. In 1390, Louis, supported by the pope and the French, set sail for Naples. Marie negotiated for a marriage between Louis and Yolande of Aragon, to prevent the Aragonese from obstructing him there.

They finally wed in 1400. Marie was an able administrator and on her deathbed revealed to Louis that she had saved the amount of 200,000 écus. This was to make sure that she could pay his ransom in case he was captured.

== Issue ==
With Louis I she had the following children:

- Marie (1370 – after 1383)
- Louis II of Anjou (1377 – 1417)
- Charles (1380 – 1404, Angers), Prince of Taranto, Count of Roucy, Étampes, and Gien

== Sources ==
- Bruel, François-L. (1905). "Inventaire de meubles et de titres trouvés au château de Josselin à la mort du connétable de Clisson (1407)". Bibliothèque de l'École des chartes (in French). 66 (66). Librairie Droz: 193–245. doi:10.3406/bec.1905.448236.
- Graham-Goering, Erika (2020). Princely Power in Late Medieval France: Jeanne de Penthièvre and the War for Brittany. Cambridge. ISBN 9781108489096.
- Potter, David (1995). A History of France, 1460-1560: The Emergence of a Nation State. St. Martin's Press.
- Rohr, Zita Eva (2016). Yolande of Aragon (1381-1442) Family and Power: The Reverse of the Tapestry. Palgrave Macmillan.
