= List of Angevin consorts =

The Countesses and Duchesses of Anjou were the wives of the ruling counts of Anjou and later the nominal French counts and dukes of Anjou.

== Countess of Anjou ==
=== First creation ===
==== House of Ingelger ====
Picture	Name	Father	Birth	Marriage	Became Countess	Ceased to be Countess	Death	Spouse
	Adelais d'Amboise	perhaps a Count Foulque brother-in-law of Adalard, Archbishop of Tours and Raino, Bishop of Angers (Amboise)	?	?	?	?	?	Ingelger
	Roscilla de Loches	Warnerius, seigneur de Loches	874	02 Mar 897	?	?	05 Jul 929	Fulk I
	Gerberge	?	?	937	942 husband's ascension	before 952		Fulk II
	? of Blois	Theobald the Ancient, Viscount of Blois (Blois)	?	954		960 husband's death	?	Fulk II
	Adele of Meaux	Robert of Vermandois, Count of Meaux (Carolingian-Vermandois)	?	965		974/982		Geoffrey I
	Adelaise de Chalon	?	925	March 979		21 July 987 husband's death	?	Geoffrey I
	Elisabeth de Vendôme	Bouchard I, Count of Vendôme (Bouchardides)	958	989		1000		Fulk III
	Hildegard de Metz	?	964	after 1000		21 June 1040 husband's death	1 April 1046	Fulk III
	Agnes of Burgundy	Otto-William, Count of Burgundy (Ivrea)	995	1 January 1032	21 June 1040 husband's ascension	1049/52 divorce	1068	Geoffrey II
	Grécie of Langeais	? (Langeais)	?	before 15 August 1052		? divorce	?	Geoffrey II
	Adele Le Teutonne	probably Odo II, Count of Blois	?	before 22 May 1060		? divorce	after 1062	Geoffrey II
	Grécie of Langeais	? (Langeais)	?	?		14 November 1060 husband's death	?	Geoffrey II
	Julienne de Langeais	Hamelin, seigneur de Langeais (Langeais)	?	before 1060	14 November 1060 husband's ascension	after 7 August 1067		Geoffrey III
	Hildegarde of Beaugency	Lancelin II, seigneur de Beaugency (Beaugency)	?	?	1068 husband's ascension	before 1070		Fulk IV
	Ermengarde de Bourbon-Dampierre	Archambaud IV, seigneur de Bourbon (Bourbon-Dampierre)	?	1070		before 1076 divorce	?	Fulk IV
	Orengarde de Châtelaillon	Isembard, seigneur de Châtel-Aillon (Châtelaillon)	?	1076		1080 divorce	?	Fulk IV
	Mantie de Brienne	Walter I, Count of Brienne (Brienne)	?	around 1080		1087 divorce	?	Fulk IV
	Bertrade de Montfort	Simon I, seigneur de Montfort (Montfort)	1070	1089		1092 abducted	14 February 1117	Fulk IV
	Eremburga, Countess of Maine	Elias I, Count of Maine (Beaugency)	1096	11 July 1110		15 January/12 October 1126		Fulk V

==== Plantagenets ====
Picture	Name	Father	Birth	Marriage	Became Countess	Ceased to be Countess	Death	Spouse
	Matilda of England	Henry I of England (Normandy)	7 February 1101	17 June 1128	before 2 June 1129 husband's ascension	7 September 1151 husband's death	10 September 1167	Geoffrey V
	Eleanor, Duchess of Aquitaine	William X, Duke of Aquitaine (Ramnulfid)	1122	18 May 1152		6 July 1189 husband's death	1 April 1204	Henry I
	Margaret of France	Louis VII of France (Capet)	November 1157	2 November 1160	June 1170 husband's accession	11 June 1183 husband's death	August/September 1197	Henry II
	Berengaria of Navarre	Sancho VI of Navarre (Jiménez)	between 1165 and 1170	12 May 1191		6 April 1199 husband's death	23 December 1230	Richard I

=== Second creation ===
==== Capetian House of Anjou ====
Picture	Name	Father	Birth	Marriage	Became Countess	Ceased to be Countess	Death	Spouse
	Beatrice of Provence	Raymond Berenguer IV of Provence (Barcelona)	1234	31 January 1246	1247 husband's ascension	23 September 1267		Charles I
	Margaret of Burgundy	Eudes of Burgundy, Count of Nevers and Auxerre (Burgundy)	1250	18 November 1268		7 January 1285 husband's death	4 September 1308	Charles I
	Maria of Hungary	Stephen V of Hungary (Árpád)	1257	May/June 1270	7 January 1285 husband's ascension	1290 husband's death	25 March 1323	Charles II

=== Third creation ===
==== House of Valois ====
Picture	Name	Father	Birth	Marriage	Became Countess	Ceased to be Countess	Death	Spouse
	Joan the Lame	Robert II, Duke of Burgundy (Burgundy)	24 June 1293	July 1313		1 April 1328 became Queen of France	12 September 1348	Philip I

=== Fourth creation ===
==== House of Valois ====
Picture	Name	Father	Birth	Marriage	Became Countess	Ceased to be Countess	Death	Spouse
	Bonne of Bohemia	John of Bohemia (Luxembourg)	20 May 1315	6 August 1332		11 September 1349		John II
	Jeanne I, Countess of Auvergne and Boulogne	William XII, Count of Auvergne and Boulogne (Auvergne)	8 May 1326	13 February 1350		22 August 1350 became Queen of France	29 September 1360	John II

=== Fifth creation ===
==== House of Valois-Anjou ====
Picture	Name	Father	Birth	Marriage	Became Countess	Ceased to be Countess	Death	Spouse
	Marie of Blois-Châtillon	Charles of Blois-Châtillon, Duke of Brittany (Châtillon)	1343/5	9 July 1360		before October in 1360 elevated to duchess	12 November 1404	Louis I

== Duchess of Anjou ==
=== First creation ===
==== House of Valois-Anjou ====
Picture	Name	Father	Birth	Marriage	Became Duchess	Ceased to be Duchess	Death	Spouse
	Marie of Blois-Châtillon	Charles of Blois-Châtillon, Duke of Brittany (Châtillon)	1343/5	9 July 1360	before October in 1360 elevated from a countess	20 September 1384 husband's death	12 November 1404	Louis I
	Yolande of Aragon	John I of Aragon (Barcelona)	11 August 1384	2 December 1400		29 April 1417 husband's death	14 November 1442	Louis II
	Margaret of Savoy	Amadeus VIII, Duke of Savoy (Savoy)	1410s or 7 August 1420	1424/31 August 1432		12 November 1434 husband's death	30 September 1479	Louis III
	Isabella, Duchess of Lorraine	Charles II, Duke of Lorraine (Lorraine)	c. 1400	24 October 1420	12 November 1434 husband's ascension	28 February 1453		René
	Jeanne de Laval	Guy XIV de Laval, Count of Laval (Laval)	10 November 1433	10 September 1454		10 July 1480 husband's death	19 December 1498	René
	Jeanne de Lorraine	Frederick II of Vaudémont (Lorraine)	1458	21 January 1474	10 July 1480 husband's ascension	25 January 1480		Charles IV

=== Second creation ===
==== House of Savoy ====
None

=== Third creation ===
==== House of Valois-Angoulême ====
None

=== Fourth creation ===
==== House of Valois-Angoulême ====
None

=== Fifth creation ===
Most dukes actually did marry but only after they ceased to be Dukes of Anjou because it was a tradition to award the son with the title of Duke of Orléans when they marry.

==== House of Bourbon ====
Picture	Name	Father	Birth	Marriage	Became Duchess	Ceased to be Duchess	Death	Spouse
	Marie Josephine Louise of Savoy	Victor Amadeus III of Sardinia (Savoy)	2 September 1753	16 April 1771		1790 ceased to be duchess	13 November 1810	Louis VIII

== See also ==
- List of consorts of Maine
- List of Norman consorts
- List of English consorts
- List of consorts of Provence
- List of consorts of Lorraine
- List of consorts of Sicily
- List of consorts of Naples
