= Henry of Lorraine, Duke of Mayenne =

Duke of Mayenne

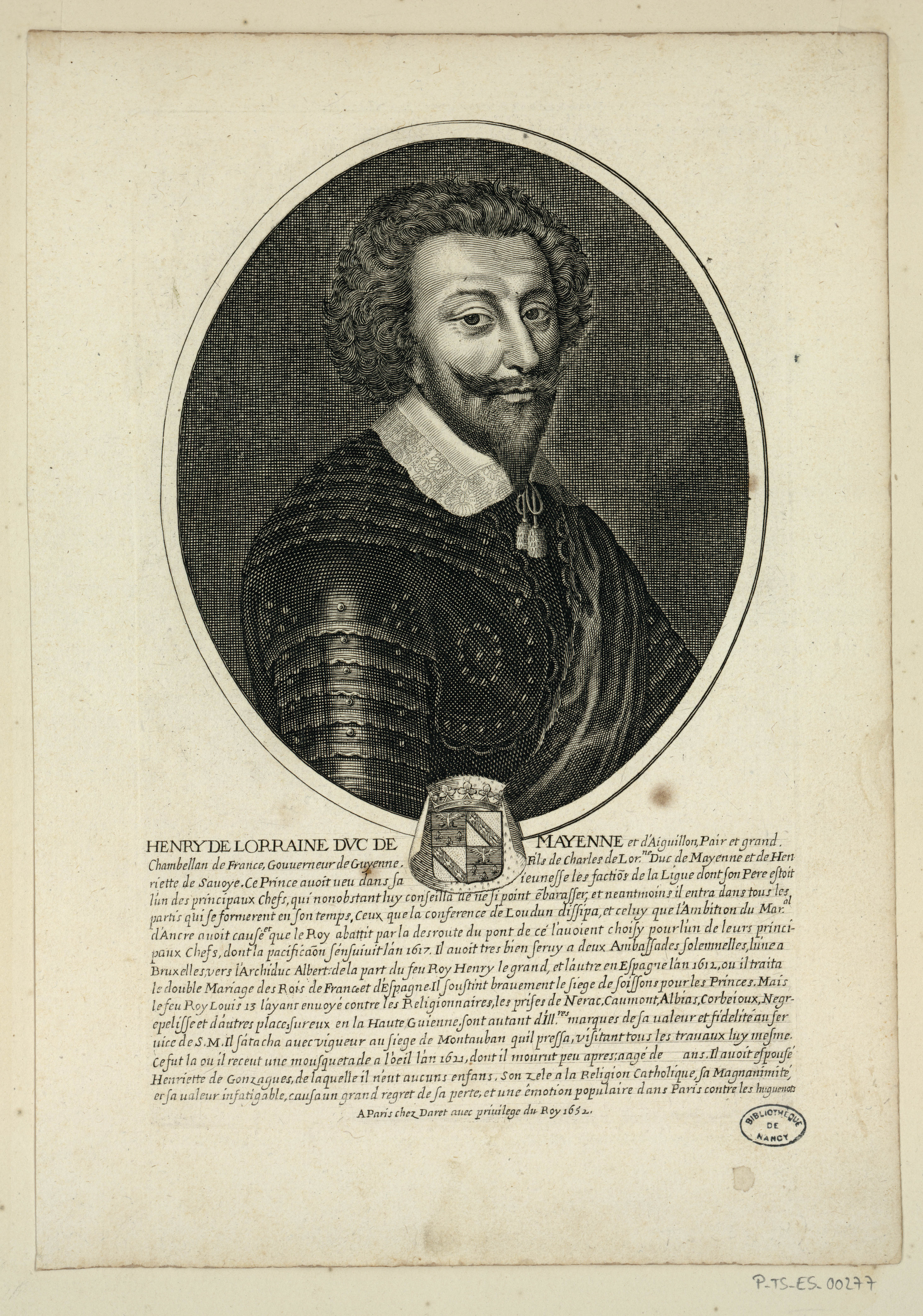
Portrait by Pierre Daret, 1652

Henry of Mayenne or Henry of Lorraine, (Dijon, 20 December 1578 – Montauban, 20 September 1621) was a French noble from the House of Lorraine and more particularly from the House of Guise.

He was the eldest son of Charles, Duke of Mayenne and Henriette of Savoy, Marquise of Villars.

He became Duke of Aiguillon in 1599 and in 1611, when his father died, Duke of Mayenne, Marquis de Villars, Count of Maine, Tende and Sommerive. He also became a peer of France and inherited the Hôtel de Mayenne in Paris.
He was also Grand Chamberlain of France.
He was present at the coronation of King Louis XIII.

In 1621, he was killed at the failed Siege of Montauban by a musket shot in the eye. He was buried in the church of Aiguillon.

He had married in Soissons in February 1599 with Henriette de Nevers (1571–1601), daughter of Louis Gonzaga, Duke of Nevers and Henriette of Cleves. They had no children.

He was succeeded by his sister's son Charles Gonzaga.

== Sources ==
- Parrott, David (1997). "A "prince souvereign" and the French crown: Charles de Nevers, 1580-1637". In Oresko, Robert; Gibbs, G. C.; Scott, H M (eds.). Royal and Republican Sovereignty in Early Modern Europe: Essays in Memory of Ragnhild Marie Hatton. Cambridge University Press. p. 149-187.

Preceded by Charles, Duke of Mayenne	Duc de Mayenne; 1611–1621	Succeeded by Charles Gonzaga
Preceded by Charles, Duke of Mayenne	Comte du Maine; 1611–1621	Succeeded by Charles Gonzaga
