= House of Bourbon-Maine =

Family

House of Bourbon-Maine (Légitimé de France)
- Parent house: House of Bourbon (legitimised royal branch)
- Country: France
- Founded: 1672; 354 years ago
- Founder: Louis-Auguste de Bourbon, duc du Maine
- Titles: duc du Maine, duc d'Aumale; duc de Gisors (1762); prince de Dombes, Prince d'Anet; comte d'Eu; comte de Dreux; baron de Sceaux
- Dissolution: 1775; 251 years ago

The House of Bourbon-Maine was a legitimate branch of the French House of Bourbon, being thus part of the Capetian dynasty. It was founded in 1672 when Louis-Auguste de Bourbon, duc du Maine was legitimised by his father, King Louis XIV.

== History and Founder ==
Louis-Auguste, founder of the House of Bourbon-Maine, was the first-born illegitimate son of Louis XIV and his mistress, Madame de Montespan.

Immediately after his birth in 1670, he was entrusted to the care of Madame Scarron, one of his mother's acquaintances, who brought him to a private house on the rue de Vaugirard, close to the Luxembourg Palace, in Paris. In 1672, the king legitimised him and other younger siblings he had fathered with Mme de Montespan. At the time of his legitimation, Louis-Auguste received the title of duc du Maine.

In 1692, Louis Auguste married Anne-Louise-Bénédicte de Bourbon-Condé, the daughter of Henry III Jules de Bourbon, prince de Condé.

== The Children of the duc du Maine ==
Louis-Auguste and his wife had seven children, only three of whom lived to adulthood. All died without issue.

- Mademoiselle de Dombes, (11 September 1694 – 15 September 1694);
- Louis Constantin de Bourbon, prince de Dombes, (Château de Versailles, 17 November 1695 – 28 September 1698);
- Mademoiselle d'Aumale, (1697 – 24 August 1699);
- Louis-Auguste de Bourbon, prince de Dombes, (château de Versailles, 4 March 1700 – 1 October 1755);
- Louis-Charles de Bourbon, comte d'Eu, (Château de Sceaux, 15 October 1701 – château de Sceaux, 13 July 1775);
- Charles de Bourbon, duc d'Aumale, (château de Versailles, 31 March 1704 – château de Sceaux, September 1708);
- Louise-Françoise de Bourbon, titled Mademoiselle du Maine, (château de Versailles, 4 December 1707 – Château d'Anet, 19 August 1743).

The House of Bourbon-Maine became extinct at the death of Louis Charles de Bourbon, comte d'Eu. It had been in existence for just over a century.

== Heads of the House ==
Descendant	Portrait	Birth	Marriages	Death
Louis Auguste de Bourbon, Légitimé de France; Duc du Maine; 1672–1736		31 March 1670; Château de Saint-Germain-en-Laye son of Louis XIV and Madame de Montespan	Anne Louise Bénédicte de Bourbon; Palace of Versailles; 19 May 1692; 7 children	14 May 1736; Château de Sceaux aged 66
Louis Auguste de Bourbon, prince de Dombes; 1736–1755		4 March 1700; Versailles son of Louis-Auguste de Bourbon, duc du Maine and Anne Louise Bénédicte de Bourbon	never married	1 October 1755; Fontainebleau aged 55
Louis Charles de Bourbon, comte d'Eu; 1755–1775		5 October 1701; Château de Sceaux son of Louis-Auguste de Bourbon, duc du Maine and Anne Louise Bénédicte de Bourbon	never married	13 July 1775; Château de Sceaux aged 73

== Ancestry ==
Ancestors of House of Bourbon-Maine

16. Antoine de Bourbon, Duke of Vendôme
8. Henry IV of France
17. Jeanne III of Navarre
4. Louis XIII of France
18. Francesco I de' Medici, Grand Duke of Tuscany
9. Marie de' Medici
19. Johanna of Austria
2. Louis XIV of France
20. Philip II of Spain
10. Philip III of Spain
21. Anna of Austria
5. Anne of Austria
22. Charles II of Austria
11. Margaret of Austria
23. Maria Anna of Bavaria
1. Bourbon du Maine
24. René de Rochechouart, Seigneur de Mortemart
12. Gaspard de Rochechouart, Marquis of Mortemart
25. Jeanne de Saulx de Tavannes
6. Gabriel de Rochechouart, Duke of Mortemart
26. Charles, Count of Maure
13. Louise de Maure, Countess of Maure
27. Diane de Pérusse des Cars, Princess of Carency
3. Françoise-Athénaïs, Marchioness of Montespan
28. Pierre de Grandsaigne, Seigneur of La Flotte
14. Jean de Grandseigne, Marquis of Marsillac
29. Françoise Baillard
7. Diane de Grandseigne
30. François de La Béraudière, Seigneur of Villechèze
15. Catherine de La Béraudière, Lady of Villenon
31. Anne Adrienne Frotier

== Other illegitimate houses ==
- Bourbon-Busset
- Bourbon-Penthièvre (extinct; cousins of the House of Bourbon-Maine through the duc du Maine's younger brother, the comte de Toulouse)
- Second house of Bourbon-Vendôme (extinct)

== See also ==
- Counts and Dukes of Maine
