= Louis Charles, Count of Eu =

French count; grandson of Louis XIV (1701–1775)

Louis Charles
- Count of Eu
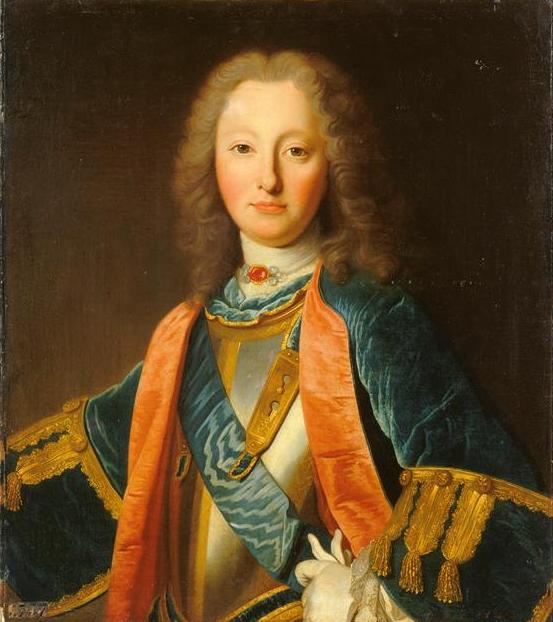
- Born: Louis Charles de Bourbon; 15 October 1701; Palace of Versailles, France
- Died: 13 July 1775 (aged 73); Château de Sceaux, France
- Burial: Église, Sceaux, France
Names
- Louis Charles de Bourbon
- House: Bourbon-Maine
- Father: Louis Auguste de Bourbon
- Mother: Louise Bénédicte de Bourbon

Louis Charles de Bourbon, Count of Eu (15 October 1701 – 13 July 1775) was a grandson of Louis XIV and his maîtresse-en-titre Madame de Montespan. He was the last member of the legitimised house of Maine branch of the House of Bourbon, a legitimised, cadet branch of the Capetian dynasty.

== Life ==
Born at his parents' château de Sceaux near Versailles on 15 October 1701, he was the youngest son of Louis Auguste de Bourbon, Duke of Maine, and his wife, Anne Louise Bénédicte de Bourbon.

He grew up with his elder brother, Louis Auguste de Bourbon, Prince of Dombes and his younger sister Louise Françoise de Bourbon (1707–1743), known as Mademoiselle du Maine.

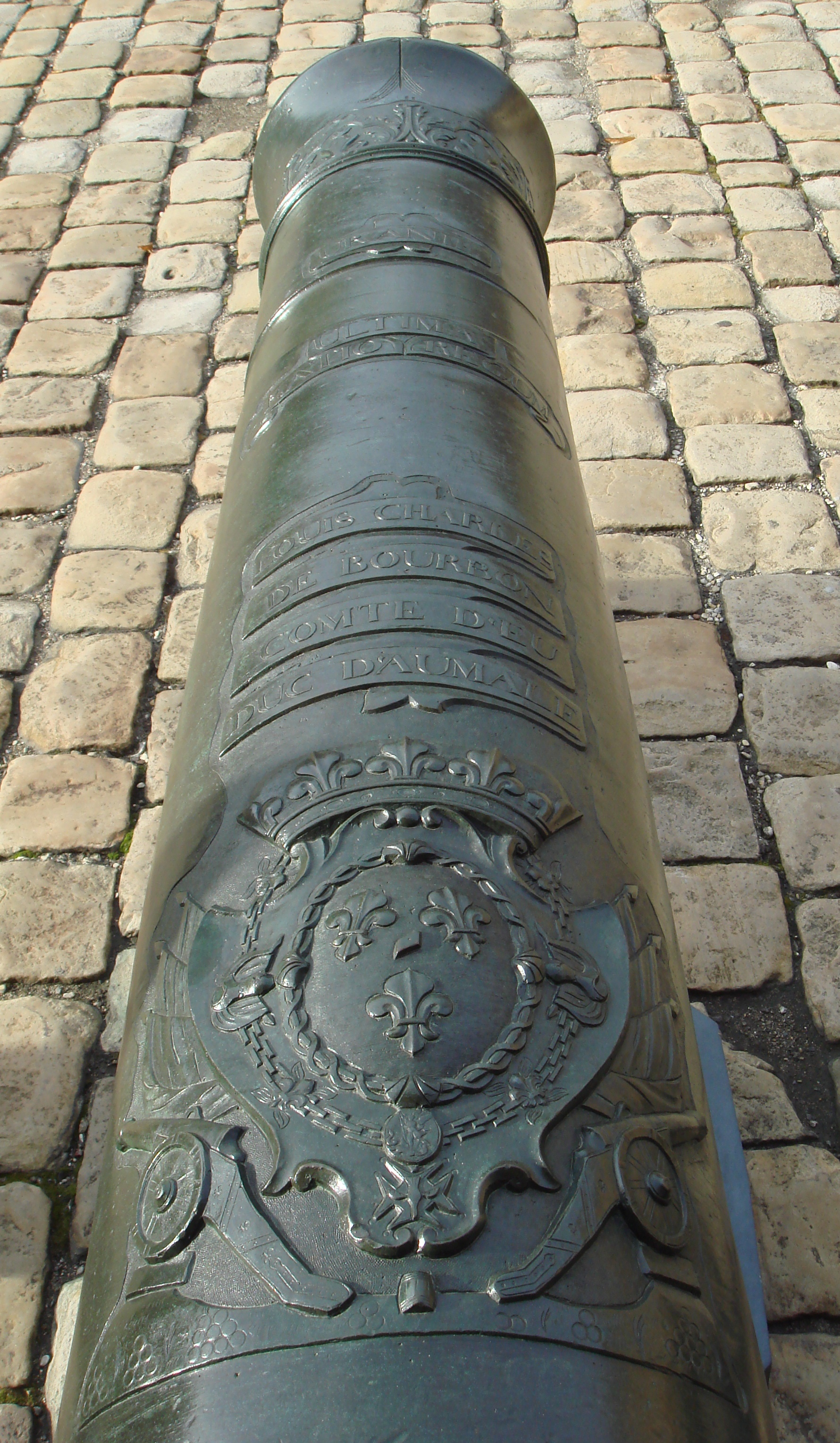
A de Vallière 24-pounder gun bearing the inscription "Louis Charles de Bourbon, comte d'Eu, duc d'Aumale".

Like his siblings he remained unmarried and childless all his life. On his father's death in 1736 he gained the title of Duke of Aumale. He was also made Grand Master of Artillery. a post that his father had also held.

His elder brother was their father's main heir, but after he died in 1755, Louis Charles inherited his estate. He was given his brother's governorship of Languedoc and inherited his many châteaux.

Like his elder brother he was little seen at court and preferred to hunt on his estate of the Château d'Anet.

In March 1762 he exchanged with Louis XV the principality of the Dombes for the dukedoms of Gisors and the estates of Gretz-Armainvilliers and Pontcarré.

Like his cousin, Louis Jean Marie de Bourbon, Duke of Penthièvre, Louis Charles was popular as a result of his charitable donations. In 1773 he offered to sell the dukedom of Aumale, countship of Eu and the estate of Anet to Louis XV for 12 million livres. (Note: This payment was never made as a result of the death of Louis XV in 1774; the lands were given back to Louis Charles and the deal was disregarded by Louis XVI. They were later inherited by the Duke of Penthièvre)

Louis Charles died at Sceaux at the age of 73 in October 1775. As he was childless, he made his younger cousin the Duke of Penthièvre, son of Louis Alexandre de Bourbon, Count of Toulouse, his heir.
