= List of governors of Languedoc =

This is the list of governors of Languedoc :

Languedoc was a former province of France, which existed until 1789.

- 1339–1345 : Jean de Marigny
- 1352–1357 : John I, Count of Armagnac
- 1357–1361 : Jean de Valois
- 1361–1361 : Robert de Fiennes
- 1361–1364 : Arnoul d'Audrehem
- 1364–1380 : Louis de Valois
- 1380–1380 : Gaston Phébus
- 1380–1390 : Jean de Valois (second time)
- 1390–1401 : Louis de Sancerre
- 1401–1411 : Jean de Valois (third time)
- 1411–1413 : Vacant
- 1413–1413 : Boucicaut
- 1413–1416 : Jean de Valois (fourth time)
- 1416–1419 : Vacant
- 1419–1420 : John I, Count of Foix
- 1420–1420 : dauphin Charles
- 1420–1424 : Charles I, Duke of Bourbon
- 1424–1425 : James II, Count of La Marche
- 1425–1436 : John I, Count of Foix (second time)
- 1436–1440 : Vacant
- 1440–1466 : Charles, Count of Maine
- 1466–1488 : John II, Duke of Bourbon
- 1488–1503 : Peter II, Duke of Bourbon
- 1503–1512 : Vacant
- 1512–1526 : Charles III, Duke of Bourbon
- 1526–1528 : Odet de Foix, Viscount of Lautrec
- 1528–1563 : Anne de Montmorency
- 1563–1614 : Henri I de Montmorency
- 1614–1632 : Henri II de Montmorency
- 1632–1633 : Henri de Schomberg
- 1633–1644 : Charles de Schomberg
- 1644–1660 : Gaston, Duke of Orléans
- 1660–1666 : Armand de Bourbon, Prince of Conti
- 1666–1682 : Henri, Duke of Verneuil
- 1682–1737 : Louis Auguste, Duke of Maine
- 1737–1755 : Louis Auguste, Prince of Dombes
- 1755–1775 : Louis Charles, Count of Eu
- 1775–1788 : Louis Antoine de Gontaut
