= Louis Auguste =

Louis Auguste may refer to:

- Louis Auguste, Prince of Dombes (1700–1755)
- Louis Auguste, Duke of Maine (1670–1736)
- Louis XVI (born Louis Auguste, 1754–1793), King of France
