= Louis Alexandre, Count of Toulouse =

French count; legitimized son of Louis XIV (1678–1737)

Louis Alexandre
- Légitimé de France; Comte de Toulouse
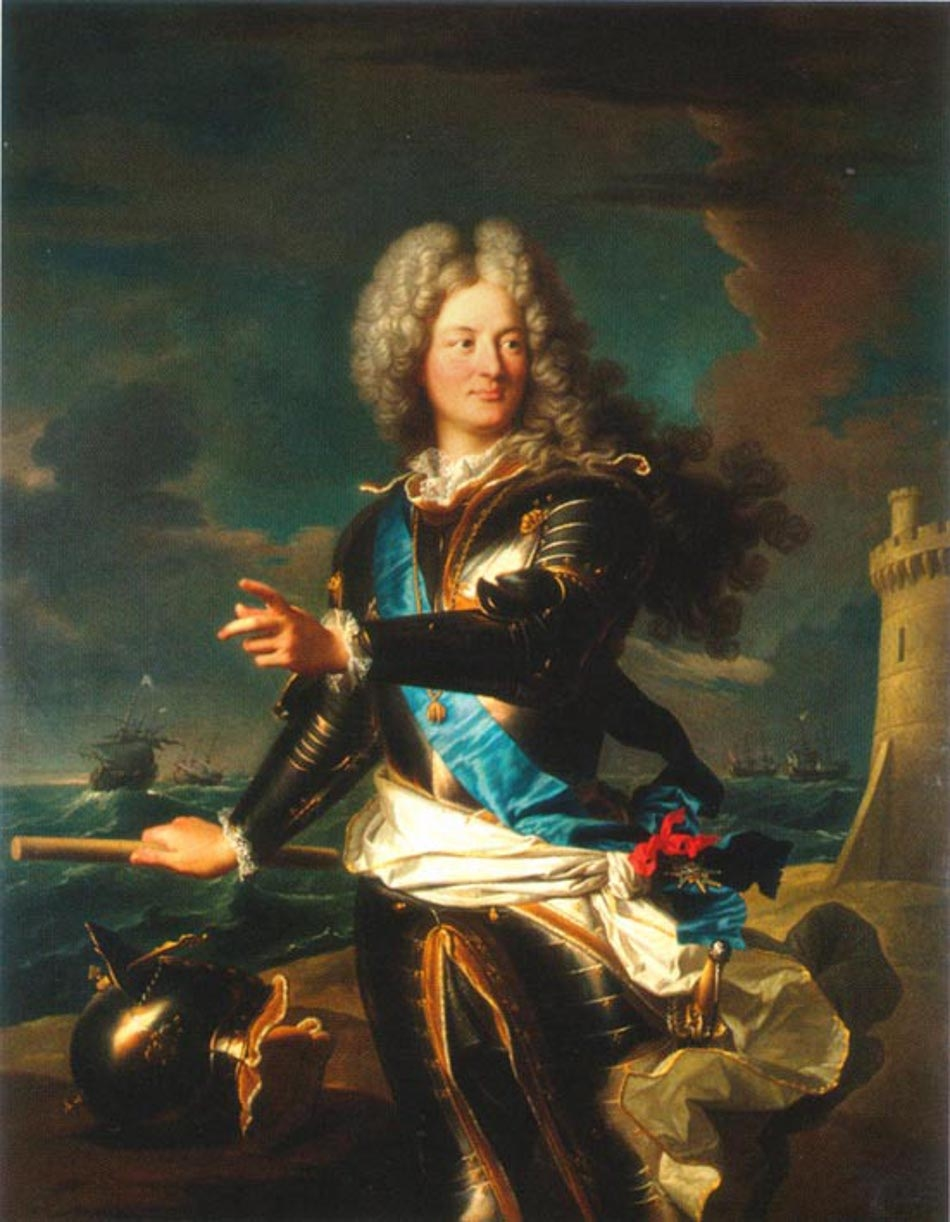
- Toulouse by Hyacinthe Rigaud, 1708
- Born: 6 June 1678; Versailles, France
- Died: 1 December 1737 (aged 59); Château de Rambouillet, France
- Burial: 25 November 1783; Chapelle royale de Dreux, France
- Spouse: Marie Victoire de Noailles
- Issue Detail: Louis Jean Marie, Duke of Penthièvre
- House: Bourbon
- Father: Louis XIV
- Mother: Madame de Montespan
- Coat of arms of Louis Alexandre, Count of Toulouse

Louis Alexandre de Bourbon (6 June 1678 – 1 December 1737), a legitimated prince of the blood royal, was the son of Louis XIV and of his mistress Françoise-Athénaïs, marquise de Montespan. At the age of five, he became grand admiral of France.

== Biography ==
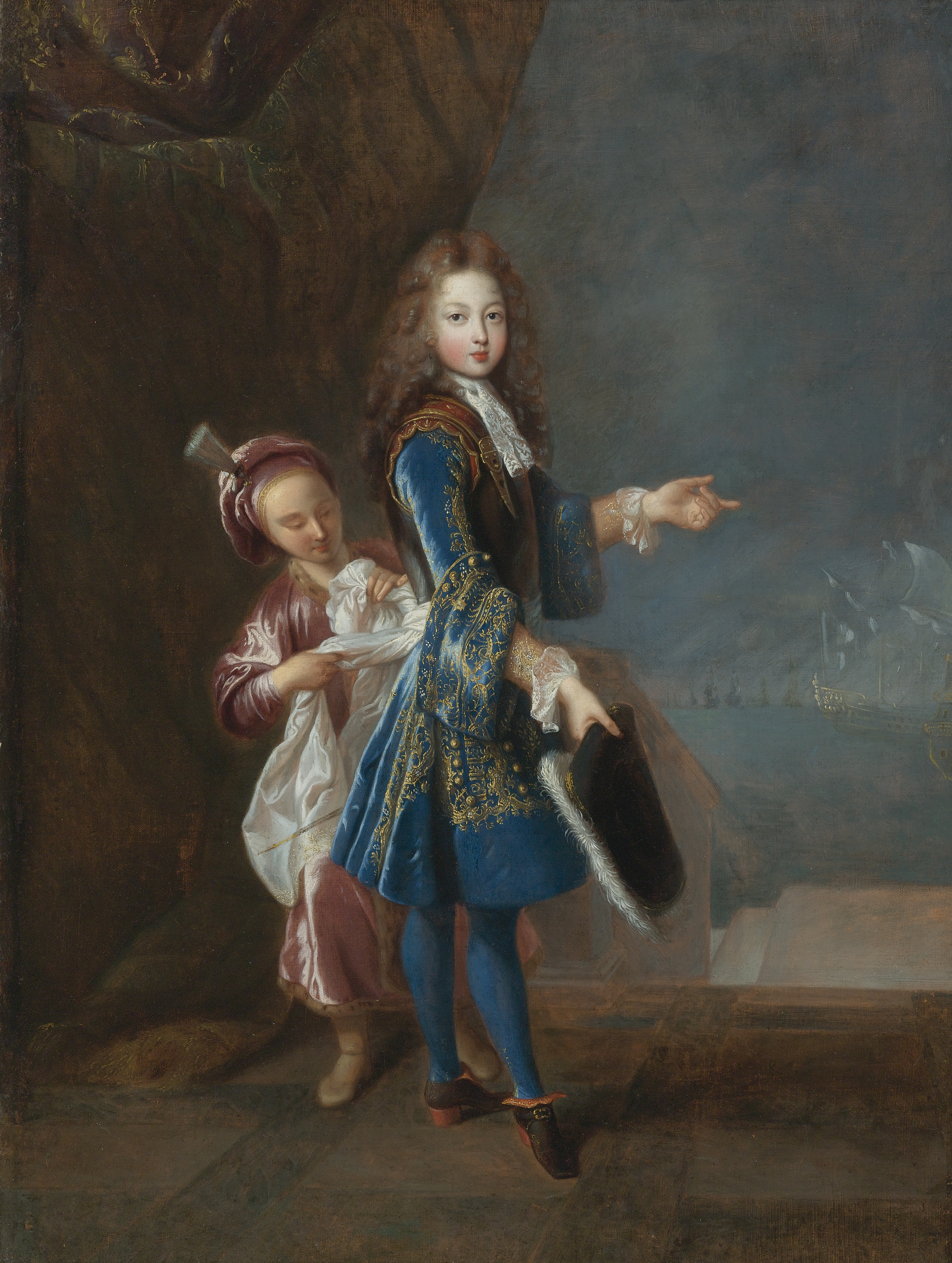
Louis Alexandre de Bourbon, by François de Troy, c. 1690s

Born at the Château de Clagny in Versailles, Louis Alexandre de Bourbon was the third son and youngest child of Louis XIV born out-of-wedlock with Madame de Montespan. At birth, he was put in the care of Madame de Montchevreuil along with his older sister Françoise-Marie de Bourbon.

Louis Alexandre was created Count of Toulouse in 1681 at the time of his legitimation, and, in 1683, at the age of five, grand admiral. In February 1684, he became colonel of an infantry regiment named after him and in 1693 mestre de camp of a cavalry regiment. During the War of the Spanish Succession, he was given the task of defending Sicily. In January 1689, he was named governor of Guyenne, a title which he exchanged for that of governor of Brittany six years later. On 3 January 1696, he was created a marshal of France, becoming commander of the royal armies the following year. During the War of the Spanish Succession he commanded the French fleet at the Battle of Vélez-Málaga in 1704.

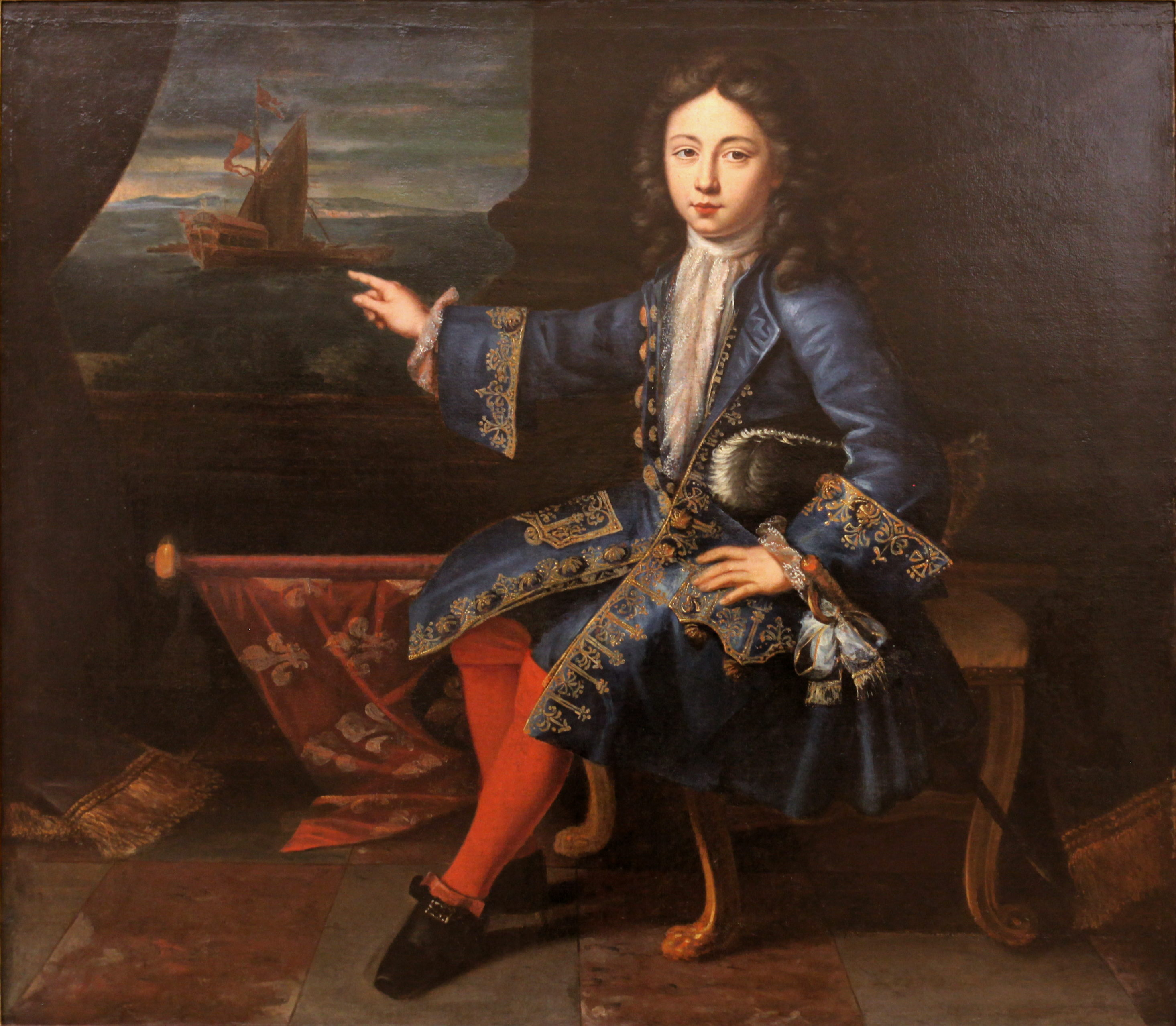
Portrait of Louis Alexandre, by Hyacinthe Rigaud, c. 1690

Though his father had legitimated him and his three surviving siblings, and even declared his two sons by Madame de Montespan fit to eventually succeed him to the throne of France, this was not to be, as immediately after Louis XIV's death the Parlement of Paris reversed the king's will.

Unlike his brother, Louis Auguste, Duke of Maine, who was barred from the regency council, Toulouse was not kept from a political role, and soon after, he was named (minister of the Navy), inheriting a seasoned staff headed by Joseph Pellerin. He remained in this capacity until being succeeded by Joseph Fleuriau d'Armenonville in 1722, the same Fleuriau d'Armenonville who had sold him the castle of Rambouillet in 1706.

The proposal of his marriage to Charlotte de Lorraine, Mademoiselle d'Armagnac, member of a cadet branch of the House of Guise had met with the categorical refusal of Louis XIV.

== Marriage ==
On 2 February 1723, the comte de Toulouse married Marie Victoire de Noailles, a daughter of the Anne Jules, duc de Noailles, in a private ceremony in Paris. She was the widow of Louis de Pardaillan de Gondrin (1688-1712), his nephew, son of his half-brother Louis Antoine de Pardaillan de Gondrin, whose mother was Madame de Montespan. The marriage was kept secret until the death of the regent.

== Court ==
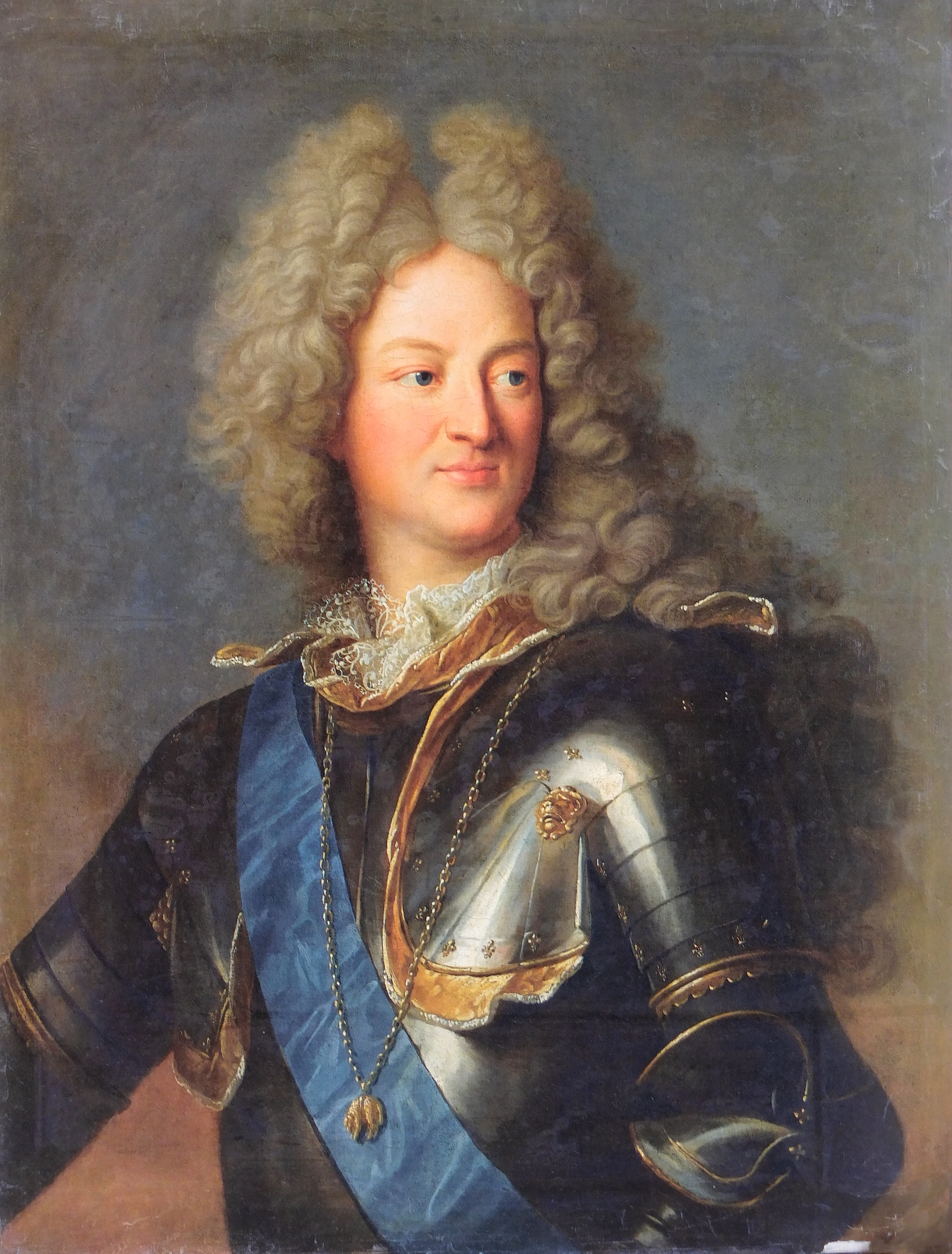
The Count of Toulouse, by the workshop of Hyacinthe Rigaud, c. 1708

He and his sisters tried to avoid the court and the intrigues of their brother, the duc du Maine, and his wife Anne Louise Bénédicte de Bourbon, the duchess, at the Château de Sceaux.

Shortly before his death in 1715, Louis XIV added a codicil to his will stating that if all legitimate members of the House of Bourbon, both those descended from Louis and more distant kinsmen, died out, the throne of France could be inherited by the duc du Maine and the comte de Toulouse. The decision was reversed after the death of Louis XIV when Louis Alexandre's cousin, Philippe II, Duke of Orléans, as the new regent, had the Parlement de Paris void that portion of the will.

The comte de Toulouse died at the Château de Rambouillet on 1 December 1737. He was buried in the village 12th century Saint-Lubin church. On 30 September 1766, the countess died at the Hôtel de Toulouse, the Parisian mansion not far from the Louvre which the count had bought from Phélypeaux, marquis de La Vrillière, in 1712. She too was buried in the family crypt in the Rambouillet church.

Upon the count's death, the duc de Penthièvre succeeded his father in his posts and titles. Because of the marriage of Mademoiselle de Penthièvre to Louis Philippe II, Duke of Orléans, the comte de Toulouse is an ancestor of the modern House of Orléans, which also descends from Toulouse's two surviving full sisters.

== Ancestry ==
Ancestors of Louis Alexandre, Count of Toulouse

8. Henry IV of France
4. Louis XIII of France
9. Marie de' Medici
2. Louis XIV of France
10. Philip III of Spain
5. Anne of Austria
11. Margaret of Austria
1. Louis Alexandre, Count of Toulouse
12. Gaspard de Rochechouart, marquis de Mortemart
6. Gabriel de Rochechouart, duc de Mortemart
13. Louise, comtesse de Maure
3. Madame de Montespan
14. Jean de Grandseigne, marquis de Marsillac
7. Diane de Grandseigne
15. Catherine de La Béraudière, dame de Villenon

== Notes ==
Louis Alexandre, Count of Toulouse House of Bourbon Born: 6 June 1678 Died: 1 December 1737
French nobility
Preceded by New Creation	Comte de Toulouse; 1681–1737	Succeeded by Louis Jean Marie de Bourbon, duc de Penthièvre
Preceded by Marie Anne de Bourbon	Duc de Penthièvre; 1697–1737	Succeeded by Louis Jean Marie de Bourbon, duc de Penthièvre
Preceded by New Creation	Duc de Châteauvillain; 1703–1737	Succeeded by Louis Jean Marie de Bourbon, duc de Penthièvre
Preceded by New Creation	Duc de Damville; 1711–1719	Succeeded by Louis Jean Marie de Bourbon, duc de Penthièvre
Preceded by Philippe de Bourbon-Vendôme	Duc de Vendôme; 1712–1737	Succeeded by Louis Stanislas, Count of Provence
Preceded by New Creation	Duc d'Arc; 1711–1737	Succeeded by Louis Jean Marie de Bourbon, duc de Penthièvre
Political offices
Preceded by Jérôme Phélypeaux, comte de Pontchartrain	Minister of the Navy; 1683–1737	Succeeded by Louis Jean Marie de Bourbon, duc de Penthièvre
Preceded by Louis de Bourbon, comte de Vermandois	Admiral of France; 1683–1737	Succeeded by Louis Jean Marie de Bourbon, duc de Penthièvre
