= Louise Françoise de Bourbon, Mademoiselle du Maine =

French noble; granddaughter of Louis XIV

Louise Françoise
- Mademoiselle du Maine
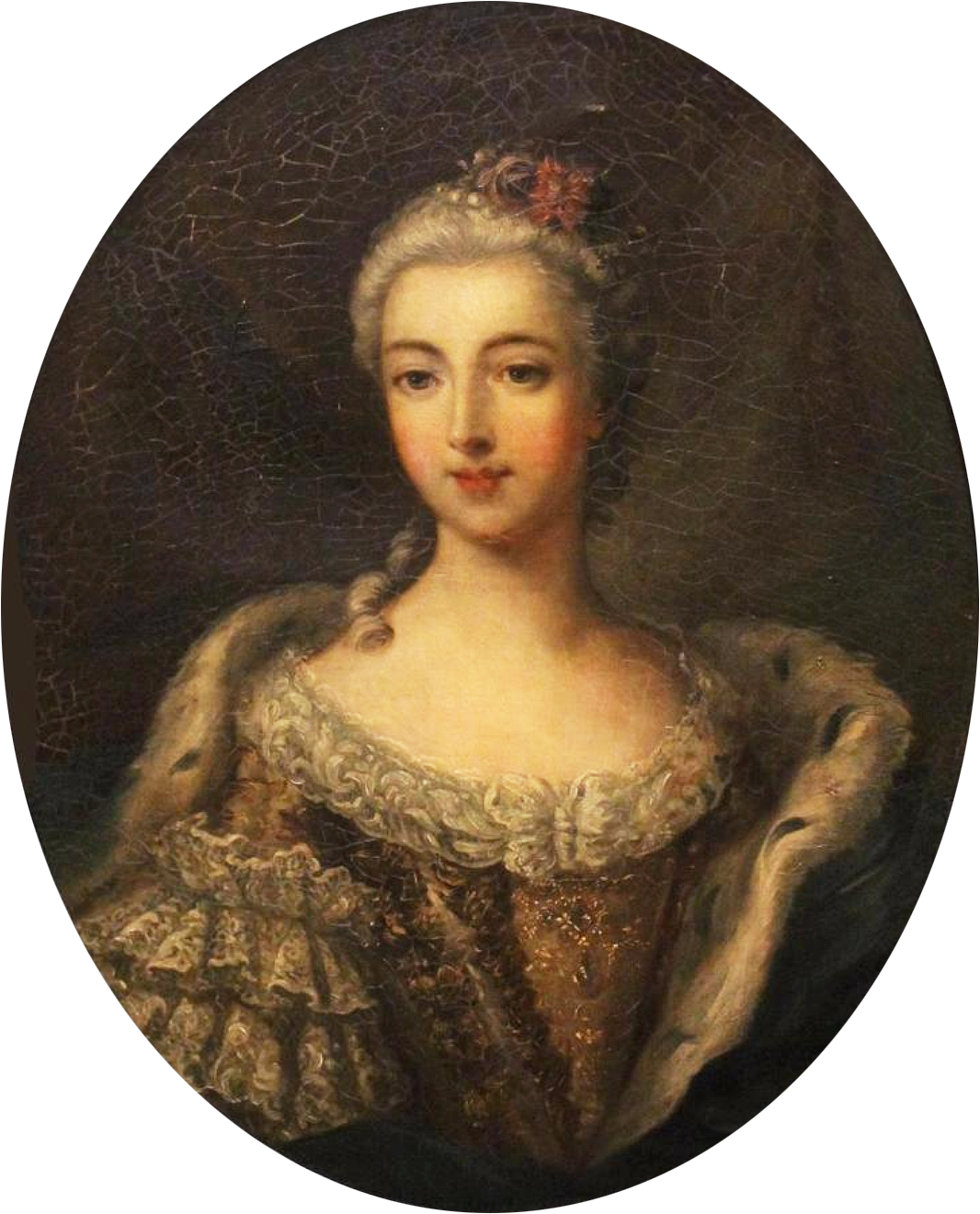
- Born: 4 December 1707; Palace of Versailles, France
- Died: 19 August 1743 (aged 35); Château d'Anet, France
- Burial: Chapel of the Château d'Anet, France
Names
- Louise Françoise de Bourbon
- House: Bourbon-Maine
- Father: Louis Auguste de Bourbon
- Mother: Louise Bénédicte de Bourbon

Louise Françoise de Bourbon (4 December 1707 – 19 August 1743) was a French aristocrat, daughter of Louis Auguste, Duke of Maine, who was the son of King Louis XIV and his mistress Madame de Montespan. Louise-Françoise was known as Mademoiselle du Maine and had no children.

== Biography ==
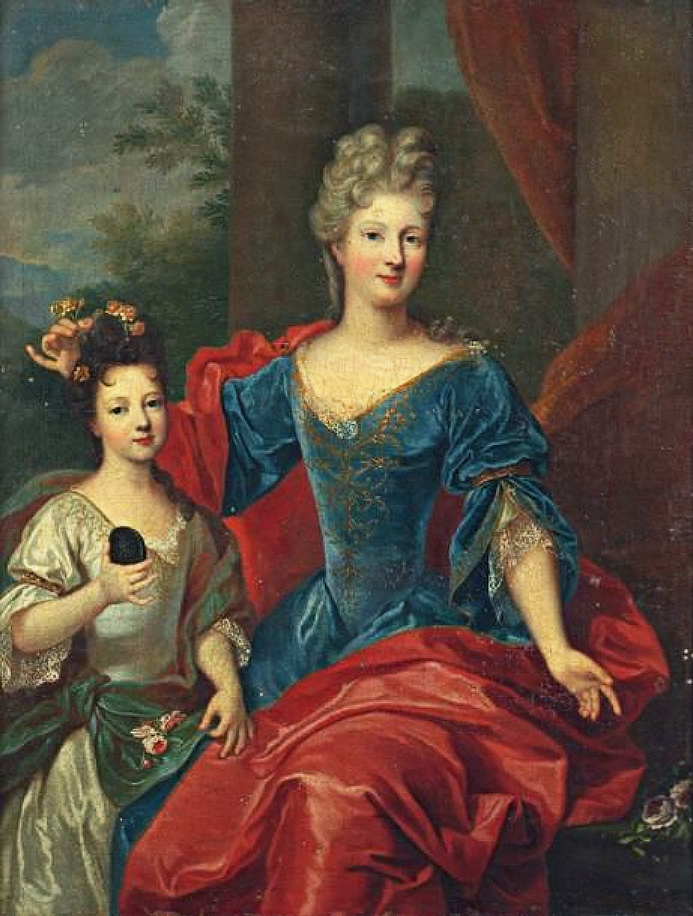
Louise Bénédicte and her daughter Louise Françoise de Bourbon, Mademoiselle du Maine

Louise Françoise de Bourbon was born at the Palace of Versailles to Louis Auguste de Bourbon, Légitimé de France, duc du Maine and his wife Louise Bénédicte de Bourbon, known as Mademoiselle de Charolais prior to her marriage. Her father was the eldest legitimised son of Louis XIV and Madame de Montespan. Her mother was later a famous salon hostess at the family home Château de Sceaux. Her mother was also a granddaughter of le Grand Condé.

Known as Mademoiselle du Maine, she was the youngest of seven children and her parents' only surviving daughter; her two elder sisters had both died in early childhood.

Mademoiselle du Maine was placed in the Abbaye de Maubuisson, a very prestigious abbey in the Saint-Ouen-l'Aumône area of France, the north-western suburbs of Paris, France. It is located 27.6 km (17.1 mi) from the centre of Paris. As such she grew up here; when once visiting Madame de Maintenon in 1717, Maintenon said that she and her two brothers would have been very pleased with them.

Louise-Françoise was very close to her parents, even though the latter were never really close. Louise-Françoise's mother would frequently embarrass her husband and this caused much friction. On 9 April 1714, she was baptised with the name of her aunt Louise Françoise de Bourbon, known as Madame la Duchesse. Madame la Duchesse had grown up with the Duke of Maine under the care of Madame de Maintenon. Present at her baptism were the Dauphin Louis de France, who was the guest of honour being helped by Mademoiselle du Maine's other paternal aunt, the Duchess of Orléans. It was the Cardinal de Rohan who baptised Mademoiselle du Maine.

In 1718, during the regency of Philippe d'Orléans, both of her parents were imprisoned, her father was sent to Doullens and her mother to Dijon. She was moved from the Abbey at Maubuisson to another convent at Chaillot in Paris around the area of the present Trocadéro. She stayed at Chaillot until 1720, when her parents were released from their separate imprisonments.

At the death of her father, she was given his apartments on the ground floor overlooking the Orangerie and lived next to her mother. Mademoiselle du Maine was rumoured to have been betrothed to one Monsieur de Guise, but the said engagement never materialised. By 1740, another possible marriage was with the widowed Prince of Monaco who was often in residence at Versailles. This never occurred either. Another candidate was her first cousin, Louis de Bourbon, youngest son of her namesake and her uncle the Duke of Bourbon.

Louise Françoise is said not to have been attractive; the 1910 book on her mother the duchesse du Maine stated that she was neither pretty nor attractive, and save for her dowry, no one would have sought her hand. He also said that her court hoops were so large that on one occasion they became entangled with those of the Queen and the two women had to stand and pull against each other to disentangle themselves. Louis XV was most annoyed and Monsieur de La Tremoille was sent to the duchesse du Maine with the measurement for the hoops Mademoiselelle should wear, with the rider that in future she should stand at a more respectful distance from the Queen.

Louise Françoise would never marry; dying at the Château d'Anet at the age of 35 having been taken ill while out riding, noted by the duc de Luynes; he also noted No sooner was she placed in her carriage than she fainted away. She never recovered consciousness, and died a few hours later. She left her profitable pensions to her first cousin Élisabeth Alexandrine de Bourbon, Mademoiselle de Sens; daughter of her namesake Madame la Duchesse.

She was buried at the Chapel of the Château d'Anet; her grave was left by revolutionaries of 1789–1799. She was outlived by her two elder brothers and her mother.

== Ancestry ==
Ancestors of Louise Françoise de Bourbon, Mademoiselle du Maine

16. Henry IV of France
8. Louis XIII of France
17. Marie de' Medici
4. Louis XIV of France
18. Philip III of Spain
9. Anne of Austria
19. Margaret of Austria
2. Louis Auguste, Duke of Maine
20. Gaspard de Rochechouart, marquis de Mortemart
10. Gabriel de Rochechouart, duc de Mortemart
21. Louise de Maure, comtesse de Maure
5. Madame de Montespan
22. Jean de Grandseigne, marquis de Marsillac
11. Diane de Grandseigne
23. Catherine de La Béraudière, dame de Villenon
1. Louise Françoise, Mademoiselle du Maine
24. Henry II, Prince of Condé
12. Louis II, Prince of Condé
25. Charlotte-Marguerite de Montmorency
6. Henri Jules, Prince of Condé
26. Urbain de Maillé, marquis de Brézé
13. Claire Clémence de Maillé Brézé
27. Nicole du Plessis de Richelieu
3. Louise Bénédicte de Bourbon
28. Frederick V of the Palatinate
14. Edward, Count Palatine of Simmern
29. Elizabeth Stuart
7. Anne Henriette of Bavaria
30. Charles Gonzaga, Duke of Mantua
15. Anne Gonzaga
31. Catherine of Lorraine
