= Grand Master of Artillery =

French government office under the ancien régime

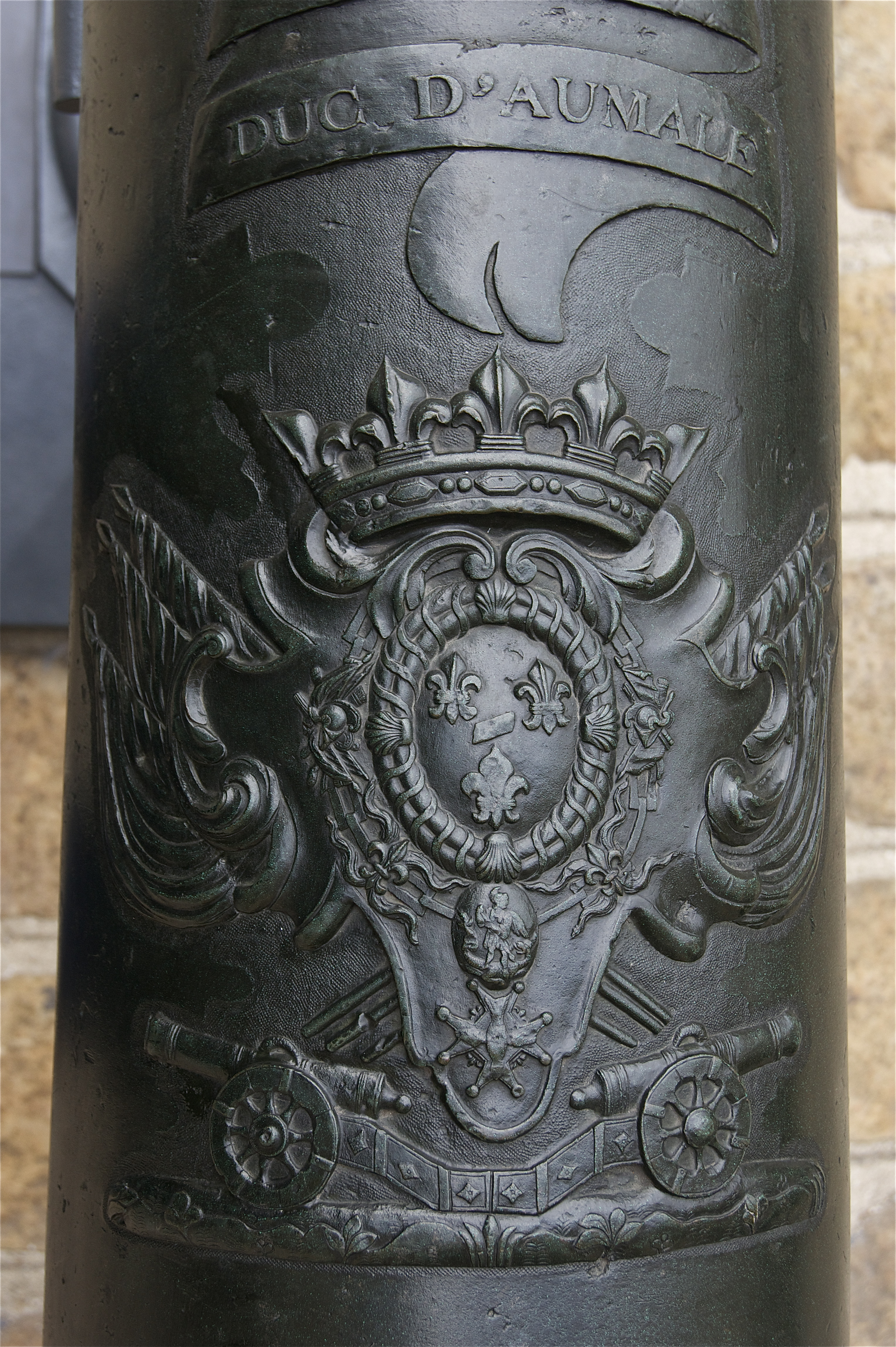
Arms of Louis Charles de Bourbon, duc d'Aumale cast on an 18th-century cannon; the two guns in the compartment indicate his position as Grand Master of Artillery.

The Grand Master of Artillery (French: Grand Maître de l'artillerie) was one of the Great Officers of the Crown of France during the Ancien Régime.

The position of Grand Master of Artillery replaced the earlier position of Grand Maître des arbalétriers ("Grand Master of the Archers"). It was made a Great Office of the Crown in 1601 by King Henry IV for the benefit of Maximilien de Béthune, duc de Sully.

The Grand Master of Artillery had jurisdiction, at the beginning of the 17th century, over all the officers and the artillery of the French army, as well as oversight over sieges and encampments, the making of gunpowder and cannons and management of the arsenals. At the end of the century, the position became merely honorific, and his duties passed to other more specialized officers, most notably the "surintendant des fortifications".

== List of Grand Masters of the Artillery ==
- 1512 : Jacques Ricard de Genouillac (1465-1546), seigneur d'Acier
- 1546 : Jean de Taix (+1553), seigneur de Thais et Sepmes
- 1547 : Charles I de Cossé (1507-1563), comte de Brissac
- 1550 : Jean I d'Estrées (1486-1571), comte d'Orbec
- 1567 : Jean Babou (1511-1569), seigneur de La Bourdaisière
- 1569 : Armand de Gontaut (1524-1592), baron de Biron
- 1578 : Philibert de La Guiche (+1607)
- 1596 : François d'Espinay (1554-1597), seigneur de Saint-Luc
- 1597 : Antoine d'Estrées (c.1529-1609), marquis de Coeuvres
- 1599 : Maximilien de Béthune (1559-1641), baron, then marquis de Rosny, then duc de Sully
- 1610 : Maximilien II de Béthune (1588-1634), marquis de Rosny et prince d'Henrichemont, son of the previous
- 1629 : Antoine Coëffier de Ruzé (1581-1632), marquis d'Effiat
- 1634 : Charles de La Porte (1602-1664), marquis, then duc de La Meilleraye
- 1646 : Armand-Charles de La Porte (1632-1713), duc de La Meilleraye, de Mayenne et de Rethelois-Mazarin, son of the previous
- 1669 : Henry de Daillon (c.1622-1685), comte du Lude, then duc du Lude
- 1685 : Louis de Crevant 1628-1694), duc d'Humières
- 1694 : Louis I Auguste de Bourbon (1670-1736), duc du Maine
- 1736 : Louis Charles de Bourbon (1701-1775), comte d'Eu
- 1755 : Function abolished

== See also ==
- Great Officers of the Crown of France
- Maison du Roi
