= Robert de Fiennes =

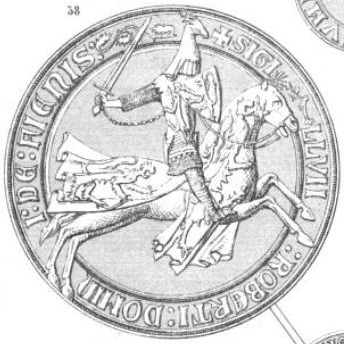
Robert de Fiennes.png

Robert de Fiennes, named Moreau (1308–1385) was the 28th Constable of France.

His father was Jean de Fiennes, Lord of Tingry and Chatelain of Bourbourg. His mother was Isabella of Flanders, daughter of Guy, Count of Flanders and Isabelle of Luxembourg.

In 1356, he succeeded Walter VI, Count of Brienne as Constable of France. In 1358, he prevented the English of occupying Amiens. Between 1360 and 1361, he was Governor of Languedoc. After the Treaty of Brétigny, his castle at Fiennes, Pas-de-Calais came into the English sphere of influence. Robert de Fiennes refused to pledge allegiance to the English King, which led to a siege of his castle by 25.000 English soldiers. In 1370, he resigned as Constable because of his age, and he was succeeded by Bertrand du Guesclin.

He married firstly to Béatrice Dame de Gavre, and then to Marguerite de Melun. He had no known children.

== Sources ==
- Jean-Michel Dousseau: Dictionnaire des Connétables et Maréchaux de France. Société Généalogique de l'Yonne, Auxerre, 1996, ISBN 2-9510313-3-5, S. 19.
