= Château de Clagny =

Demolished French country house

Coordinates: 48°48′32″N 2°8′14″E

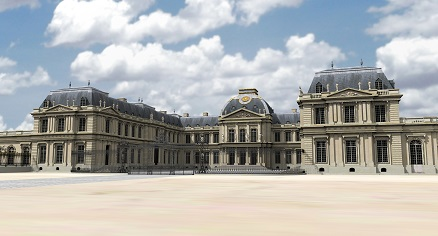
3D reconstruction: the Chateau seen from the entrance

The Château de Clagny was a French country house that stood northeast of the Palace of Versailles; it was designed by Jules Hardouin-Mansart for Madame de Montespan between 1674 and 1680. Although among the most important of the private residences designed by this great architect, it was demolished in 1769 after years of neglect.

Its appearance can only be traced through the engravings made of it, and scattered references in the archives of the Bâtiments du Roi.

== The Château de Clagny ==
Louis XIV had bought the estate of Clagny from the Hôpital des Incurables of Paris in 1665. On 22 May 1674, Colbert's son submitted to him a plan designed by the young Mansart, who had used his family ties with the great François Mansart of the previous reign to make himself and his talents known at court. By 12 June, work was ordered to begin at once because Madame de Montespan was anxious to start planting the grounds that very fall. André Le Nôtre designed the layout of the gardens. In August 1675, Madame de Sévigné visited Clagny, which she described to her daughter:

"We have been at Clagny, and what shall I tell you about it? It is a palace of Armida; (Note: Mme de Sévigné is referring to the phantasmagorical palace conjured by the sorceress Armida to entrap Rinaldo, in Torquato Tasso's Gerusalemme liberata.) the building rises à vue d'œil, (Note: "under one's very eyes".) the gardens are already made. You know what Le Nôtre is. He has left standing a little dark wood which is very nice; and next comes a little wood of oranges in great tubs: you can stroll in this wood, which has shady avenues, and there are hedges on both sides cut breast-high, so as to conceal the tubs, and these are full of tuberoses, roses, jasmine, and pinks. This novelty is certainly the prettiest, most surprising and ravishing that one could imagine, and the little wood is greatly liked."

The orangerie, where the "little wood of oranges" wintered at Clagny, was a showpiece itself, paved with marble. In the gardens cabinets de verdure shaped into niches that held sculptures were clipped into the dense woods, fitted with trelliswork dadoes to fill in their sparse bases.

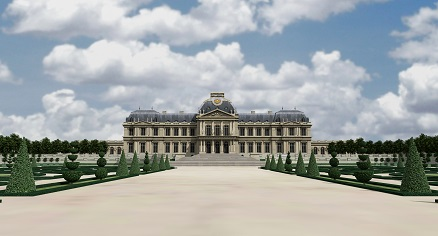
3D reconstruction: the Chateau seen from the garden

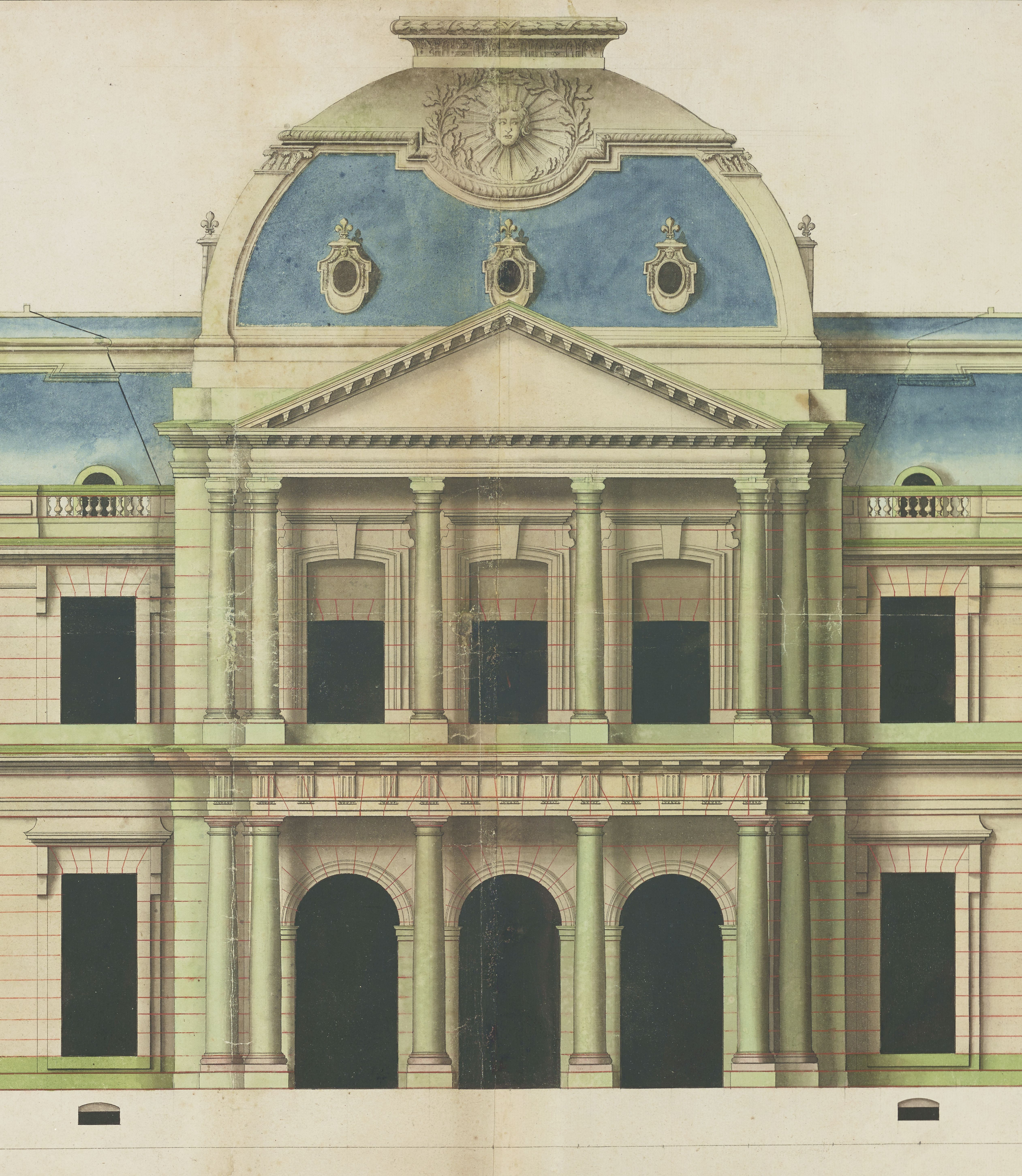
Elevation of the central pavilion of the château, by Jules Hardouin-Mansart

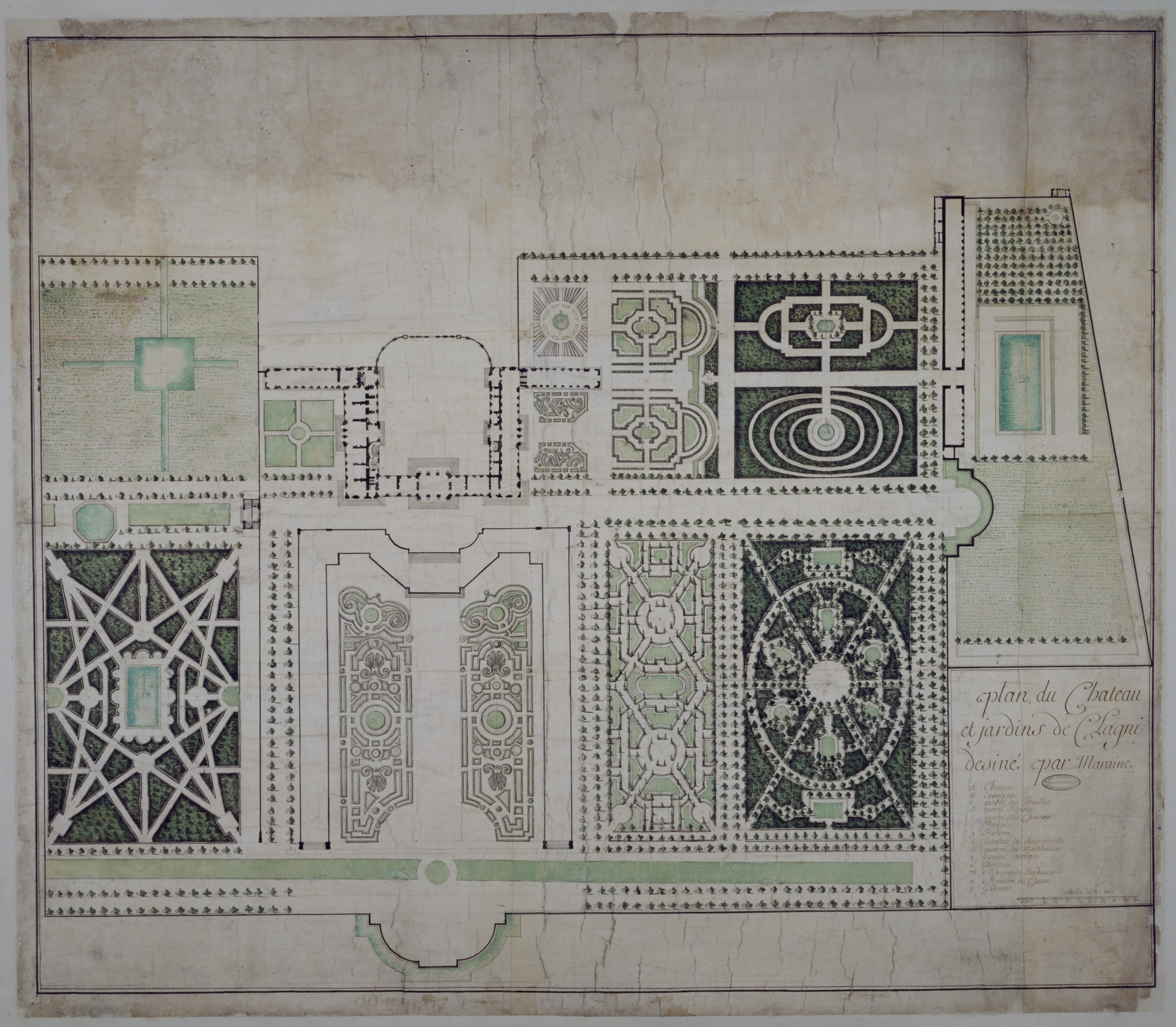
Plan of the château and its gardens

In a portrait painted by Henri Gascar, Madame de Montespan had herself painted while reclining on a baroque canopied couch, its curtains held up by carved cupids, with the barrel-vaulted galerie of Clagny visible behind her, as grand a piece of architecture as any to which a sovereign could yet lay claim. About 1680, Adam-Frans van der Meulen painted a landscape view of a promenade en calèche with Louis XIV, Queen Marie-Thérèse, Madame de Montespan, and the king's son and his wife, which includes in a single coup d'œil both Versailles and Clagny, showing how closely the two châteaux were located.

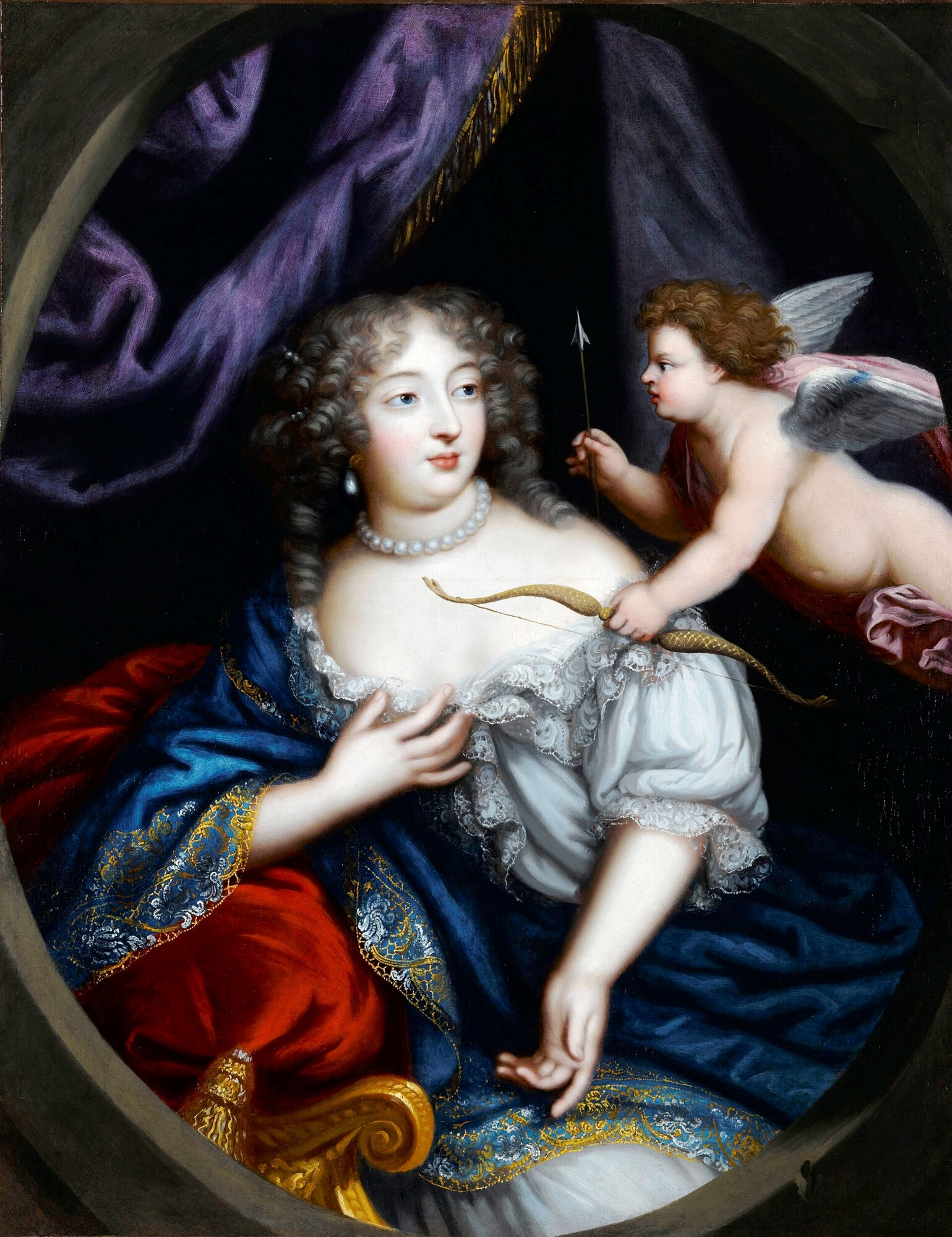
The Marquise de Montespan, the owner of Clagny

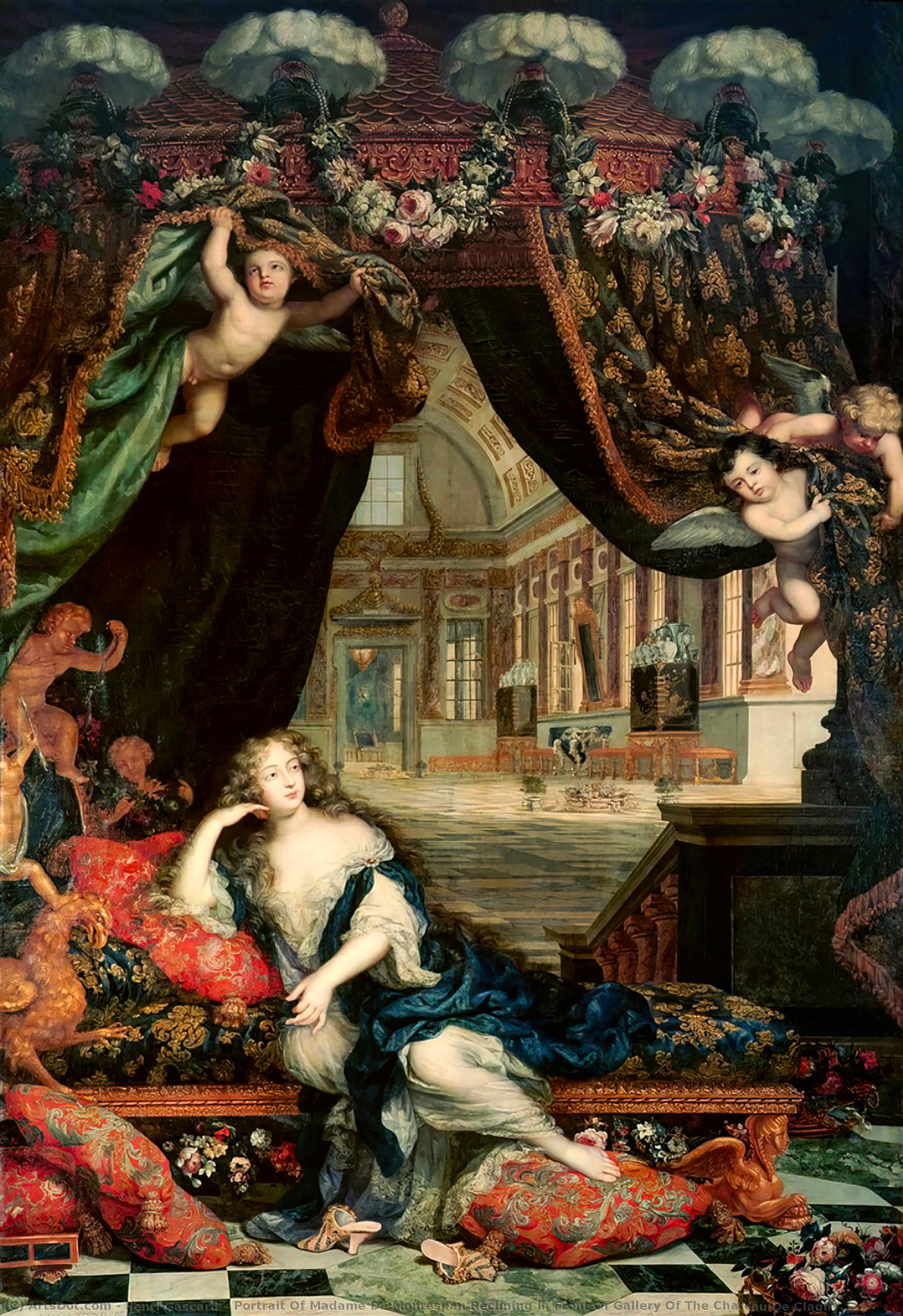
Portrait of Marquise de Montespan at Clagny

After the Marquise de Montespan was compromised in the notorious Affaire des Poisons, she was abandoned by the king for Madame de Maintenon, the governess of the marquise's children. As a result of her loss of status at court, she visited the house less and less. In 1685, the King formally made it over to her as a gift, partially for the sake of their eldest natural son, the beloved Louis-Auguste, Duke of Maine. In June 1692, Madame de Montespan retired to a convent.

== After Madame de Montespan ==
At her death in 1707, the Duke of Maine inherited Clagny, followed in time by his grandson, Louis Auguste, Prince of Dombes, who as it turned out became the last of his line. The château reverted to the Crown in 1766.

By then, the château, which Madame de Sévigné estimated to have cost not less than two million livres, and to have kept 1200 workers occupied, suffered from years of neglect. It was virtually unoccupied for forty years, and the dampness of the surrounding environment greatly accelerated its deterioration.

Gradually, the quartier nouveau of the town of Versailles expanded to the edge of the estate of Clagny, nestling in the northern corner between the château and the étang de Clagny, the pond in its park. In 1736, following an episode of "fièvre paludéenne", possibly malaria, in the quartier Notre-Dame of Versailles, it was decided to drain the pond and fill it in.

When the ownership of Clagny reverted to the Crown, Louis XV gave some eleven hectares at the edge of the estate to his very religious queen, Maria Leszczyńska, who used the land to establish an Ursuline convent which was built from 1767 to 1772 according to the designs of Richard Mique. The château was demolished in 1769. Some of its dressed stone was employed in constructing the nearby new convent and other stone found its way into the hôtels particuliers along the new Boulevard de la Reine, built through the park in 1772. The park was further subdivided under the Second Empire; one part now hosts the Science division of the Versailles Saint-Quentin-en-Yvelines University and the pavillon Panhard.
