= Louis Auguste, Prince of Dombes =

French noble; grandson of Louis XIV (1700–1755)

Louis Auguste
- Prince of Dombes
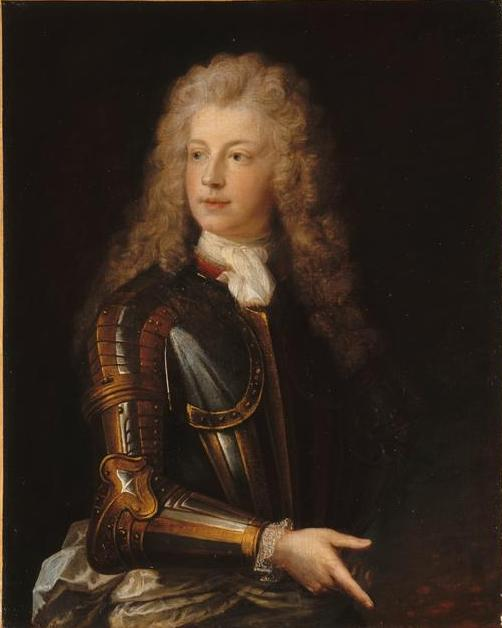
- Portrait by François de Troy
- Born: 4 March 1700; Palace of Versailles, France
- Died: 1 October 1755 (aged 55); Palace of Fontainebleau, Fontainebleau, France
- Burial: Église, Sceaux, France
Names
- Louis Auguste de Bourbon
- House: Bourbon-Maine
- Father: Louis Auguste de Bourbon
- Mother: Louise Bénédicte de Bourbon

Louis Auguste de Bourbon, Prince of Dombes (4 March 1700 in Palace of Versailles – 1 October 1755 in Palace of Fontainebleau) was a grandson of Louis XIV and of his maîtresse-en-titre Françoise-Athénaïs de Montespan. He was a member of the legitimised House of Bourbon-Maine.

== Biography ==
Born at the Palace of Versailles on 4 March 1700, Louis-Auguste was the fourth child of Louis-Auguste de Bourbon, duc du Maine and of his wife, Anne Louise Bénédicte de Bourbon.

Given the title of prince de Dombes at his birth, he was the second child of his parents to hold the title. (Note: An older brother Louis Constantin de Bourbon (1695-1698) had held the title previously.)

He became Colonel General of the Cent-Suisses et Grisons (1710), Governor of Languedoc (1737), Grand veneur de France and Count of Eu (1736).

Unlike his father, the prince de Dombes was of high military skill. Louis-Auguste served under the renowned military commander Prince Eugene of Savoy in the Austro-Turkish War (1716–1718). He also fought in the War of the Polish Succession (1733–1738) and in the War of the Austrian Succession (1740–1748).

Upon the death of his father (to whom he was very close), on 14 May 1736 at the Château de Sceaux, he inherited the bulk of his wealth and his titles.

On 4 March 1748 he killed Jean Antoine François, Marquis de Coigny in a duel.

“The Marquis de Coigny used to gamble with the Prince des Dombes, and lost a lot; one day, he said through his teeth : he is happier than a legitimate child. The prince had not heard the remark; but charitable souls (there are always some) brought it to him. He flew into a rage, and sent to call M. de Coigny to a duel. They met on the road to Versailles, in the middle of the night. The ground was covered with snow; they fought with torches : M. de Coigny was killed on the spot; they put him back in his carriage, which they overturned in a ditch. He was said to have died from the fall. The king, who loved him very much, did not know the truth until after the death of the Prince of Dombes, and some people even believed that he never knew it. »

In 1750, he gained the titles of prince d'Anet and comte de Dreux, when his mother gave him both estates three years before she died. Little seen at the court of his cousin Louis XV, he preferred living at the Château d'Anet, which he continued to embellish. In order to supply water for his gardens, he created a hydraulic system which he installed in the park of the domain near the river Eure. He also enjoyed hunting on his large estate of Eu.

Louis-Auguste remained unmarried and died childless. A possible wife had been his cousin, Charlotte Aglaé d'Orléans, daughter of Philippe II, Duke of Orléans and Françoise-Marie de Bourbon, and another cousin, Louise Anne de Bourbon, daughter of Louise-Françoise de Bourbon, the duc du Maine's younger sister.

Louis-Auguste died on 1 October 1755, at the age of fifty-five, of a stroke in Fontainebleau. His younger brother, Louis Charles, was his only heir.

== Ancestry ==
Ancestors of Louis Auguste, Prince of Dombes

16. Henry IV of France
8. Louis XIII of France
17. Marie de' Medici
4. Louis XIV of France
18. Philip III of Spain
9. Anne of Austria
19. Margaret of Austria
2. Louis Auguste, Duke of Maine
20. Gaspard de Rochechouart, marquis de Mortemart
10. Gabriel de Rochechouart, duc de Mortemart
21. Louise de Maure, comtesse de Maure
5. Madame de Montespan
22. Jean de Grandseigne, marquis de Marsillac
11. Diane de Grandseigne
23. Catherine de La Béraudière, dame de Villenon
1. Louis Auguste, Prince of Dombes
24. Henry II, Prince of Condé
12. Louis II, Prince of Condé
25. Charlotte-Marguerite de Montmorency
6. Henri Jules, Prince of Condé
26. Urbain de Maillé, marquis de Brézé
13. Claire Clémence de Maillé Brézé
27. Nicole du Plessis de Richelieu
3. Louise Bénédicte de Bourbon
28. Frederick V, Elector Palatine
14. Edward, Count Palatine of Simmern
29. Elizabeth Stuart
7. Anne Henriette of Bavaria
30. Charles Gonzaga, Duke of Mantua
15. Anne Gonzaga
31. Catherine of Lorraine
