= Louise Bénédicte de Bourbon =

Duchess of Maine (1676–1753)

- Duchess of Maine
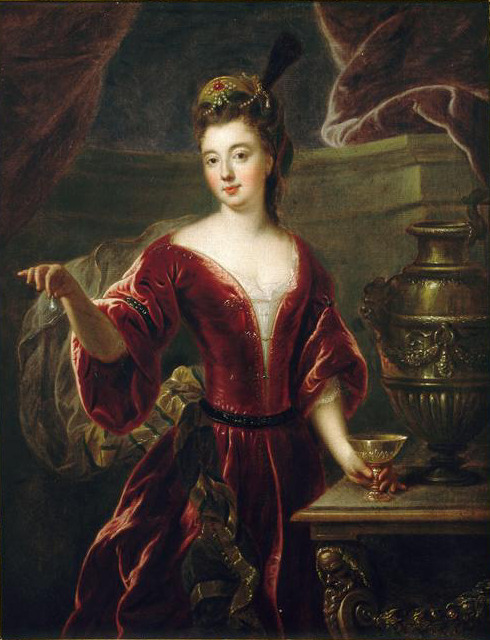
- Portrait by François de Troy as Cleopatra, c. 1690
- Born: 8 November 1676; Hôtel de Condé, Paris, France
- Died: 23 January 1753 (aged 76); Hôtel du Maine, Paris, France
- Burial: 26 January 1753; Church of Saint Jean Baptiste
- Spouse: Louis Auguste, Duke of Maine (m. 1692; died 1736)
- Issue Among others...: Louis Auguste, Prince of Dombes; Louis Charles, Count of Eu; Louise Françoise, Mademoiselle du Maine
- Father: Henri Jules de Bourbon-Condé
- Mother: Anne Henriette of Bavaria

Anne Louise Bénédicte de Bourbon (8 November 1676 – 23 January 1753) was the daughter of Henri Jules de Bourbon, Prince of Condé, and Anne Henriette of Bavaria. As a member of the reigning House of Bourbon, she was a princesse du sang. Forced to marry the Duke of Maine, legitimised son of Louis XIV and Madame de Montespan, she revelled in politics and the arts, and held a popular salon at the Hôtel du Maine as well as at the Château de Sceaux.

== Biography ==
=== Birth ===
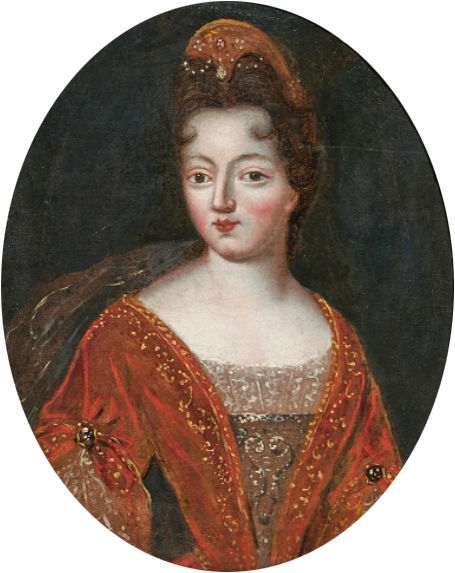
Portrait of a young girl presumed to depict Louise Bénédicte, unknown artist

Louise Bénédicte was born on 8 November 1676 at the Hôtel de Condé (Note: Hôtel de Condé would ordinarily refer to the principal residence of the House of Condé in Paris. At the time this hôtel particulier was built, Louis Joseph de Bourbon was living at the Palais Bourbon with his mistress, Maria Caterina Brignole. The former Condé hôtel occupied the site where the Théâtre de l'Odéon now stands. The hôtel gave its name to the present rue de Condé, on which its forecourt faced. On 26 March 1770, an order in council authorised the execution of the Odéon project, designed by Charles de Wailly and Marie Joseph Peyre on the grounds of the garden of the hôtel of the prince de Condé, who expected to be rid of the property in expectations of setting up more grandly in the Palais Bourbon.) in Paris. She was the eighth child born to the then Duke and Duchess of Enghien. The name Bénédicte was added in honour of the child's maternal aunt, the Duchess of Brunswick-Lüneburg.

She was brought up at the Hôtel de Condé with her many sisters and had to endure slave-like conditions under the madness of her father. Her mother, who was pious and gentle, was often beaten by her father as were their staff and her sister Marie Anne, Mademoiselle de Montmorency. When formally addressed, Louise Bénédicte was known as Mademosielle d'Enghien. As a princess of the blood, she possessed the style of Serene Highness. When she was nine years old, her father was given the title of Count of Charolais, and as a result Louise Bénédicte became known at court as Mademoiselle de Charolais. This appellation would later pass to her niece Louise Anne.

She was very outspoken and witty, and had a terrible temper. As she was very small and paid much attention to her appearance, she was nicknamed poupée du Sang at the French court, literally, "Doll of the Blood", a play on the honorific princesse du sang, princess of the Blood. This nickname is sometimes said to have been made up by her sister-in-law the Duchess of Bourbon. She was close to her sister Marie Anne, whose marriage to the Duke of Vendôme (1654–1712) she later arranged. Although born with a lame arm, she was generally thought to be the most attractive of the Condé daughters. Despite this Madame, Duchess of Orléans, sister-in-law of Louis XIV called her a "little toad." Some time after her marriage, the Duchess of Orléans also said that "Madame du Maine is not taller than a child ten years old, and is not well-made. To appear tolerably well, it is necessary for her to keep her mouth shut; for when she opens it, she opens it very wide, and shows her irregular teeth. She is not very stout, uses a great quantity of paint, has fine eyes, a white skin, and fair hair. If she were well-disposed, she might pass, but her wickedness is insupportable". She was very short like her older sister Anne Marie, Mademoiselle de Condé. Louise Bénédicte and her oldest sister Marie Thérèse de Bourbon, known as Mademoiselle de Bourbon until her marriage to le Grand Conti in 1688, were considered the most attractive of the daughters born to the Condés.

Mademoiselle d'Enghien received the typical education given to girls of the nobility in France and was taught reading, writing, dancing, singing and other matters which were considered necessary for a young aristocrat. She spent most of her time in the company of her mother and two older sisters.

=== Marriage ===
At first, it was proposed that she marry Louis de Bourbon, Count of Vermandois, son of Louis XIV and Louise de La Vallière. However, the count died in exile in 1683. Louis XIV arranged several marriages into princely houses of France for his legitimised children by Louise de La Vallière. Prior to her marriage, she saw the marriage of Philippe d'Orléans to Mademoiselle de Blois, future duchesse d'Orléans. Louise Bénédicte's own brother Louis de Bourbon had even had been forced to marry Mademoiselle de Nantes, eldest legitimised daughter of Louis XIV and Madame de Montespan.

In 1692, the 15-year-old Louise Bénédicte married the 22-year-old Louis Auguste de Bourbon, Légitimé de France, Duke of Maine. The wedding ceremony took place on 19 May 1692 in the chapel of the Palace of Versailles. Madame de Montespan was not invited, but all of Maine's siblings attended, as well as the princes and princesses of the blood. As both the groom and his wife were physically handicapped, members of the court joked that "look at the union of a one-armed woman and a lame man! What a beautiful couple!". (Note: Voici l'union d'un boiteux et d'une manchote. Ah, le beau couple!. Prince of Condé site.)

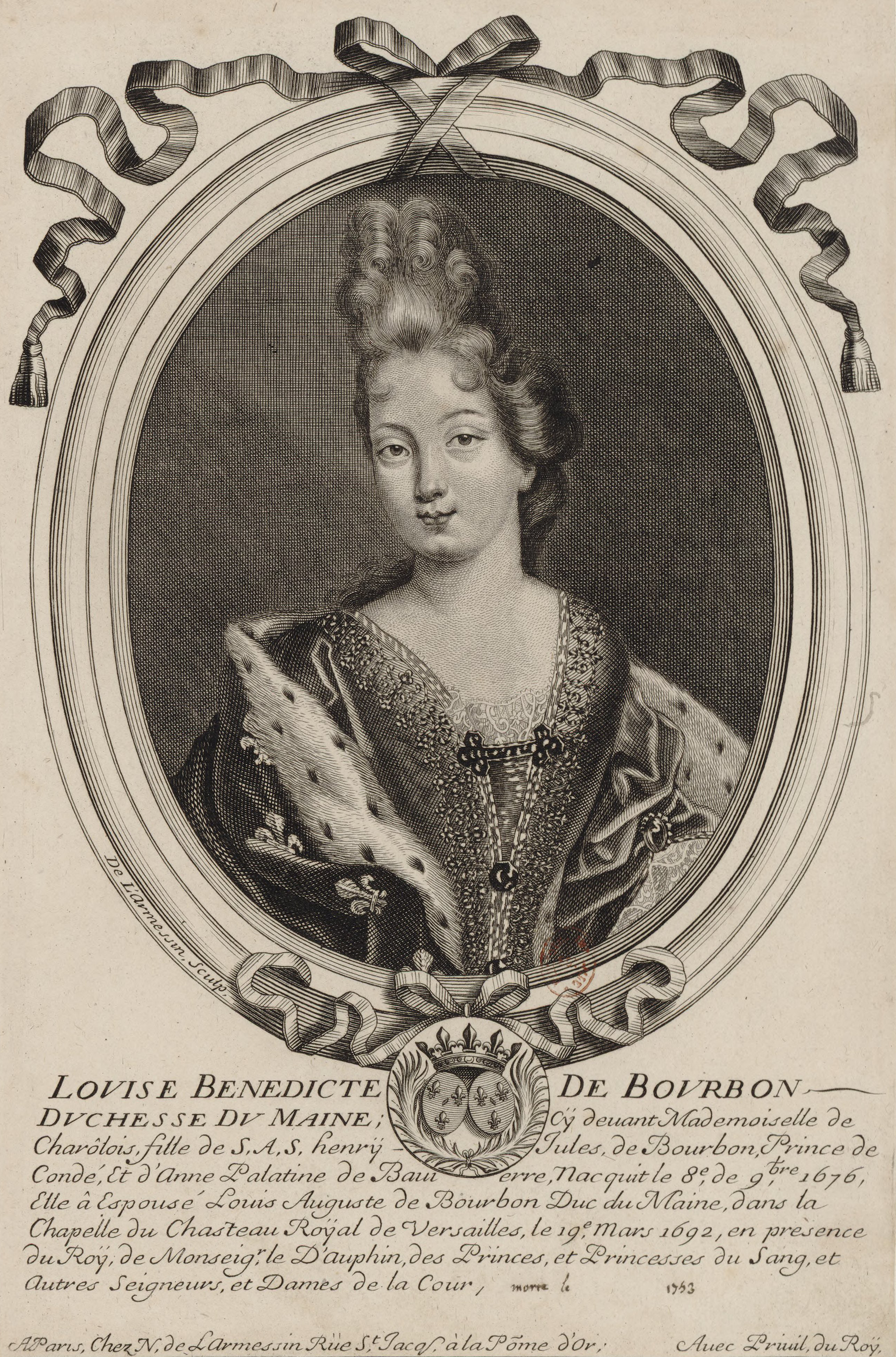
Louise Bénédicte in the year of her marriage

The marriage was not happy. The couple did not like each other; Louise Bénédicte found her husband weak and abhorred his lack of ambition, while he could not stand her terrible temper and deliberate attempts to embarrass him at court. Louise Bénédicte is said to have had several affairs which were known to Maine. To her husband, she was recorded as saying, "Just look at yourself – a lame bastard! – and you'd like to boss me? I am a pure bred royal princess, Monsieur, with no stain on my cradle! What would you be without the sticks at which everyone laughs? One to support your body, and the other, me, to maintain your rank! And this Leggy wants to rule my steps!" (Since Maine limped, his wife called him 'Gambillard', which meant leggy). (Note: "Regardez-vous un peu! Un bâtard boiteux! Qui me prétend gouverner! Je suis née princesse du sang, Monsieur, sans tache sur mon berceau! Vous, que seriez-vous sans les bâtons (les cannes) dont le monde rit bien haut? Un pour soutenir votre corps, plus moi pour soutenir votre rang! Et ce Gambillard-là réglerait mon pas!" – Prince of Condé site) Louise Bénédicte gave birth to three children in the first five years of her marriage, but they all died in early childhood.

In order to escape the court of Madame de Maintenon, Louis XIV's secret wife since October 1683, the duchesse du Maine created a court at the Château de Sceaux, where she entertained and immersed herself in political intrigues. The château, the former residence of Jean-Baptiste Colbert and his family, was bought in 1700 by her husband for the total of 900,000 livres. Louise Bénédicte spent a further 80,000 livres on its furnishings and decorations.

After extensive renovations, she took up residence in December 1700. There, she began to be called La Reine des Abeilles, or Queen of the Bees. In 1703, to amuse herself, Louise Bénédicte created her own personal chivalric order, the Order of the Honey Bee. She gave the order to thirty-nine people. Each member had a robe embroidered with silver thread, a wig in the shape of a beehive and a medal embossed with a profile of Louise Bénédicte and engraved with the letters L. BAR. D. SC. D.P.D.L.O.D.L.M.A.M, meaning Louise, baronne de Sceaux, dictatrice perpétuelle de l'ordre de la Mouche à miel ("Louise, baroness of Sceaux, dictator of Order of the Honey Bee").

To her small court, Louise Bénédicte attracted a host of literary figures of the day, including the young Voltaire, the Baron de Montesquieu, the cardinal de Bernis, the comte de Caylus, Charles-Jean-François Hénault and Jean-Baptiste Rousseau.

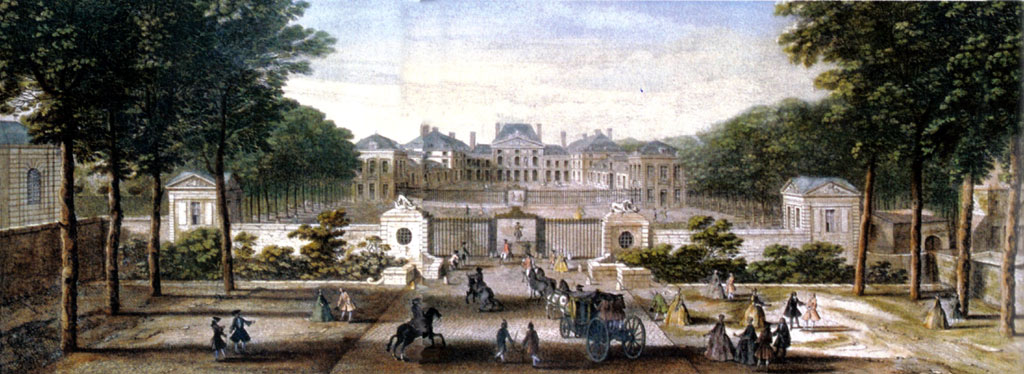
The Château de Sceaux at the time of Louise Bénédicte

In 1710, she helped to plot the marriage of her sister, Marie Anne, Mademoiselle de Monmorency, to the famous general Louis Joseph de Bourbon, duc de Vendôme. For mercenary reasons, Louise Bénédicte wanted a marriage that would not produce any children. Upon the death of a childless Vendôme, Louise Bénédicte hoped that she or her children would inherit the duke's huge estate, which he had acquired as the grandson of the rich heiress, Françoise of Lorraine. At thirty-two, Marie Anne was considered past child-bearing age, and Vendôme was a well known homosexual, thirty years older than his prospective bride. As it happened, though, Louise Bénédicte got nothing. On the duke's death, Marie Anne was created Duchess of Étampes in her own right and inherited the Hôtel de Vendôme in Paris, where she died in 1718 from alcoholism.

Both the Maines doted on their seven children. Unfortunately, most of the children died young; only three lived to adulthood. Their only surviving daughter, who would remain close to her mother until her death, was baptised at Versailles on 9 April 1714. Mademoiselle du Maine was given the name of her paternal aunt Louise Françoise de Bourbon, known at court as Madame la Duchesse. Madame la Duchesse had grown up with Maine under the care of Madame de Maintenon.

The guest of honour at the baptism of Mademoiselle du Maine was the small dauphin, the future Louis XV, who was chaperoned by Maine's other sister, the new Duchess of Orléans. The cardinal de Rohan baptised Mademoiselle du Maine. Thanks to the help of Madame de Maintenon, who had always loved Maine, Louis XIV created Maine a Prince of the Blood which put him in line of succession to the throne. In his will, Louis XIV also appointed Maine to be the Regent of France for his five-year-old great-grandson, the future Louis XV.

=== Regency of Philippe d'Orléans ===
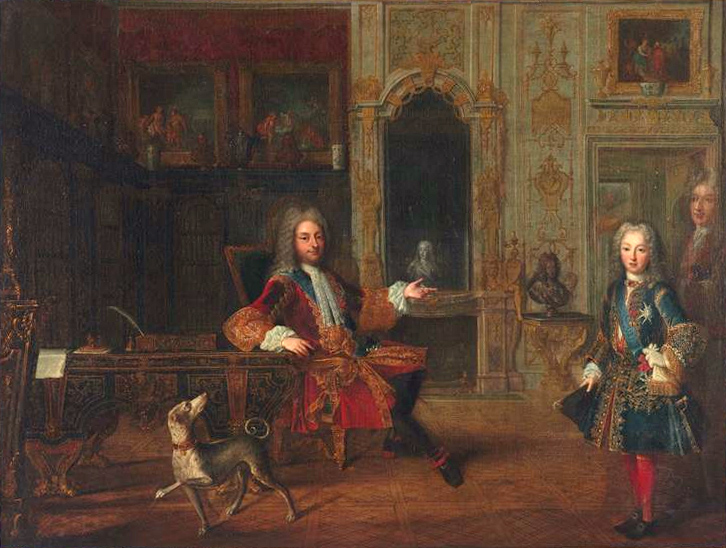
Philippe d'Orléans pointing to an infant Louis XV for whom he acted as regent for until 1723, Louise Bénédicte was imprisoned by Orléans as a result of her involvement in the Cellamare Conspiracy in 1719.

At the death of the king in 1715, however, the Parlement of Paris annulled Louis XIV's will and named Maine's brother-in-law, Philippe d'Orléans, Duke of Orléans, as Régent for the child king. Upset with this and the role played by the duc d'Orléans in reducing the status of the legitimised children of Louis XIV from the rank of Princes du Sang (which Louise Bénédicte had enjoyed since birth) to mere peers of France, Louise Bénédicte induced her husband to join in the Cellamare Conspiracy in the hope of transferring the regency to King Philip V of Spain, the uncle of Louis XV. The plot was named after Antonio del Giudice, Duke of Giovinazzo, Prince of Cellamare, who was the Spanish ambassador to France.

In order to gain more support for a new regent, Louise Bénédicte started a correspondence with Giulio Alberoni, the Spanish Prime Minister. Among her co-conspirators were the Duke of Richelieu and Melchior de Polignac. The plot, however, was discovered, and both the Maines were arrested and forced to abandon their residence at Sceaux. In 1719, the duke was imprisoned in the Doullens fortress and the duchess in Dijon. Their two sons were put in the care of their governor in Gien, and their daughter was taken from a convent at Maubuisson to another convent at Chaillot in Paris, in the area of the present Trocadéro. She stayed at Chaillot until 1720 when her parents were released from their separate imprisonments.

After her release, Louise Bénédicte led a more peaceful life at Sceaux, still surrounded though by her little court of wits and poets. On 27 December 1718, before their exile, she and her husband had purchased an unfinished house in Paris on the rue de Bourbon (now rue de Lille) from her sister Marie Thérèse de Bourbon. It was originally designed by the architect Robert de Cotte, but they had hired a new architect, Armand-Claude Mollet, to enlarge and redesign it. It was completed before their return from exile and became known as the Hôtel du Maine (destroyed 1838).

At the time of her imprisonment, she was trying to arrange the marriage of her eldest son, Louis Auguste de Bourbon, heir to the Maine's fortune, to his cousin Charlotte Aglaé, Mademoiselle de Valois. The rivalry between the Maines and Charlotte Aglaé's father, the Duke of Orléans, was well known, and it was hoped that the wedding would heal old wounds. A marriage did not occur, however, as the young Mademoiselle de Valois refused her cousin, much to the annoyance of the proud Louise Bénédicte. Madame du Maine was not happy when she found out that Charlotte Aglaé had considered the hand of another cousin, Charles de Bourbon, the son of Monsieur le Duc, Louise Bénédicte's brother, and Madame la Duchesse, Maine's sister.

=== Widowhood ===
After their release from imprisonment in 1720, the Maines seemed to have reconciled and led a more compatible life rather than being hostile to each other. In May 1736, the duke died at the age of sixty-six. Louis XV allowed Louise Bénédicte to keep her apartments at Versailles next to those of her daughter. These apartments overlooked the Orangérie. Both her sons also had apartments at court, but both preferred to stay in the country hunting. Madame du Maine tried on more than one occasion to arrange an advantageous marriage for her daughter. The first was to one Monsieur de Guise, but that marriage never materialised. Later, she tried to convince the widower Jacques I, Prince of Monaco, who was often at Versailles, to wed again. Despite the lure of a large dowry, both men considered Mademoiselle du Maine to be very unattractive. Unwed, she died in 1743. She was buried at the Église at Sceaux. At the time of her death, her library was numbered at having some 3000 books.

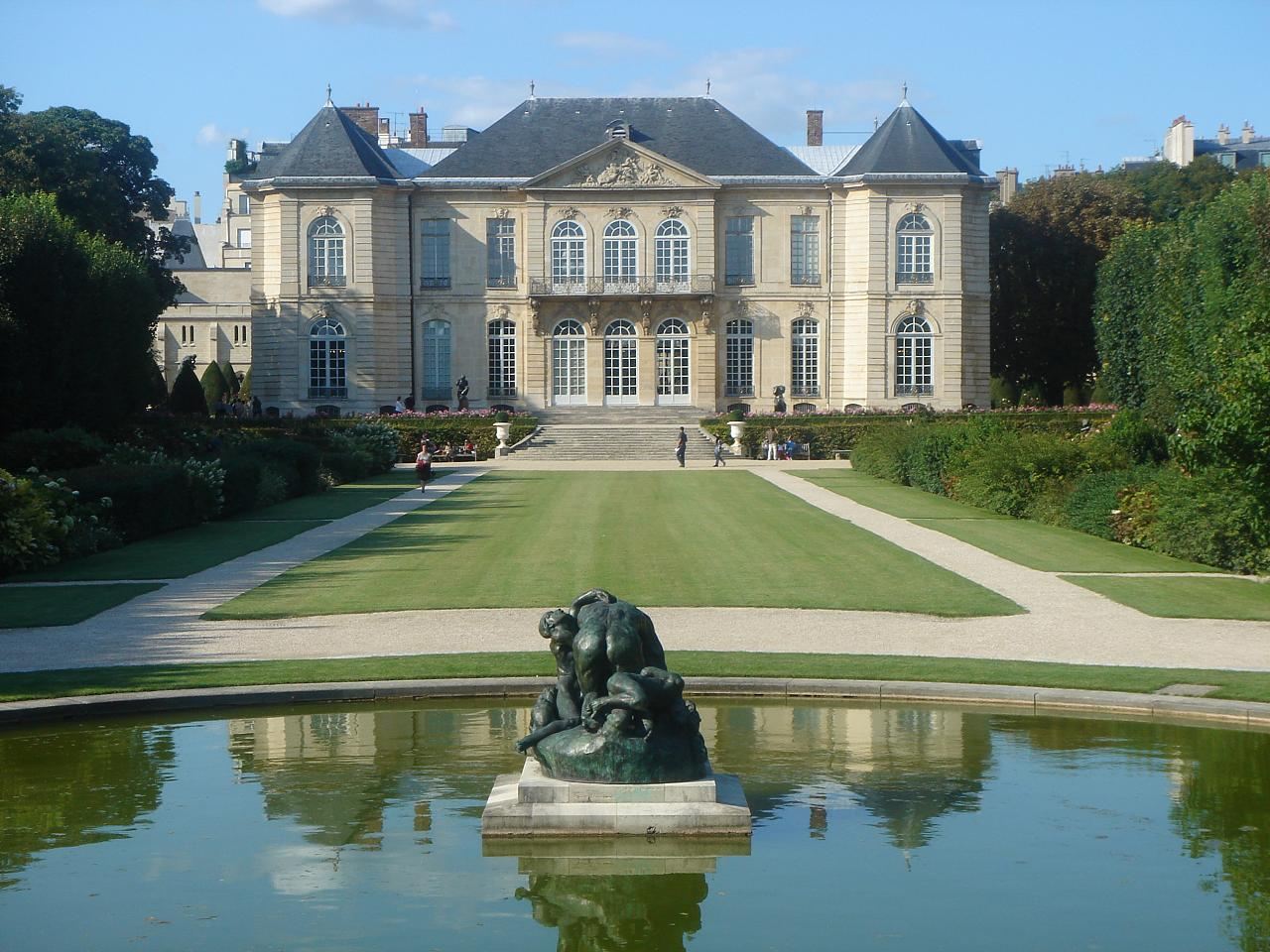
The Hôtel du Maine, present day Hôtel Biron where Louise Bénédicte lived as a widow

In 1736 Louise Bénédicte received the medieval Château de Montrond, which she allowed to be dismantled for its stone and the slate and lead in its roof. In 1737, she leased the Hôtel Peyrenc-de-Moras (today the Musée Rodin) in Paris from the widow of Abraham Peyrenc de Moras. During the remainder of her life, this was also referred to as the Hôtel du Maine, and she died there in January 1753. Dying at the age of seventy-six, Louise Bénédicte had outlived all of her siblings. She was buried at the Saint Jean-Baptiste church in Sceaux. Her oldest son, Louis Auguste, died less than two years after her, having been injured in a duel at Fontainebleau. Her youngest surviving son, Louis Charles, never married and died childless in 1775. He left his fortune to his first cousin, the already wealthy Louis Jean Marie de Bourbon, Duke of Penthièvre.

== Issue ==
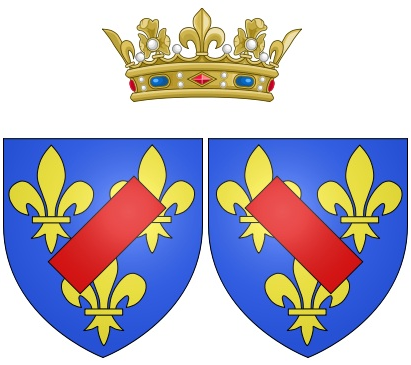
Arms of Louise Bénédicte as Duchess of Maine

- Mademoiselle de Dombes (Palace of Versailles, 11 September 1694 – Palace of Versailles, 15 September 1694), died in infancy.
- Louis Constantin de Bourbon, Prince of Dombes (Palace of Versailles, 17 November 1695 – Palace of Versailles, 28 September 1698), died in childhood.
- Mademoiselle d'Aumale (Palace of Versailles, 21 December 1697 – Palace of Versailles, 4 August 1699), died in childhood.
- Louis Auguste de Bourbon, Prince of Dombes (Palace of Versailles, 4 March 1700 – Palace of Fontainebleau, 1 October 1755), died unwed.
- Louis Charles de Bourbon, Count of Eu (Château de Sceaux, 15 October 1701 – 13 July 1775), died unwed.
- Charles de Bourbon, Duke of Aumale (Palace of Versailles, 31 March 1704 – Château de Sceaux, 2 September 1708), died in childhood.
- Louise Françoise de Bourbon, Mademoiselle du Maine (Palace of Versailles, 4 December 1707 – Château d'Anet, 19 August 1743), died unwed.

== Bibliography ==
- Chisholm, Hugh, ed. (1911). "Maine, Anne Louise Bénédicte de Bourbon, Duchesse du" . Encyclopædia Britannica. Vol. 17 (11th ed.). Cambridge University Press. p. 432.
- de Piépape, Léonce; May, James Lewis (1911). A Princess of Strategy: The Life of Anne Louise Bénédicte de Bourbon-Condé, Duchesse Du Maine. University of Michigan: J. Lane.
- Elizabeth Charlotte of the Palatinate; Stevenson, Gertrude Scott (1924). The Letters of Madame: The Correspondence of Elizabeth-Charlotte of Bavaria, Princess Palatine, Duchess of Orleans, Called "Madame" at the Court of King Louis XIV. D. Appleton.
