= Louis Auguste, Duke of Maine =

French duke; legitimized son of Louis XIV (1670–1736)

Louis-Auguste
- Duke of Maine; Sovereign Prince of the Dombes
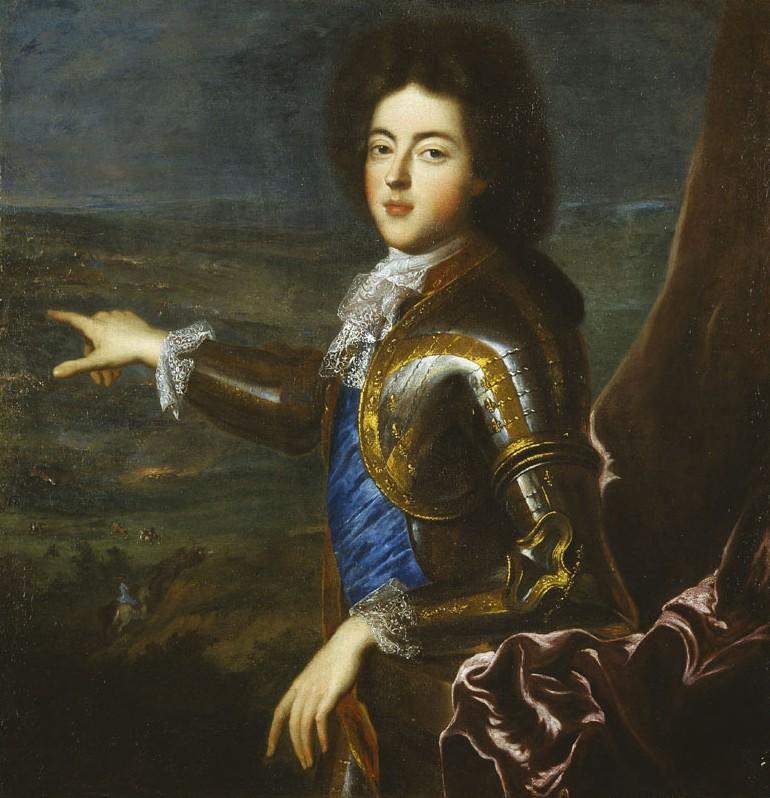
- Portrait by François de Troy
- Born: Louis Auguste de Bourbon; 31 March 1670; Château de Saint-Germain-en-Laye, France
- Died: 14 May 1736 (aged 66); Château de Sceaux, France
- Burial: Église, Sceaux, France
- Spouse: Louise Bénédicte de Bourbon (m. 1692)
- Issue: Louis Auguste, Prince of Dombes; Louis Charles, Count of Eu; Louise Françoise, Mademoiselle du Maine
- House: Bourbon-Maine
- Father: Louis XIV
- Mother: Madame de Montespan

Louis-Auguste de Bourbon, Légitimé de France, duc du Maine (31 March 1670 – 14 May 1736) was an illegitimate son of Louis XIV and his official mistress, Madame de Montespan. He was later legitimized and became the king's favourite son. He was the founder of the semi-royal House of Bourbon-Maine named after his title and his surname.

== Biography ==
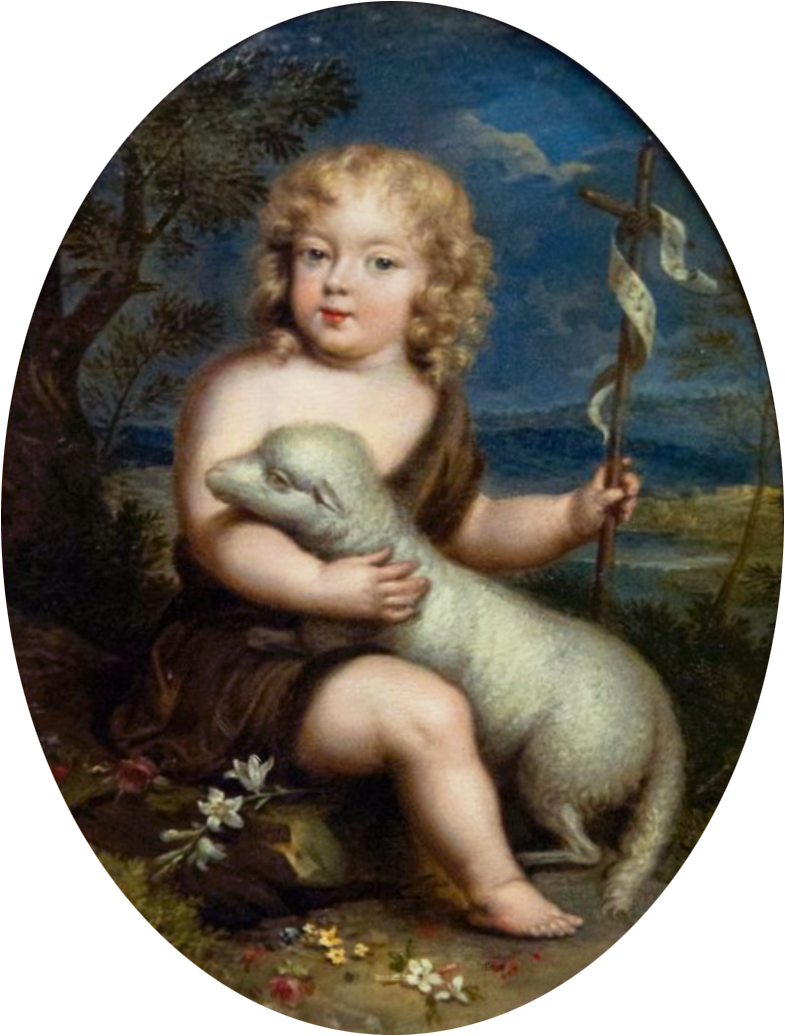
Louis-Auguste as a child, by an unknown painter

Louis-Auguste de Bourbon was born at the Château de Saint-Germain-en-Laye on 31 March 1670. He was named Louis after his father and Auguste after the Roman Emperor Augustus.

Immediately after his birth, Louis-Auguste was placed in the care of one of his mother's acquaintances, the widowed Madame Scarron, who took him to live in a house on rue de Vaugirard, near the Luxembourg Palace in Paris. His siblings, Louis-César, Louise-Françoise and Louise Marie Anne de Bourbon were also brought there after their births. Their mother, living with the king at Versailles, rarely saw her children, and Madame Scarron took the place of mother in Louis-Auguste's affections.

One of his legs was shorter than the other and Scarron took him to consult, first, a famous quack at Antwerp and later to the waters of Barèges, a small town near the Pyrenees, whither they traveled incognito (she as the marquise de Surgeres).

On 19 December 1673, when Louis-Auguste was three years old, Louis XIV legitimised his children by Montespan by letters patent registered by the Parlement of Paris. At this time, Louis-Auguste received the title of duc du Maine.

In 1674, at the age of four, Louis-Auguste and his siblings were officially introduced to the court at Versailles. In the same year, he was made a colonel-general of the Swiss Guards.

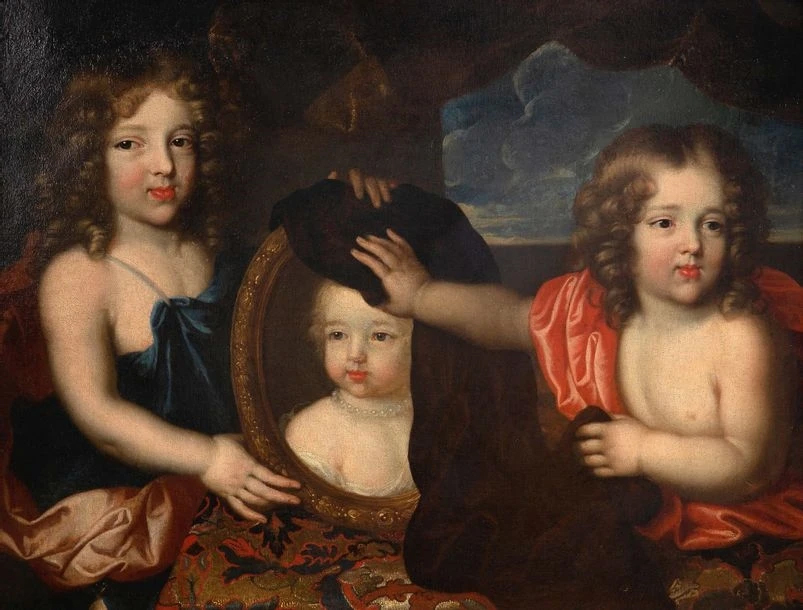
The Duke of Maine with his younger brother covering the portrait of a little girl with a black cloth, by Pierre Mignard.

Du Maine's greatest enemy at court became his father's sister-in-law, the duchesse d'Orléans, known at court as Madame. In her famous correspondence describing life at Versailles, Madame claimed that du Maine was not the son of the king:

I can readily believe that the comte de Toulouse is the King's son; but I have always thought that the duc du Maine is the son of Terme [a member of the court], who was a false knave, and the greatest tale-bearer in the Court

Louis XIV showered him with gifts and titles and hired the best tutors for him. The maréchal du Luxembourg, a famous military strategist, was put in charge of the child's military training. Despite this, Louis-Auguste never became more than a mediocre soldier. He was made Grand Maître de France.

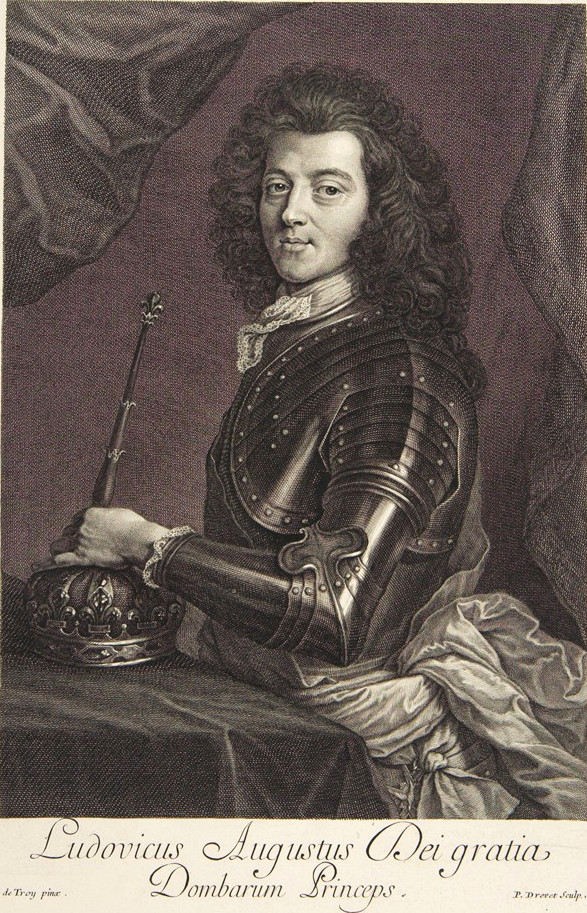
Portrait engraved in 1703 by Pierre Drevet after a painting by François de Troy. The engraving shows Maine as he wished to be seen: a soldier and sovereign Prince of the Dombes with a closed crown and sceptre. The Latin title, Ludovicus Augustus Dei gratia Dombarum Princeps, also promoted his claim, but in France there was an unwillingness to regard him as anything more than a duke. Later, after the death of Louis XIV, the regent, Philippe d'Orléans, had the engraved plate destroyed. Very few prints survive. This copy is made from a print at Harvard University's Fogg Museum.

The king also blackmailed his cousin, the wealthy La Grande Mademoiselle, into ceding some of her estates to du Maine in return for the liberation of her imprisoned lover, Antoine Nompar de Caumont, Duke of Lauzun. As a result, Louis-Auguste became the comte d'Eu, sovereign Prince of the Dombes, and duc d'Aumale. He also received the governorship of Languedoc and was awarded the Order of the Holy Spirit. In April 1684 du Maine represented the king at the wedding of the Duke of Savoy, Victor Amadeus II to du Maine's cousin, Anne Marie d'Orléans. In 1688, Louis Auguste was made a capitaine général des galères (General of Galleys).

== Marriage ==
Several potential brides were considered for him, including his first cousin, Élisabeth Charlotte d'Orléans, the only daughter of his uncle, Monsieur and his enemy, Madame, who was horrified at the prospect of her daughter marrying a bastard. However, the Grand Condé, a more distant relative of the king but still France's premier prince du sang, was willing to overlook the discrepancy in social status. So du Maine was allowed to choose among the three unmarried daughters of Condé's son, the duc d'Enghien. He chose Louise Bénédicte, Mademoiselle de Charolais, over her sisters, Anne Marie, Mademoiselle de Condé and Marie Anne, Mademoiselle de Montmorency (later duchesse de Vendôme). Mademoiselle de Condé was quite upset, as she had her heart set on marrying du Maine:

Monsieur le Prince had three daughters for him [du Maine] to choose from, and an extra quarter of an inch of stature made him prefer the second. All three were extremely small; the eldest [Anne Marie] was beautiful, and full of sense and wit. The incredible constraint, to say the least of it, in which the strange temper of Monsieur le Prince kept everyone who was subject to his yoke, made the choice of her sister a cause of bitter heartburning to her

On 19 May 1692, Louis-Auguste and Anne Louise Bénédicte were married in a ceremony at the Palace of Versailles. Presided over by the Cardinal de Bouillon, the guest of honour was the exiled James II of England. Madame de Montespan, who had fallen out of favour with the king after the Affaire des Poisons, did not attend her son's wedding. The duc du Maine received a gift of one million livres from his father at his wedding. His bride was given a hundred thousand livres in cash, with clothes and jewels worth an additional two hundred thousand livres.

The marriage proved unhappy. Louise Bénédicte felt disgraced by her marriage to a légitimé de France and was often unfaithful. As the groom and bride were both physically handicapped (Louise Bénédicte had a bad right arm and Louis had a lame leg), people at court snickered:

Voici l'union d'un boiteux et d'une manchote. Ah, le beau couple! (Behold the union of a cripple and a penguin. Ah, the beautiful couple!)

The union, despite open discord, produced seven children, but only three lived to adulthood. Their only surviving daughter, baptised at Versailles on 9 April 1714, was known as Mademoiselle du Maine and named Louise-Françoise de Bourbon.

In 1707, Madame de Montespan died, and the duc du Maine inherited a large portion of her fortune, including the Château de Clagny, built for her by his father near the château at Versailles. Unlike his younger siblings, the duke did not express any emotion or remorse at the loss of his mother, as he considered Madame de Maintenon to have been more of a mother to him throughout his youth.

== Prince du Sang ==
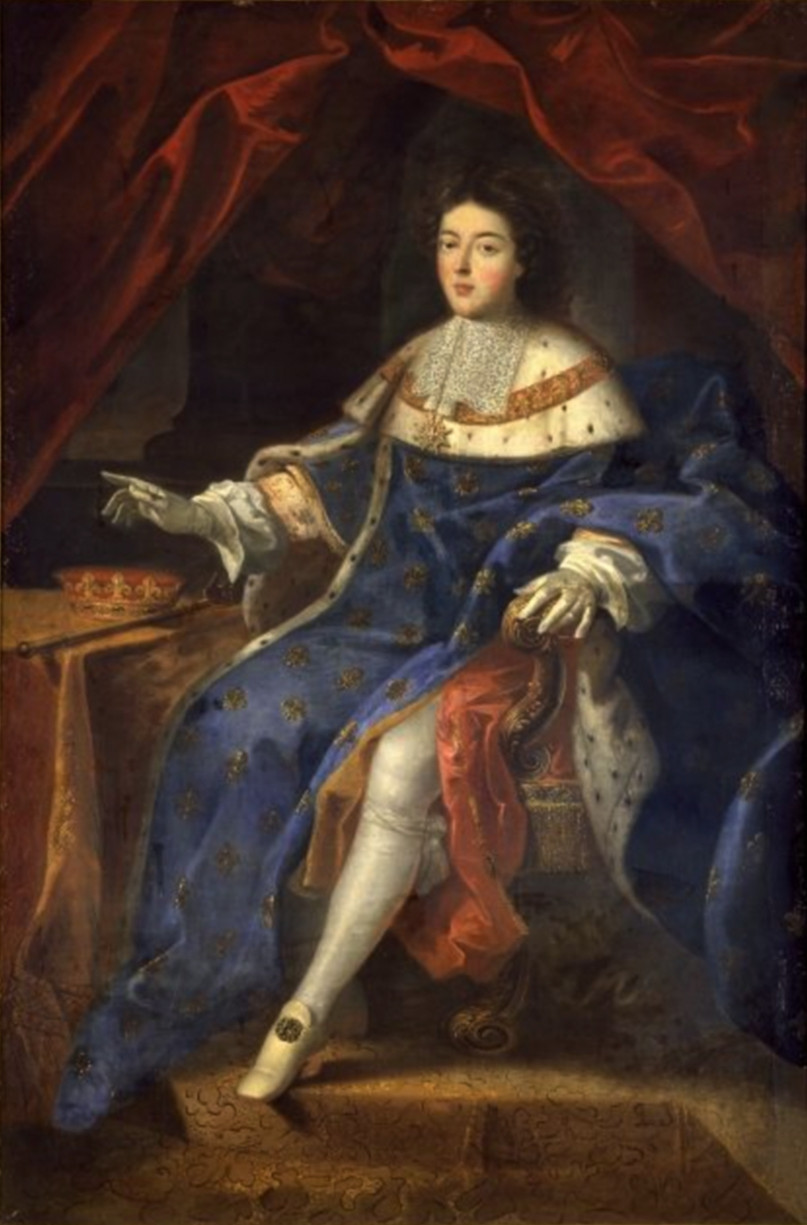
The Duke of Maine, by Jacques Antoine Friquet de Vauroze, 1698.

In July 1714, pressed by Maintenon, Louis XIV raised Louis-Auguste and his younger brother, the comte de Toulouse, to the rank of princes du sang, and compelled the Parlement of Paris to acquiesce to their being placed in the line of succession to the French throne, following all of the legitimate lines of the House of Bourbon.

In August 1715, Louis XIV's health deteriorated drastically. On 22 August, he was unable to attend a troop parade in the gardens of Versailles, and he ordered the duc du Maine to take his place at this event. This public display of the Maine's "promotion" greatly concerned his rival, the duc d'Orléans.

== Cellamare Conspiracy ==
On 1 September 1715, Louis XIV died and was succeeded by his great-grandson Louis, Duke of Anjou as Louis XV. The little boy was the grandson of du Maine's late half-brother Louis, Grand Dauphin. The old king's last will and testament gave the regency to both his nephew and son-in-law the duc d'Orléans and the 45 year old duc du Maine. However, the next day, the duc d'Orléans ensured the annulment of Louis XIV's will in the Parlement of Paris.

Displeased with Orléans' actions, Louis-Auguste, pressured by his ambitious wife, joined in the Cellamare Conspiracy in the hope of transferring the regency to the young King Philip V of Spain, who was the uncle of the boy king Louis XV and a half nephew of du Maine. The plot was named after Antonio del Giudice, Prince di Cellamare, the Spanish ambassador to the French court. After the conspiracy was discovered, du Maine was arrested and imprisoned in the fortress of Doullens, and his wife was exiled to Dijon.

In 1720, the couple was pardoned by the Council of the Regent and was allowed to return to court. After their release from imprisonment in 1720, Louise Bénédicte made an effort to reconcile with her husband, whom she had talked into joining the plot. She remarked:

I owe a full and rightful explanation to M. le Duc du Maine which is more precious to me than my own liberty or life

After their release, Louis-Auguste and his wife led a more subdued, compatible life at the Château de Sceaux, bought by Louis XIV for du Maine, where his wife created a little court attended by popular literary figures of the day. They also had a new home in Paris. On 27 December 1718, before their exile, he and his wife had purchased an unfinished house in Paris on the rue de Bourbon (now rue de Lille) from his wife's sister, Marie Thérèse de Bourbon. It was originally designed by the architect Robert de Cotte, but they had hired a new architect, Armand-Claude Mollet, to enlarge and redesign it. It was completed before their return from exile and became known as the Hôtel du Maine (destroyed 1838).

Louise Bénédicte tried on several occasions to marry off their children. First, she tried to marry their son and main heir, Louis Auguste de Bourbon, to his first cousin Charlotte Aglaé, Mademoiselle de Valois, daughter of du Maine's younger sister, Françoise-Marie de Bourbon. The young Mademoiselle de Valois refused, however.

Later, Louise-Bénédicte tried to marry off Mademoiselle du Maine twice. First, she offered her daughter's hand to the duc de Guise, but that marriage never materialised. She then offered the girl to the widower, Jacques I, Prince of Monaco, who was often at Versailles. Despite offering a large dowry to each man, neither accepted. Mademoiselle du Maine eventually died in 1743, alone and single, at the age of thirty-five. She was buried at the Église at Sceaux.

It was at Sceaux that du Maine died on 14 May 1736 at the age of sixty-six, during the reign of his grandnephew Louis XV, by now a young man of twenty-six years. The House of Bourbon-Maine became extinct at the death of his eldest son, the prince de Dombes, in 1775.

The large du Maine fortune was inherited by their cousin, the duc de Penthièvre, the only son of du Maine's younger brother, Louis Alexandre, Count of Toulouse.

== Honours ==
Legitimised (légitimé de France) 20 December 1673;

- Duc du Maine (1673) and made colonel général des Suisses et Grisons 1674;
- Captain of the Gardes Suisses 3 February 1674;
- Colonel of the Regiment of Infantry of Turenne 13 August 1675;
- Sovereign Prince of the Dombes and comte d'Eu 2 February 1681;
- Governor of Languedoc 29 May 1682;
- Chevalier des Ordres du roi 2 June 1686;
- Général des galères and Lieutenant General of the Seas 15 September 1688;
- Marechal de camp 2 April 1690;
- Lieutenant général on 3 April 1692;
- Wed Louise Bénédicte de Bourbon, princesse du sang
- Colonel of the regiment of the 'Royal-Carabiniers' 1 November 1693;
- Peer of France 1694;
- Grand Master of Artillery 10 September 1694;
- Prince du sang 29 July 1714;
- Superintendent of the education of Louis XV September 1715;
- Stripped of the rank of prince du sang by the Regent, Philippe II, Duke of Orléans July 1717

== Issue ==
- Mademoiselle de Dombes (Palace of Versailles, 11 September 1694 – Palace of Versailles, 26 September 1694).
- Louis Constantin de Bourbon, Prince of the Dombes (Palace of Versailles, 17 November 1695 – Palace of Versailles, 28 September 1698).
- Mademoiselle d'Aumale (Palace of Versailles, 21 December 1697 – Palace of Versailles, 22/24 August 1699).
- Louis Auguste de Bourbon, Prince of the Dombes (Palace of Versailles, 4 March 1700 – Palace of Fontainebleau, 1 October 1755).
- Louis Charles de Bourbon, Count of Eu (Château de Sceaux, 15 October 1701 – 13 July 1775).
- Charles de Bourbon, Duke of Aumale (Palace of Versailles, 31 March 1704 – Château de Sceaux, 2 September 1708).
- Louise Françoise de Bourbon, Mademoiselle du Maine (Palace of Versailles, 4 December 1707 – Château d'Anet, 19 August 1743).
