= Château de Sceaux =

Castle in Sceaux, France

Coordinates: 48°46′28″N 2°18′00″E

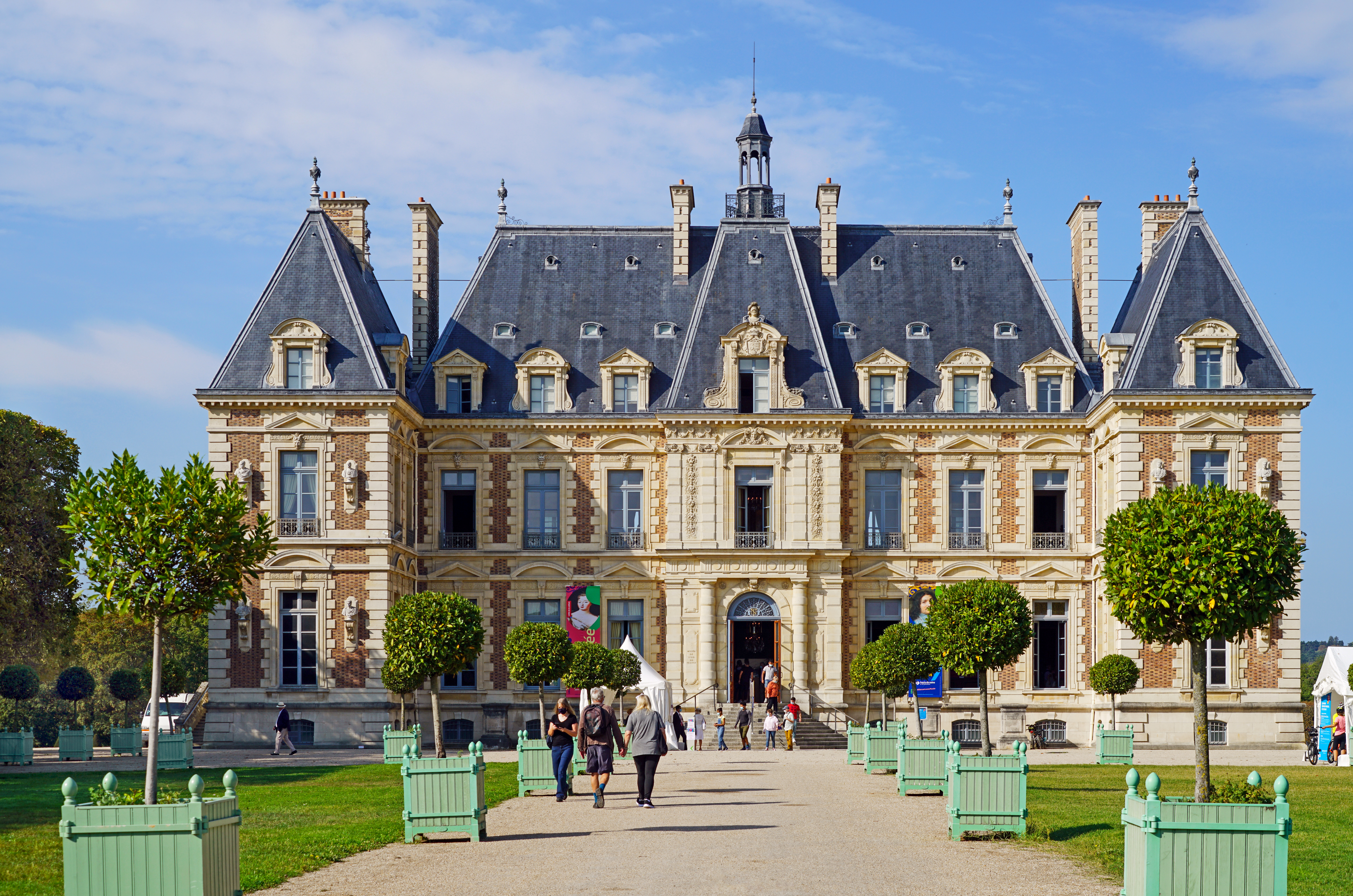
The Château de Sceaux, rebuilt (1856–1862) after the previous building had been demolished in the aftermath of the French Revolution.

The Château de Sceaux (French pronunciation: [ʃɑto d(ə) so]) is a grand country house in Sceaux, Hauts-de-Seine, approximately 10 km (6 mi) south-southwest of the centre of Paris. Situated in a large park laid out by André Le Nôtre, partly in Antony, visitors can tour the house, outbuildings and gardens.

The former château was built for Jean-Baptiste Colbert, Louis XIV's minister of finance, who purchased the domaine in 1670. The present château, designed to evoke the Louis XIII style, dates from the Second Empire. Some of Colbert's outbuildings remain, as well as the bones of the garden layout. The Petit Château operates as the Musée de l'Île-de-France, a museum of local history. The Département des Hauts-de-Seine operates the site as the Musée du Domaine départemental de Sceaux.

== History ==
The seigneurie of Sceaux appears in 15th-century documents, but little remains above ground of the château built for the family Potier de Gesvres in 1597. Colbert turned to some of the premier royal architects and craftsmen to design a seat worthy of his station, the architect brothers Claude and Charles Perrault and Antoine Lepautre, and the premier peintre du roi Charles Le Brun.

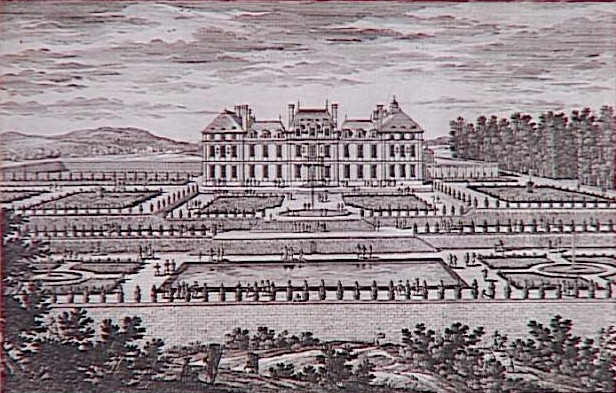
The parterres at Sceaux, engraved by Adam Perelle

Jean-Baptiste Colbert, Marquis de Seignelay, son of Colbert and minister of the Navy, inherited Sceaux in 1683. He added sculpture by François Girardon and Antoine Coysevox. His embellishments to the grounds extended the formal terraced layout, the bones of which remain, and excavated the Grand Canal, a kilometre in length, along the valley bottom. Le Nôtre laid out a main axis centred on the château and descending in a series of terraces to the valley bottom, then rising on the far side. The main axis is crossed by two grand secondary axes at right angles, one delineated by the Allée de la Duchesse and the formal stone cascade that flows down to fill an octagonal basin, the other the Grand Canal.

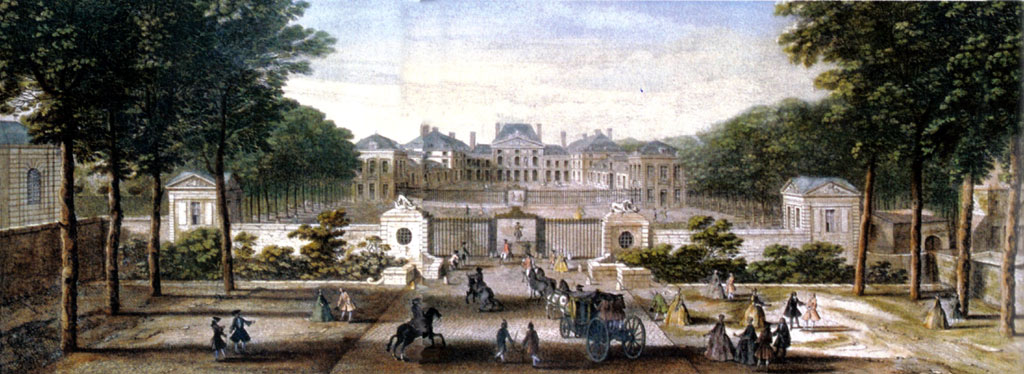
A coloured engraving of Sceaux in the 1740s

Jules Hardouin-Mansart built the Orangerie, which was inaugurated by the King at a fête in 1685. Sceaux was sold in 1699 to Louis's illegitimate son, Louis Auguste, Duke of Maine, whose wife, Anne, Duchess of Maine made it the setting for her glittering salon in the first decades of the eighteenth century, which reached its apogee in the Grandes Nuits of 1714–15, sixteen fêtes of music and opera-ballets that unfolded every two weeks and drew the best musicians of France, under the direction of Jean-Joseph Mouret. The salon at Sceaux attracted the young Voltaire. The Duchess of Maine had the pavilion of the Ménagerie built, to designs by Jacques de La Guépière, and gave it a garden setting, to the north of the château; only its foundations remain.

== Demolition ==
During the French Revolution the property was confiscated as a bien national, its contents sold for the benefit of the nation, and the building bought by M. Lecomte, a merchant of Saint-Malo. Under the Consulate, the original château was demolished, but the pavilion of Aurore, the Orangerie, the stables, and outbuildings were preserved. Crops were grown on Le Nôtre's terraces.

== The restored castle ==
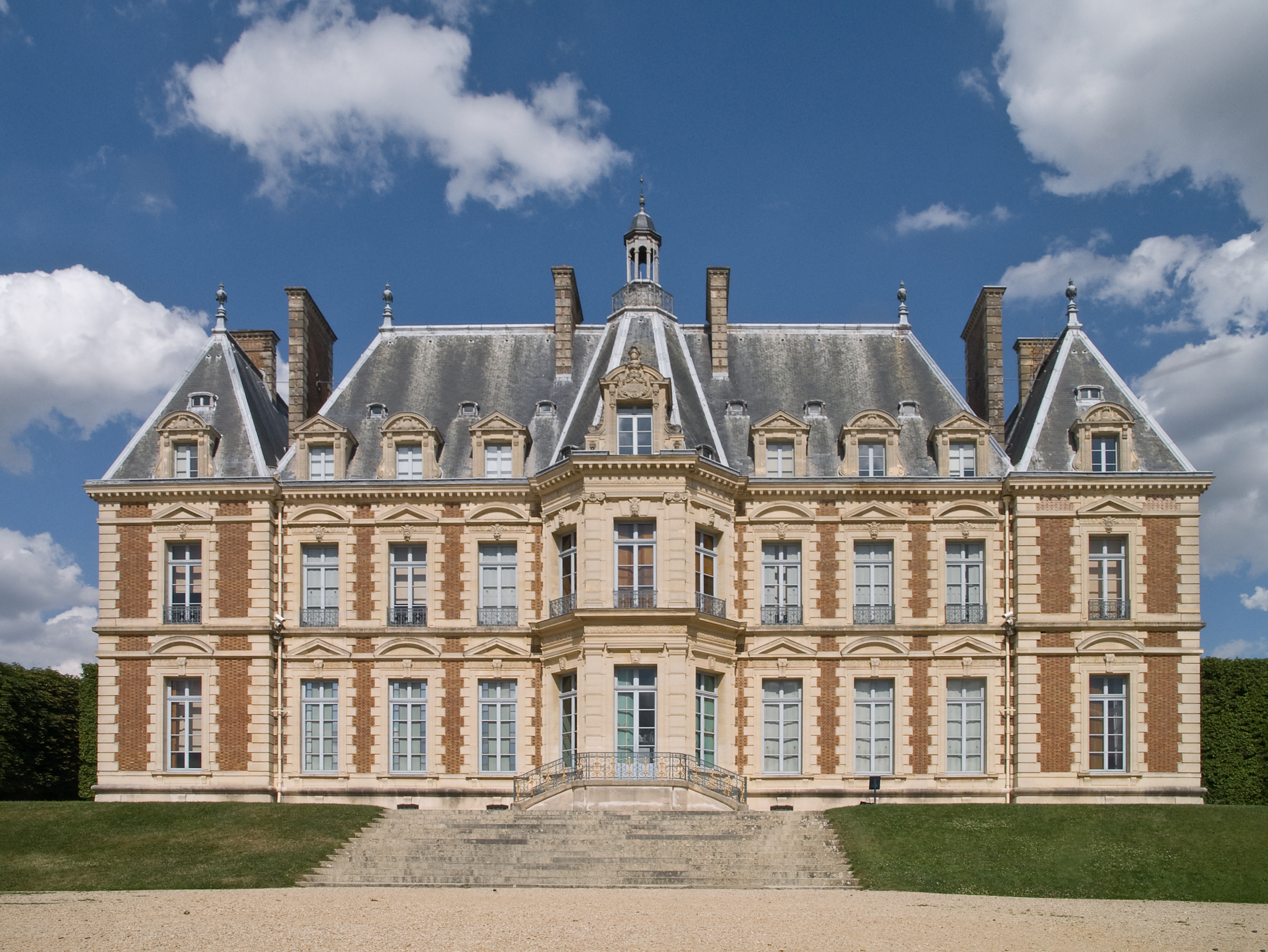
Façade of the Château de Sceaux

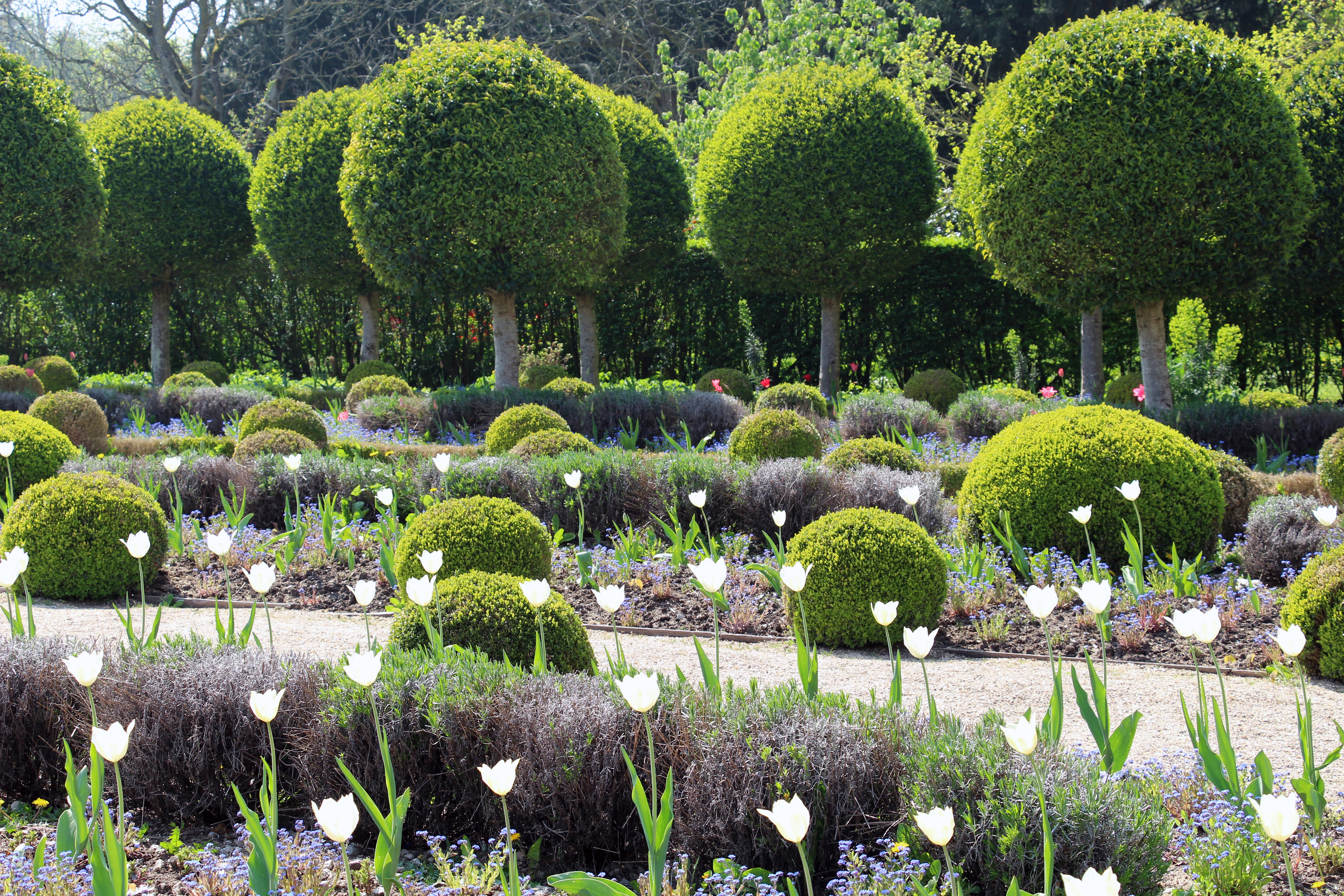
Castle grounds

The duc de Trévise, son of Napoleon's Maréchal Mortier, who had married the daughter of M. Lecomte, inherited the domaine and set to restoring the park and the pavilion and Orangerie. The gardens were restored, with parterres and gravel largely replaced by clipped lawns. Between 1856 and 1858 he erected the present smaller château in brick with stone quoins, designed to evoke the Louis XIII style, designed by the architect Augustin Théophile Quantinet and built by Joseph-Michel Le Soufaché.

In 1922, the heiress of Trévise, princesse de Faucigny-Cystra, planned to give up Sceaux to real estate developers; through the efforts of the mayor Jean-Baptiste Bergeret de Frouville it was preserved and opened to the public of the town that had grown up around the park.

== Museum of Île-de-France ==
Since 2010, the Petit Château houses the Musée de l'Île-de-France. This museum contains one of the largest collections of works by painters of the School of Paris.
