= Ursel =

Ursel is a Flemish surname:

== Place ==
- Ursel, Belgium, village and former municipality in East Flanders.

== Name ==
- Noble house d'Ursel, Duke of Ursel, see too: D'Ursel Castle.
  - Lancelot II of Ursel
  - Charles-Joseph, 4th Duke d'Ursel
  - Marie Joseph Charles, 6th Duke d'Ursel
  - Henri d'Ursel
  - Philippe d'Ursel
  - Léo d'Ursel
- Bob Ursel
- Ursel Bangert
- Ursel Lorenzen
- Jim Ursel

== Other ==
- Ursel Air Base
- D'Ursel Point
