= Charles I Gonzaga =

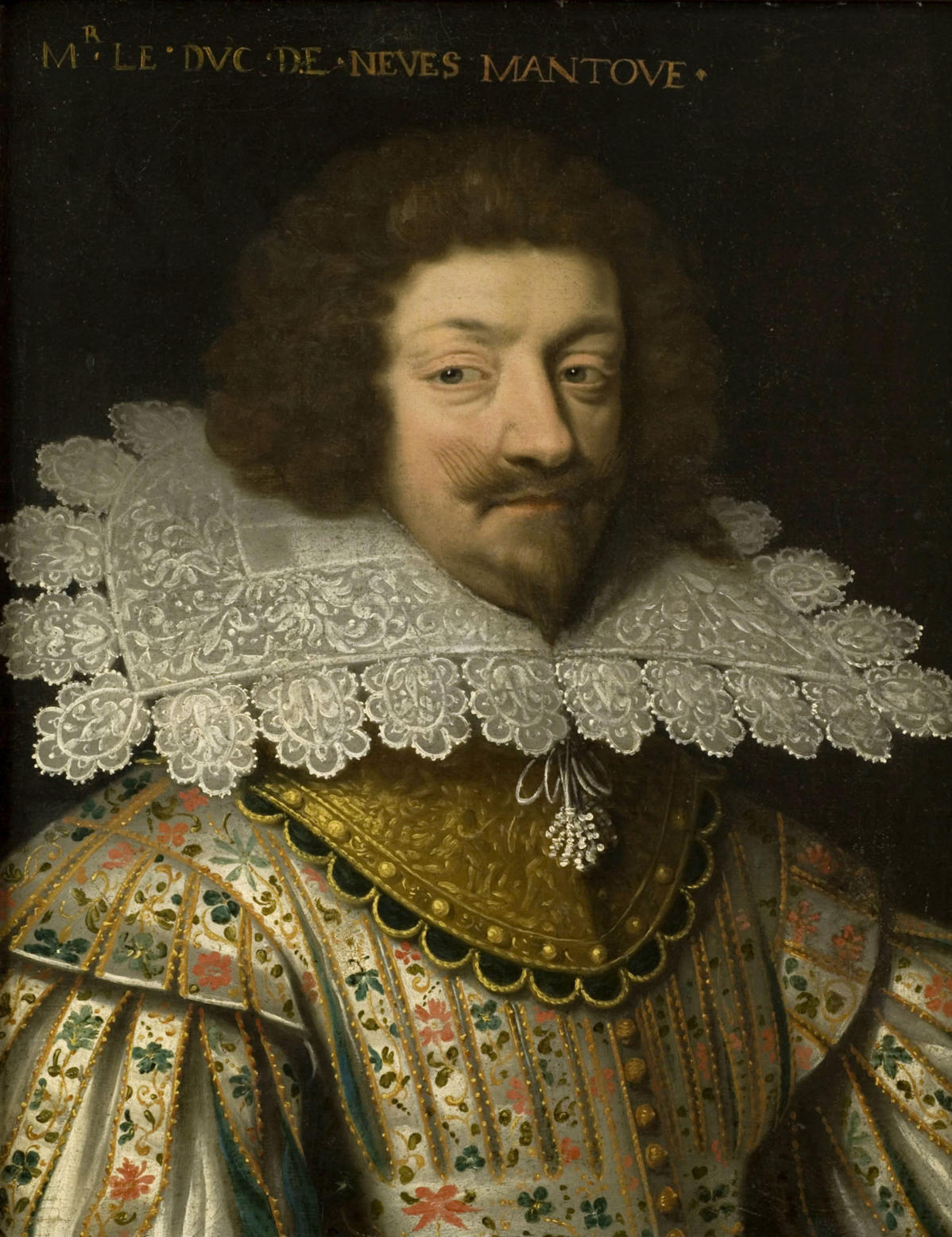
- Portrait by Daniel Dumonstier

Duke of Mantua and Montferrat
- Reign: 25 December 1627 - 22 September 1637
- Predecessor: Vincenzo II Gonzaga
- Successor: Charles II Gonzaga
- Born: 6 May 1580; Paris, Kingdom of France
- Died: 22 September 1637 (aged 57); Mantua, Duchy of Mantua
- Spouse: Catherine de Lorraine-Guise-Mayenne (m. 1599; died 1618)
- Issue Detail: Francis III Gonzaga, Duke of Rethel; Charles, Duke of Nevers; Ferdinand, Duke of Mayenne; Marie Louise, Queen of Poland; Anna, Countess Palatine of Simmern
Names
- Carlo Gonzaga
- House: House of Gonzaga
- Father: Louis de Gonzague
- Mother: Henriette, Duchess of Nevers

Charles I Gonzaga (Italian: Carlo I Gonzaga; 6 May 1580 – 22 September 1637) was Duke of Mantua and Duke of Montferrat from 1627 until his death. He was also Charles III as Duke of Nevers and Rethel, as well as Prince of Arche and Charleville.

== Biography ==
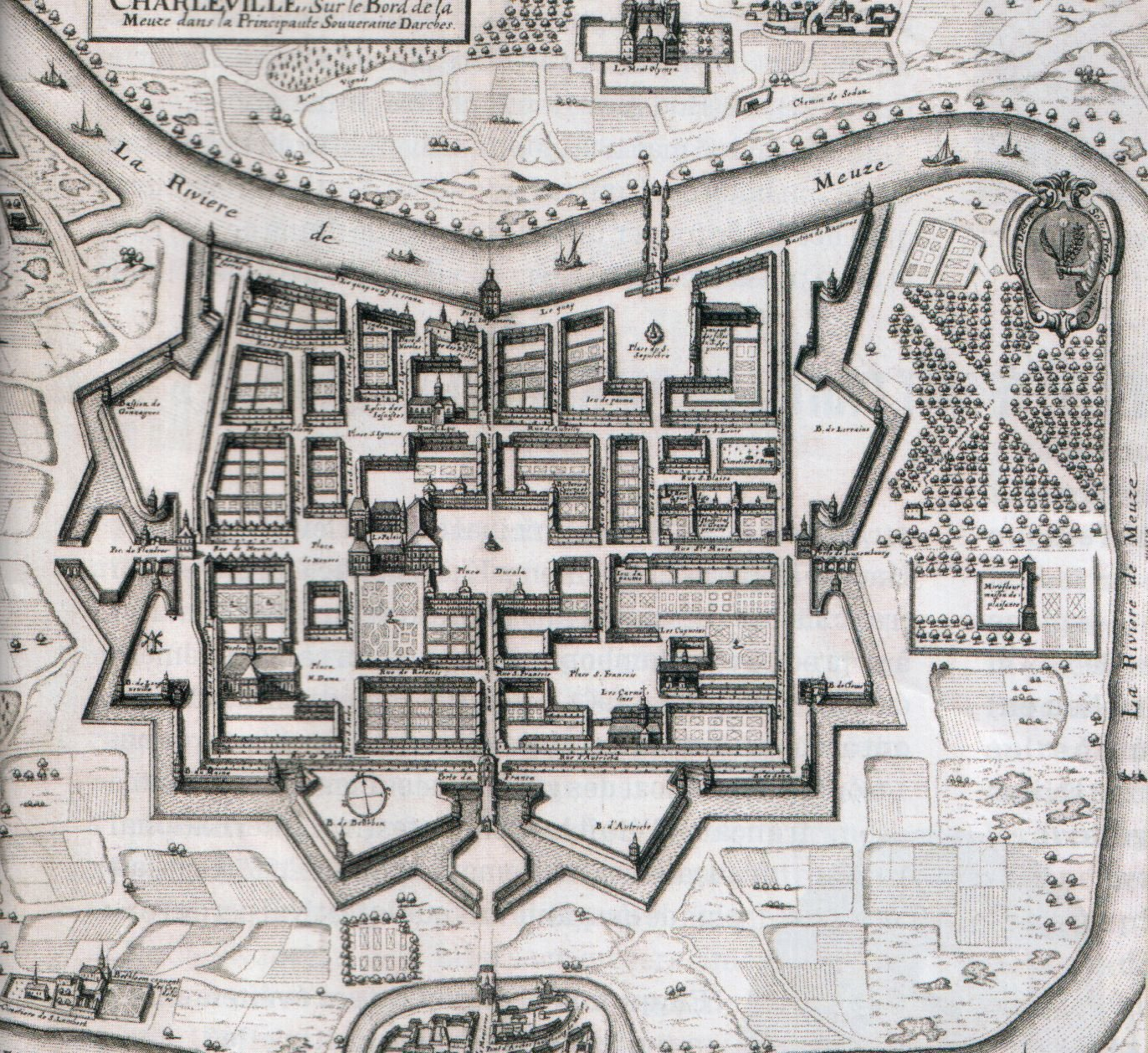
Plans of Charleville in 1625

Born in Paris on 6 May 1580, Charles was the son of Louis de Gonzague, Duke of Nevers, and Princess Henriette de Clèves, Duchess of Nevers. In 1600, as duke of Rethel, he founded, in Nevers, the Order of the Yellow Ribbon, soon forbidden by the King, due to its peculiar character. In 1606, Charles decided the foundation of Charleville and the Principality of Arches ( fr ). He became 1st Prince of Arche and Charleville.

In 1612, Charles, a descendant of the Byzantine Emperor Andronicus II Palaeologus through his grandmother Margaret Paleologa, who was of the line of Theodore I, Marquess of Montferrat, Andronicus's son, claimed the throne of Constantinople, at the time the capital of the Ottoman Empire. He began plotting with Greek rebels, including the Maniots of Greece, who addressed him as "King Constantine Palaeologus". When the Ottoman authorities heard about this, they sent an army of 20,000 men and 70 ships to invade Mani. They succeeded in ravaging the Mani Peninsula and imposing taxes on the Maniots. This caused Charles to move more actively for his crusade. He sent envoys to the courts of Europe looking for support. In 1619, he recruited six ships and some five thousand men, but a fire started by a possible incendiary prevented their journey.

Following the death of the last legitimate male heir of the Gonzaga line in the Duchy of Mantua, Vincenzo II (1627), Charles inherited the title through an agreement. His succession, however, spurred the enmity of Charles Emmanuel I of Savoy, who aimed at the Gonzaga lands of Montferrat, and, above all, of Spain and the Holy Roman Empire, which did not like a pro-French ruler in Mantua. This led to the War of the Mantuan Succession. In 1629 emperor Ferdinand II sent an army to besiege Mantua, Charles left without the promised support from Louis XIII. The siege lasted until 18 July 1630, when the city, already struck by a plague, was brutally sacked for three days. Mantua never recovered from this disaster.

The subsequent diplomatic maneuvers which resulted in the Treaty of Cherasco, allowed Charles, who had fled to the Papal States, to return to the duchy in 1631, although not without concessions to the House of Savoy and to the Gonzaga of Guastalla. The fiscal situation of the Mantuan territory was poor, but he was able to facilitate some economic recovery in the following years.

Charles died in 1637. His successor was his grandson Charles II, initially under the regency of Maria Gonzaga, Charles I's daughter-in-law.

== Children ==
Charles married Catherine of Lorraine-Mayenne, daughter of Charles of Lorraine, Duke of Mayenne and Princess Henriette of Savoy. They had:

- Francis Gonzaga, Duke of Rethel (1606–1622)
- Charles Gonzaga, Duke of Nevers, nominal co-ruler Duke of Mantua (1609 – 14 August 1631) and his heir. Better known as Duke of Nevers and Rethel. Married heiress Maria Gonzaga. They were parents to Eleanor of Mantua consort of the Holy Roman Emperor Ferdinand III, and Charles II, Duke of Mantua and Monferrat.
- Ferdinand Gonzaga, Duke of Mayenne (1610 – 25 May 1632)
- Marie Louise Gonzaga (18 August 1611 – 10 May 1667). Married first Władysław IV Vasa and secondly John II Casimir of Poland
- Benedetta Gonzaga (1614 – 30 September 1637)
- Anne Marie Gonzaga (1616 – 6 July 1684). Married first Henry II, Duke of Guise, and secondly Edward, Count Palatine of Simmern.

== Sources ==
- Boltanski, Ariane (2006). Les ducs de Nevers et l'État royal: genèse d'un compromis (ca 1550 - ca 1600) (in French). Librairie Droz.
- Coniglio, Giuseppe (1967). I Gonzaga. Varese: Dall'Oglio.
- Grendler, Paul F. (2009). The University of Mantua, the Gonzaga, and the Jesuits, 1584–1630. Johns Hopkins University Press.
- Miller, William (1904). "Greece under the Turks, 1571-1684". The English Historical Review. 19 (76 (Oct.)): 646–668. doi:10.1093/ehr/XIX.LXXVI.646.
- Parrott, David (1997). "A "prince souvereign" and the French crown: Charles de Nevers, 1580-1637". In Oresko, Robert; Gibbs, G. C.; Scott, H M (eds.). Royal and Republican Sovereignty in Early Modern Europe: Essays in Memory of Ragnhild Marie Hatton. Cambridge University Press. pp. 149–187.
- Parrott, David (2001). Richelieu's Army: War, Government and Society in France, 1624-1642. Cambridge University Press.
- Polisensky, J. V. (2021). The Thirty Years War. University of California Press.
- Pollak, Martha (2010). Cities at War in Early Modern Europe. Cambridge University Press.
- Sainty, Guy Stair (2018). The Constantinian Order of Saint George and the Angeli, Farnese and Bourbon families which governed it. Madrid, Spain: Boletín Oficial del Estado.
- Spangler, Jonathan (2015). "Points of Transferral: Mademoiselle de Guise's Will and the Transferability of Dynastic Identity". In Geevers, Liesbeth; Marini, Mirella (eds.). Dynastic Identity in Early Modern Europe: Rulers, Aristocrats and the Formation of Identities. Ashgate Publishing. pp. 131–152.
- Williams, George L. (1998). Papal Genealogy: The Families and Descendants of the Popes. McFarland & Company, Inc.
- Wilson, Peter H. (2010). Europe's Tragedy: A History of the Thirty Years War. Penguin Books.

Regnal titles
Preceded by Vincenzo II	Duke of Mantua and Montferrat; 1627–1637	Succeeded by Charles II & III
Preceded by Henriette	Duke of Nevers and Rethel; 1595–1637	Succeeded by Charles II & III
