= Charles-Joseph, 4th Duke d'Ursel =

Charles-Joseph d'Ursel
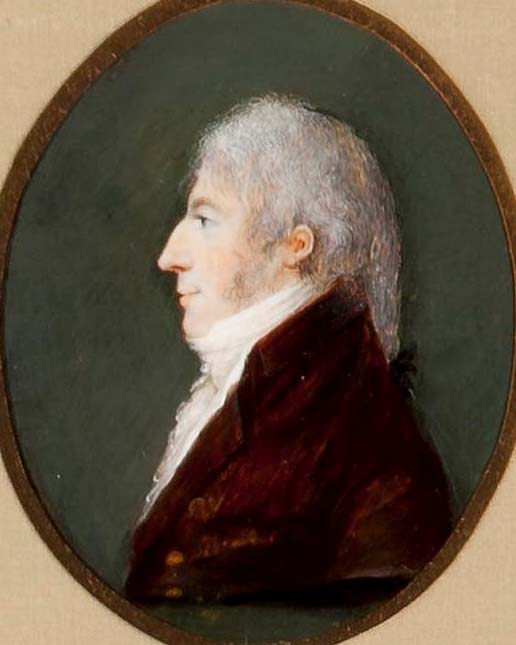
- Charles-Joseph, 4th Duke d'Ursel

Mayor of Brussels
- In office 1810–1814
- Succeeded by: Louis de Wellens

Duke of Ursel
- In office 1804–1860
- Succeeded by: Jean-Charles, 5th Duke d'Ursel

Personal details
- Born: 9 August 1777 Brussels
- Died: 27 September 1860 (aged 83) Hingene
- Party: Catholic Party

Charles-Joseph, 4th Duke d'Ursel and of Hoboken, Prince of Arches and Charleville and Count of Grobbendoncq (9 August 1777 – 27 September 1860) was a statesman and minister in the United Kingdom of the Netherlands and later Belgium.

== Family ==
Charles-Joseph was born as Count d´Ursel was the son of Wolfgang-William, 3rd Duke d'Ursel and Flore Princess of Arenberg, a sister of Louis Engelbert, 6th Duke of Arenberg. He married Josephine-Ferrero Fieschi, Princess of Masseran.

When his father died in 1804, he became the 4th Duke of Ursel and 4th Duke of Hoboken. His sister Louise-Marie married to the Count of Lannoy and is one of the ancestors of Stephanie, Hereditary Grand Duchess of Luxembourg.

=== Children ===
Today all living cadet branches of the current house of Ursel can be linked to him, there are currently 7 cadet branches in the family, most of them founded by his son Ludovic.

Charles-Joseph, 4th Duke d'Ursel

  1. Jean Charles Marie Leon, 5th Duke d'Ursel (1805–1878): 2nd marr. to Madelein d'Harcourt (1812-1842), daughter of Eugène, 8th Duke of Harcourt (1786–1865).
    1. Henri, Count d'Ursel
      x Isabelle de Clermont-tonerre.
    2. Marie Joseph Charles, 6th Duke d'Ursel: President of the Senate of Belgium.
    3. Marie Eugenie Leonarde Sophie, Countess d'Ursel
      x Karl-Heinrich, Count of Schönburg-Glauchau (1832–1898).
    4. Juliette-Louise, Countess d'Ursel (1853-1936)
      x 'François-Joseph- Robert de Bourbon, count of Busset (1848-1918).
    5. Carola, Countess d'Ursel
    6. Marguerite, Countess d'Ursel
    7. Léo, Count d'Ursel
      x Jeanne de Franqueville.
  2. Caroline d'Ursel (1807-1868)
  3. Ludovic-Marie, Count d'Ursel (1809–1886):
    married to Marie Louise Eve Gueulluy de Rumigny, daughter of Marie-Hippolyte de Gueulluy, 2nd Marquess of Rumigny and granddaughter of Édouard Mortier, Duke of Trévise.
    1. Charles, Count d'Ursel; politician and Governor.
    2. Aymard, Count d'Ursel, Lord chamberlain of His Holyness,:
      married to Countess Marie du Chastell.
    3. Hippolyte, Count d'Ursel: Président of the Royal Belgian Society of Géographics.
    4. Auguste, Count d'Ursel.
  4. Marie-August, Count d´Ursel (1815–1878):
    Married to Marie de Croix

== Career ==
In 1810 he was mayor of Brussels, in 1814 and 1815, commissioner-general for internal affairs in the provisional government in the southern Netherlands a position he also held from 1815 to 1819 under King William I. Minister of Works and Public Works. Years later, after the Belgian independence, he was a member of the Senate for the Province of Antwerp (1839–1847) and for the District of Mechelen (1847–1859).

He became a first class member of the Royal Institute of the Netherlands in 1818. This was changed to first class supernumerair' associate in 1841. He joined the successor institute, the Royal Netherlands Academy of Arts and Sciences as foreign member in 1851.

== During the Battle of Waterloo ==
The Duke and his wife were invited to attend the Duchess of Richmond's ball. After the battle had taken place, Brussels was flooded with thousands of wounded officers and men. The Duke invited several Dutch officers to stay at his residence to recover; Captain Veeren, commander of the Light Company of the Dutch 2nd Line Battalion, who was severely wounded leading his company in the attack on La Haye Sainte, wrote his wife two days after the battle: "I thought I would come here in the evening with the intention of going to hospital, but there came to me a gentleman, a Duc (or Duke) d'Ursel, and he insisted that I'd stay with him, but having Van Houten [his 1st Lieutenant, red.] with me, I let him know I would have him stay with me; to which he immediately complied, and we are being very well cared for." The officers remained in the residence of the Duke until they recovered or were transported back to Holland.

== Ancestry ==
Ancestors of Charles-Joseph, 4th Duke d'Ursel

8. Conrad-Albert, 1st Duke d'Ursel
4. Charles, 2nd Duke d'Ursel
9. Elisabeth Eleonora of Salm
2. Wolfgang, 3rd Duke d'Ursel
10. Georg Christian, Fürst von Lobkowitz
5. Eleonora von Lobkowicz
11. Henriette, countess von Waldstein-Wartenburg
Charles, 4th Duke d'Ursel and Hoboken; Count of Grobbendoncq, 7th Prince of Arches and Charleville
12. Léopold, 4th Duke of Arenberg
6. Charles, 5th Duke of Arenberg,
13. Marie-Françoise, princess of Bisaccia, countess d'Egmont
3. Flore, Princess of Arenberg
14. Louis Engelbert, Count de la Marck
7. Louise-Marguerite, Countess de La Marck
15. Marie-Anne-Hyacinthe de Visdeloup

== See also ==
- Ursel family
