= Ursel family =

Belgian noble family of German origin

House of Ursel
- Country: Holy Roman Empire Spanish Netherlands Austrian Netherlands Netherlands Belgium
- Founded: 15th century
- Founder: Gaspar Schetz
- Current head: Stéphane, 10th Duke of Ursel
- Titles: Duke of Ursel; Duke of Hoboken; Count; Imperial Count (personal); Lord of Grobbendonk; Hereditary great forestier of Flanders
- Estates: Château d'Ursel in Hingene, Château du Moisnil in Maizeret, Hôtel d'Ursel (Brussels), Hex Castle, Château de Moulbaix, Château de Linterpoort (Zemst), Château de Durbuy, Moulin de la Marquise

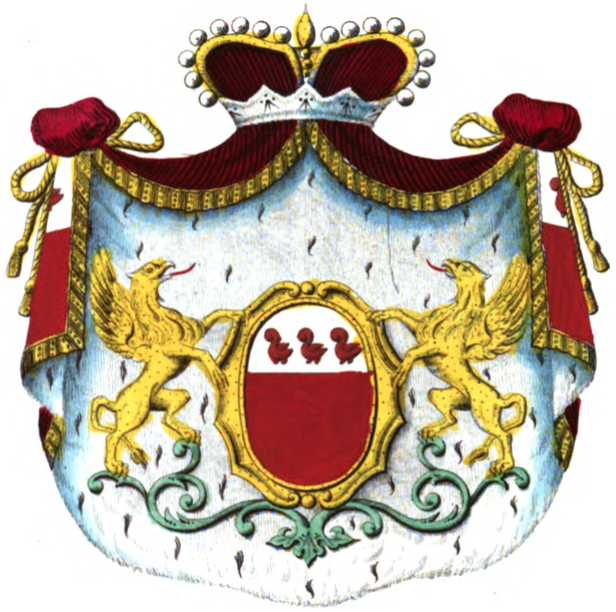
Coat of arms of the House of Ursel, containing 3 red Merlettes

The House of Ursel is an old Belgian noble family of German origin. The Head of the House is styled as Duke of Ursel, while other members are styled as Count/Countess of Ursel.

== History ==
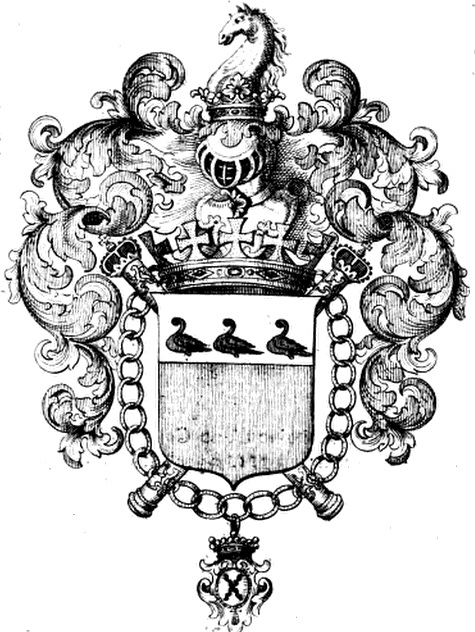
Louis d'Ursel: King of Arms of Flanders

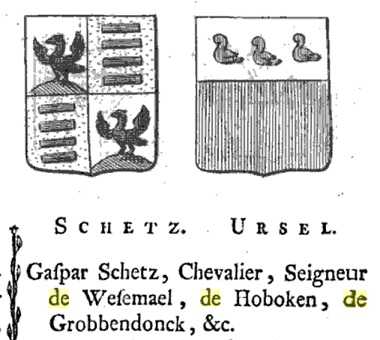
Schetz and Ursel in: Quartiers généalogiques des familles nobles des Pays-Bas.

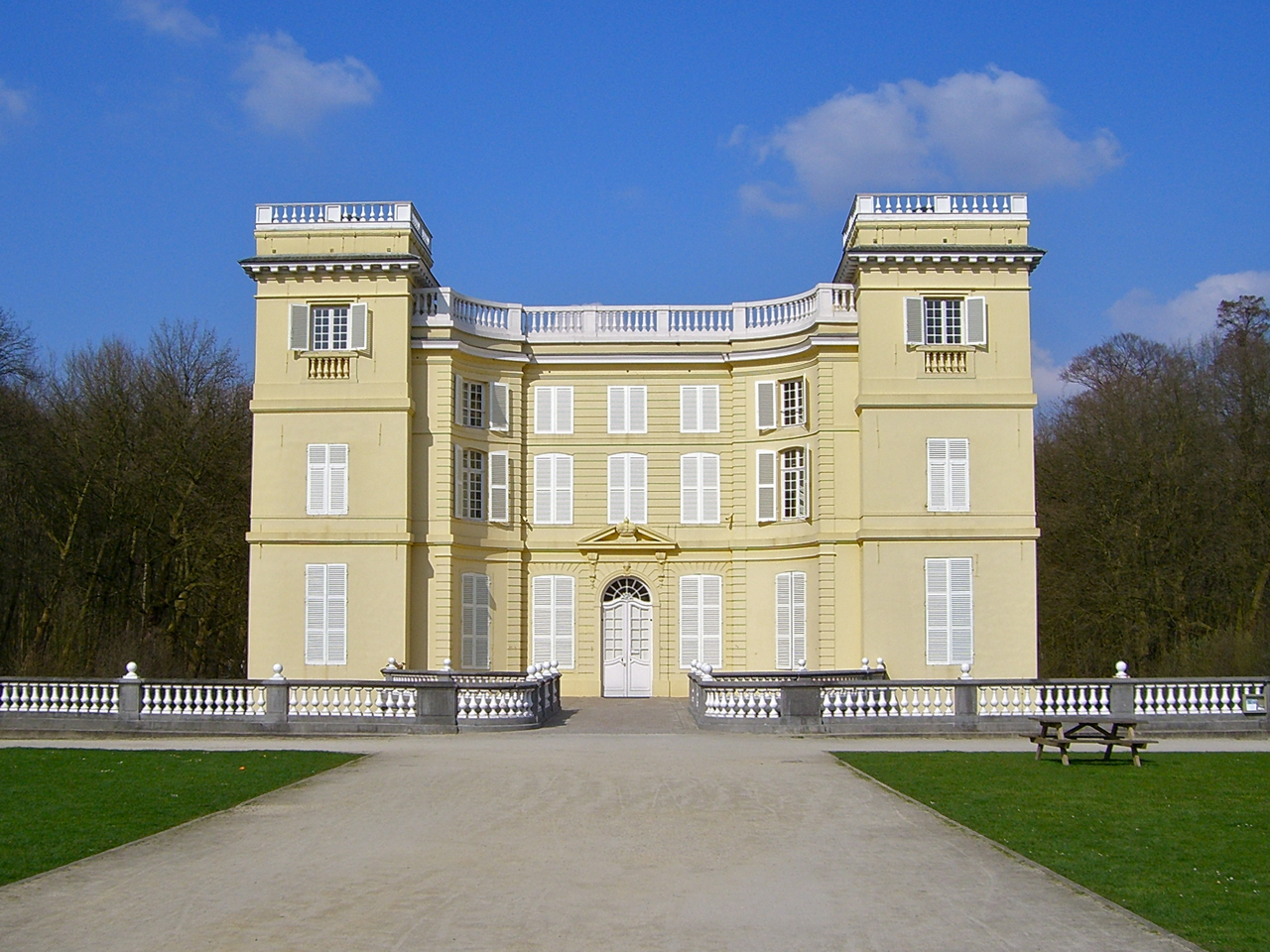
d'Ursel Castle, Hingene redesigned by the Italian architect Giovanni Niccolò Servandoni

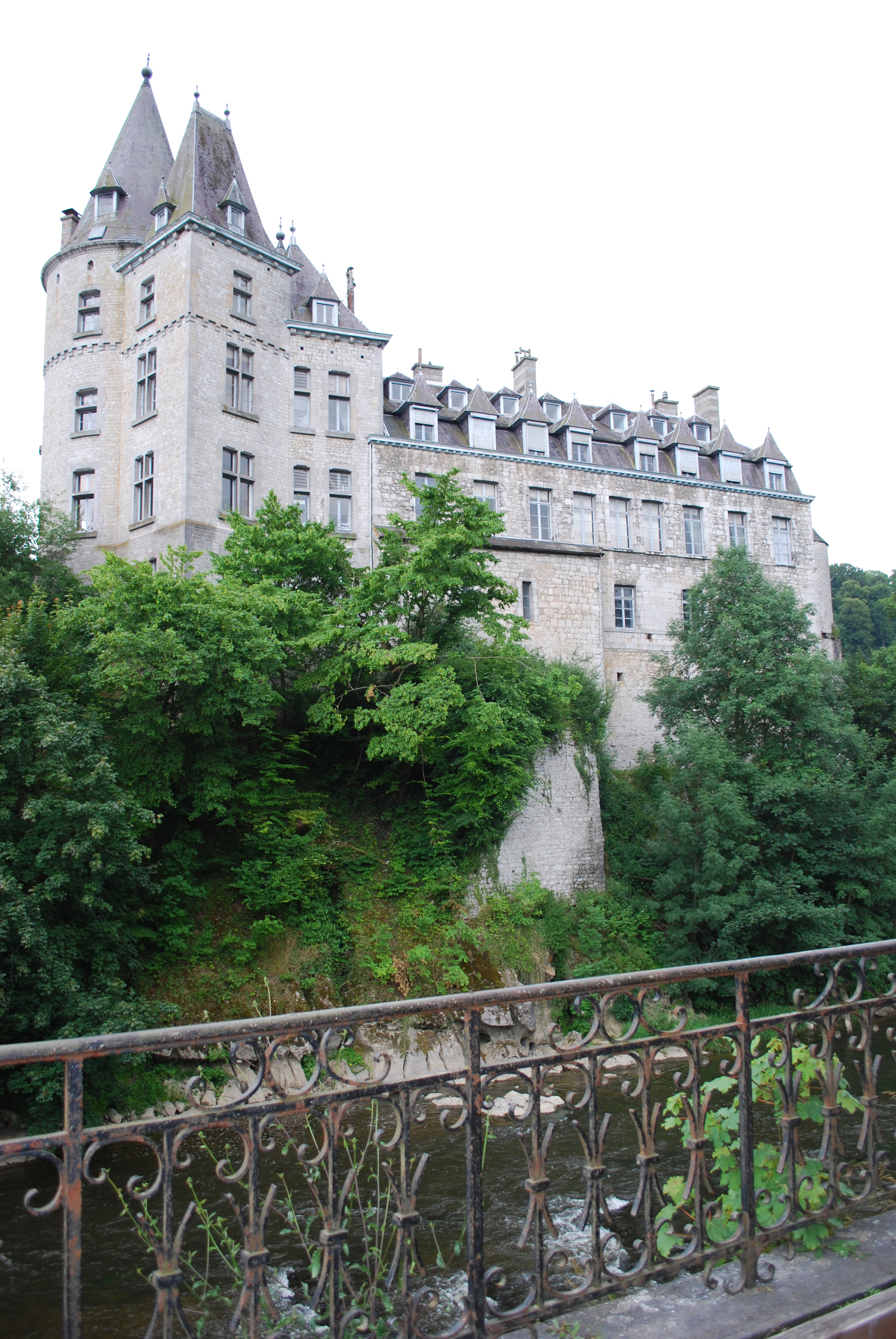
The castle of Durbuy is a private residence of the Count d´Ursel, since the 18th Century.

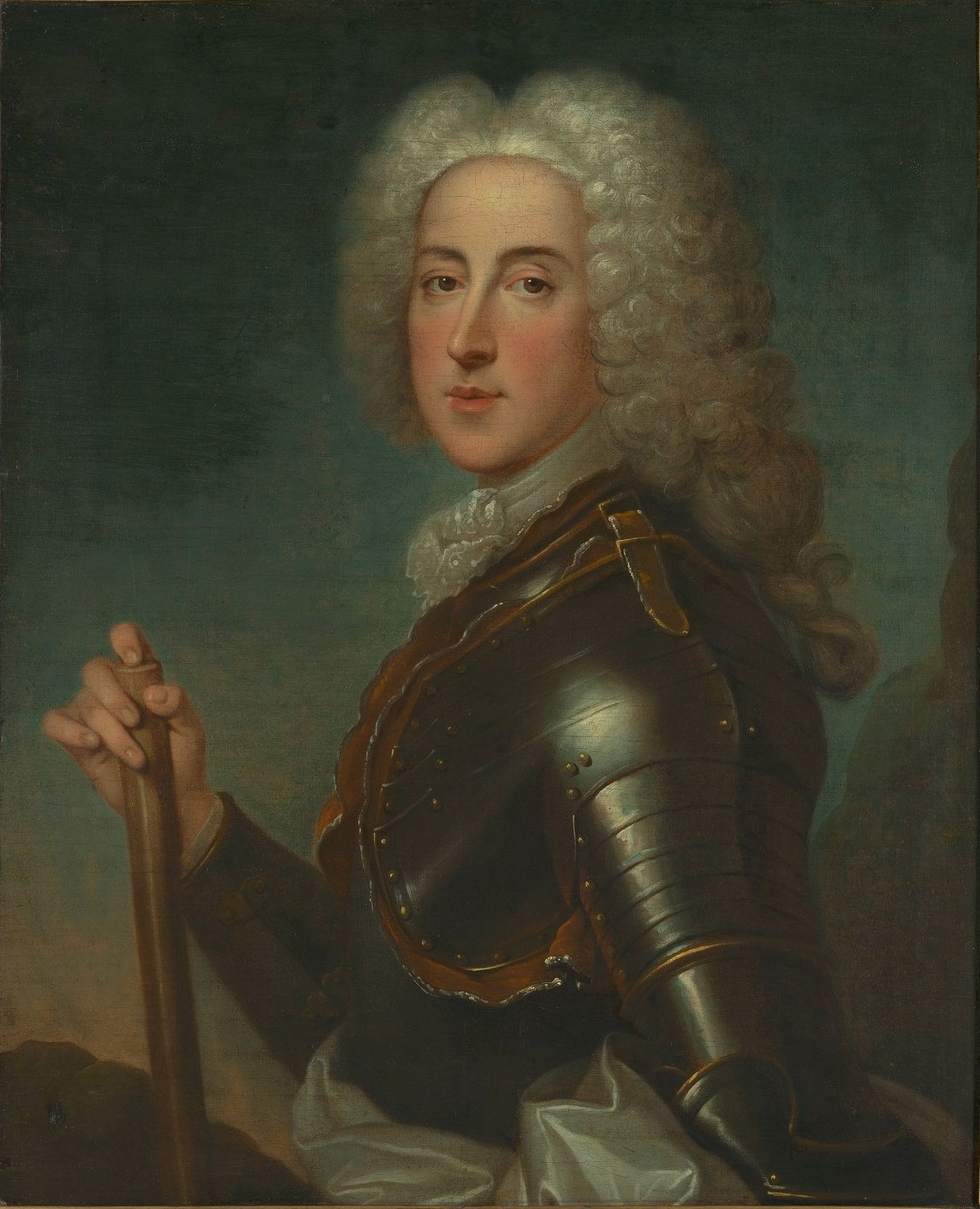
Philip Albert d'Ursel, (1668–1746)

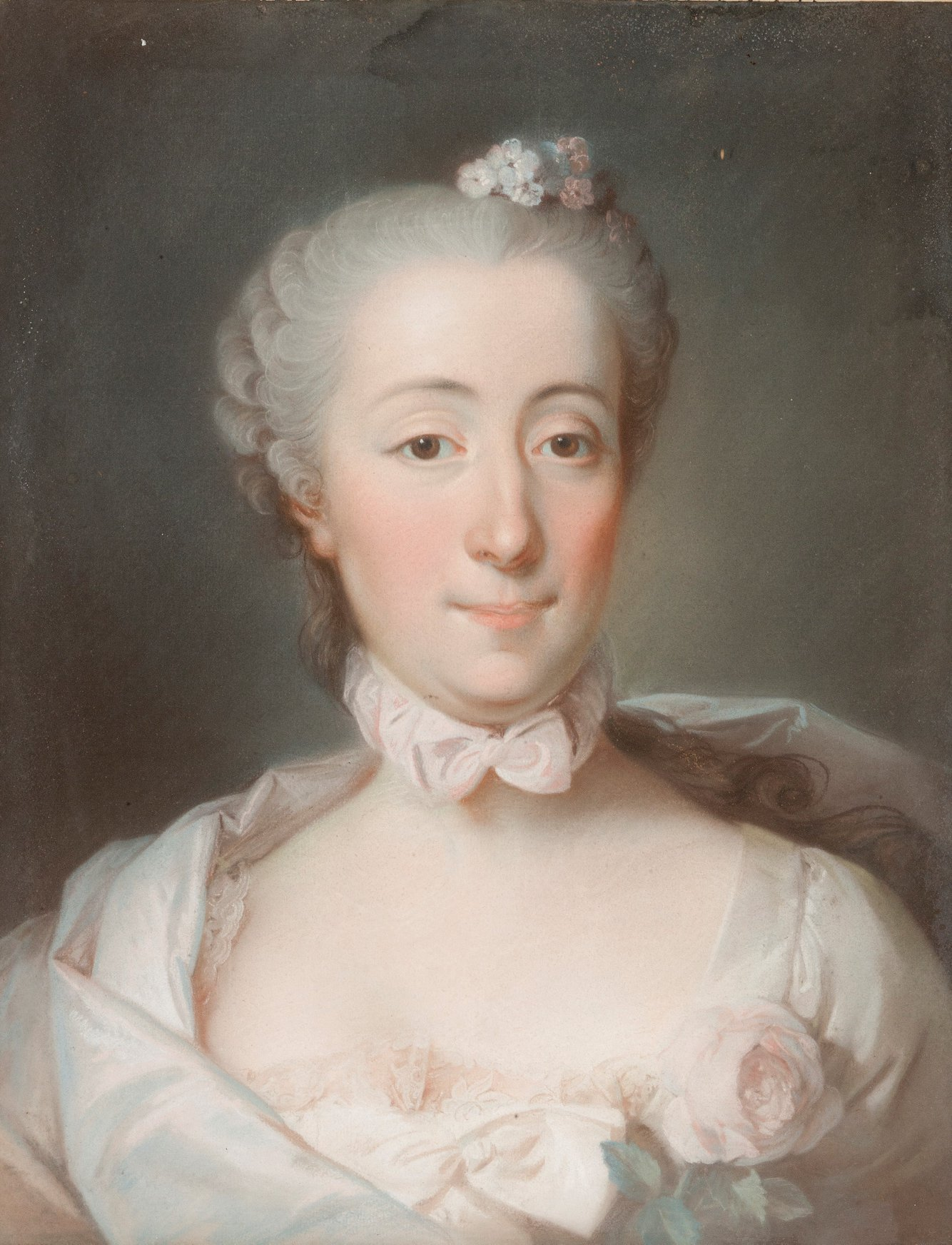
Eleonore von Lobkowitz, Duchesse d'Ursel

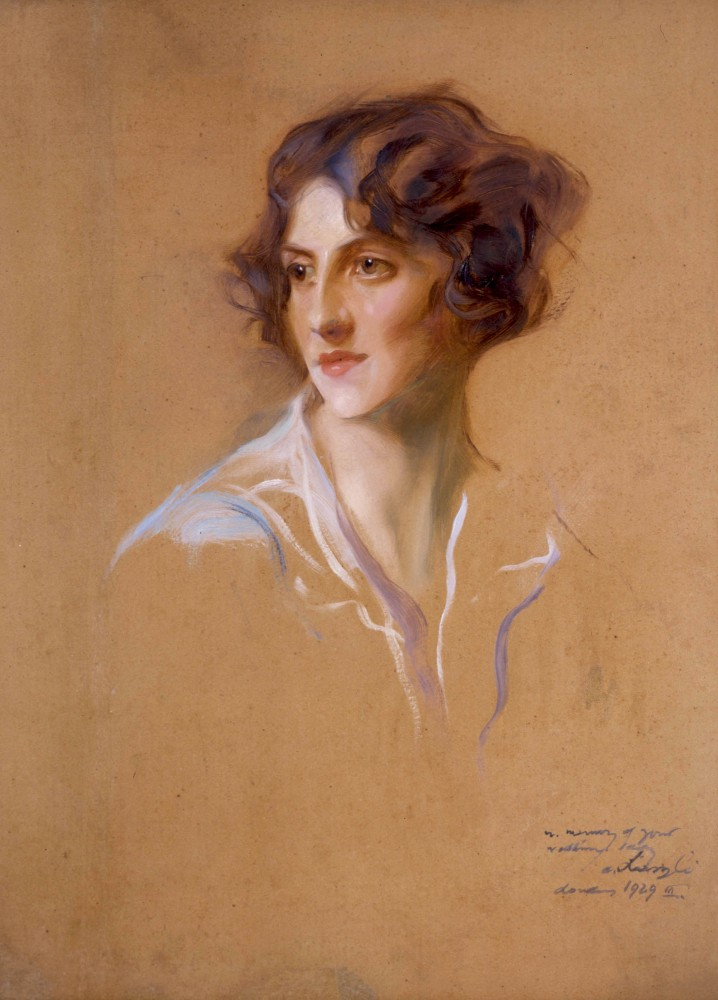
Hedwige de Maupeou (d'Ursel), daughter of Robert d'Ursel

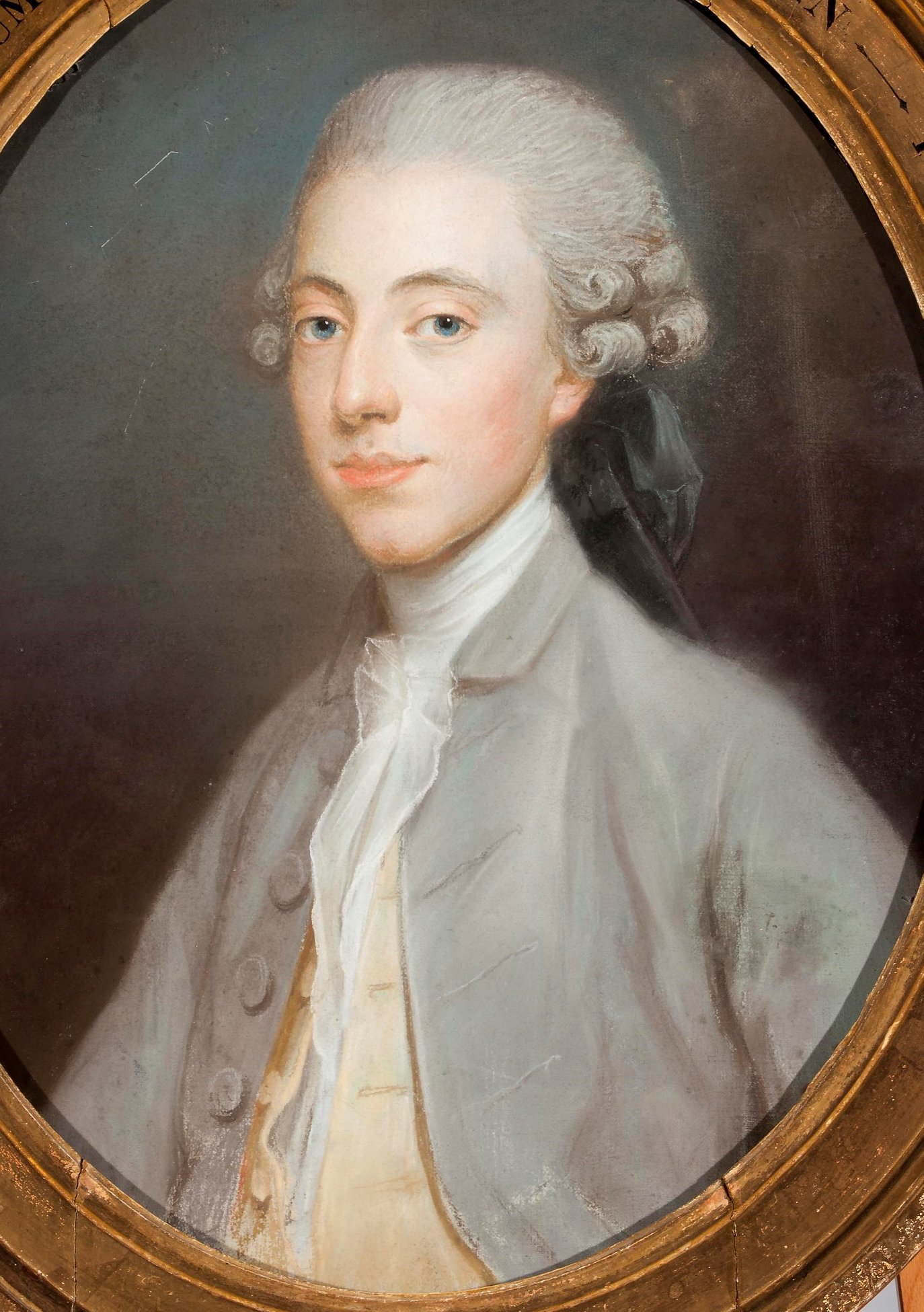
Wolfgang, the 3rd Duke d'Ursel, Prince of Arche and Charleville, Count of Grobbendonk

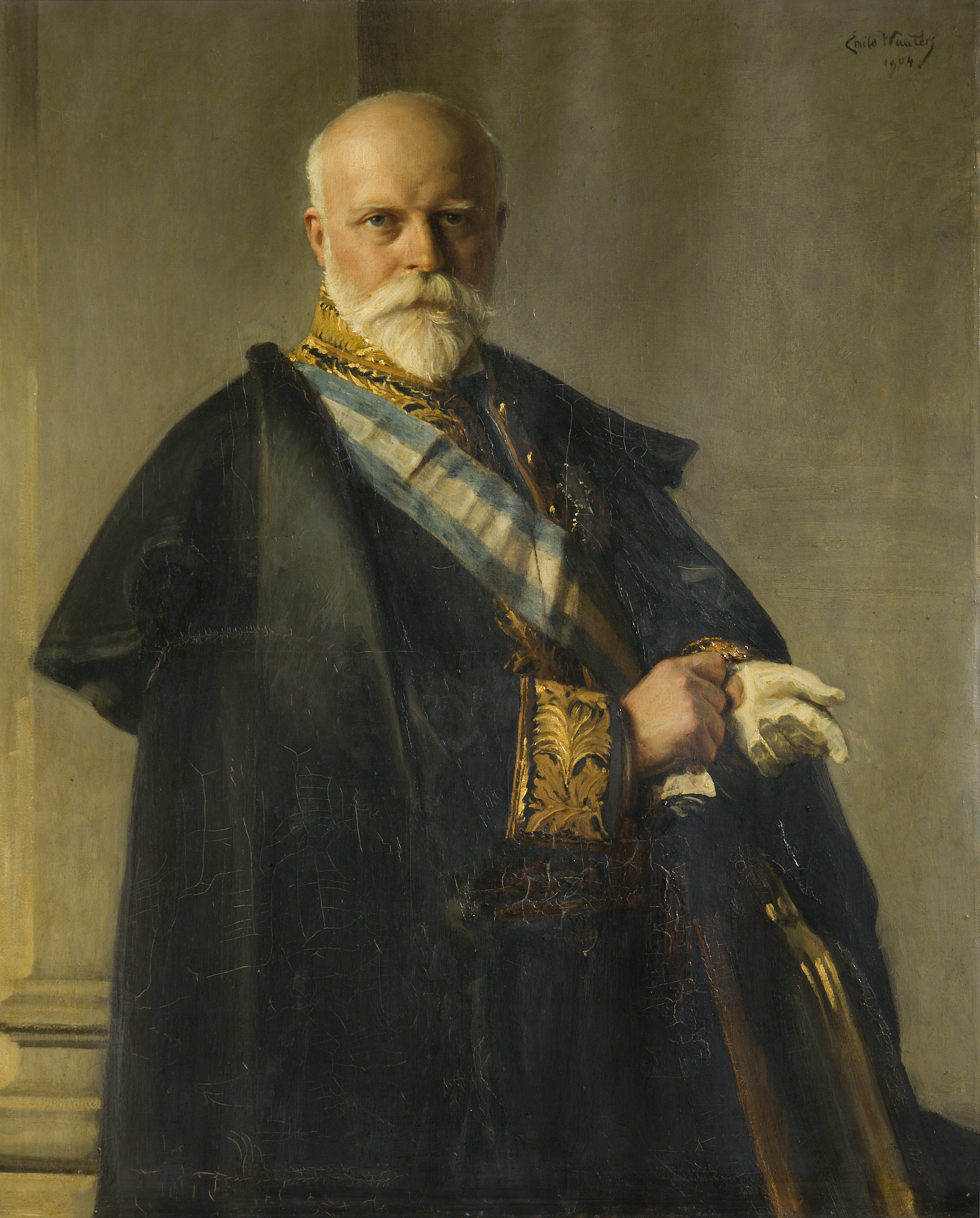
Charles, the 6th Duke of Ursel was president of the Belgian Senate

The Ursel family roots are in Schmalkalden, Germany, and were collateral branch of the House of Schetzenberg. In the late 15th century, some members moved to Hasselt and Antwerp. Amongst the family members we find Gaspard II Schetz, the Lord of Grobbendonck, who married Catherine van Ursel, daughter of Lancelot II of Ursel. The three daughters of Lancelot II died without heirs, and by request of Barbe of Ursel, Conrad III Schetz was adopted by her. His descendants carrying the name 'van Ursel'. The ancestors of Lancelot II came from Antwerp, and held important offices. Conrad Albert, Baron of Wesemael and Lord of Highene was created First Duke of Ursel by imperial decree of Charles VI on 19 August 1716 and later he was created First Duke of Hoboken on 24 April 1717.

During the centuries the family had the privilege of being the hereditary grand veneur and Haut Forestier of Flanders (Forestarius), a ceremonial function at court of the Count of Flanders.

=== Patrimonium ===
Today the Ursel family still holds residence in a few important old castles like Linterpoort Castle, property of count Thibault d'Ursel, Hex Castle property of count Ghislian d'Ursel and the large Castle of the Counts d´Ursel in Durbuy, descendants of Antony Schetz, Count of Durbuy. Moulbaix Castle, residence of the late Aymard, count d'Ursel was recently sold, after the last Countess d´Ursel died. Beerlegem Castle is the private residence of Count Hubert d'Ursel de Bousies, by marriage a descendant of Lopez-Maria Rodriguez d'Evora y Vega, 1st Marquess of Rode, the original Marquess of Rode. Another residence Smissenbroek Castle is the property of Count Augustin d'Ursel de Bousies, this castle comes from the same heritage of Rodriguez d'Evora y Vega and is family property since 1808.

The main summer residence of the family was d'Ursel Castle in Hingene, since the 18th century private property. Even today the main graveyard of the Dukes of Ursel is next to the church of Hingene. The successful restoration of the castle received the Flemish Heritage award.

== Family ==
Members of the House of Ursel are allied to many old and important noble houses of Belgium. Even today these unions give them a large network in society. They are allied by marriages to the houses of Lobkowicz, Salm, Thurn und Taxis, von Arenberg, de Clermont-Tonnerre, de La Trémoille, Cornet d'Elzius, De Croy, de Merode, de la Rochefoucauld, de Riquet, Prince de Caraman-Chimay, de Lannoy, d'Oultremont, von Schönburg-Glauchau, de Brouchoven de Bergeÿck, de Spoelberch, de Broqueville, Visart de Bocarmé, de Hemricourt de Grunne, von Hohenlohe, de Villenfagne de Vogelsanck, de Montpellier de Vedrin, de Bèthune-Hesdigneul.

=== Titles ===
The head of the family still holds old recognised titles, given from father to son for generations.

- Count of Grobbendonk, by Imperial Decree, Ferdinand III since 1638.
- Count of the Holy Roman Empire, by Imperial Decree, Ferdinand III since 1638.
- Duke of Ursel, by imperial Decree since 1716.
- Duke of Hoboken, By imperial Decree since 1717.
- Prince of Arches and Charleville; Principauté d'Arches, inherited from the Princes zu Salm.

== Genealogy ==
=== Descendants Renout, Mayors of Antwerp ===
Reinout van Ursel/Ursene is considered the first Knight of Ursel, he was married to Sapientia Vele Roggemans.

  - Lancelot of Ursel, Lord of Asscherayen (Asschereyen/As-Schreyhane), m. Joanne, lady of Corswarem.
  - John of Ursel, alderman of Antwerp, m. Beatrix d'Alleyns.
    - John II of Ursel, Lord Mayor of Antwerp, m. Isabelle de Colesoyne
      - Lancelot I of Ursel, alderman of Antwerp, m. Cecilia, Lady of Diest
        - John III of Ursel, alderman of Antwerp, m. 1st Maria vander Voort, 2nd Mary Pots
          - Maria of Ursel, married Martin, son of Henri van de Werve.
            - Anne van de Werve, married to Jacques de Brimeu, Lord of Poederlee.
              - Maria of Brimeu, Lady of Poederlee: married Conrad II Schetz.
                - Julianne Schetz: married Robrecht Tucher, knight and mayor of Antwerp.
          - Lancelot II of Ursel, Lord Mayor of Antwerp, m. 1st. Barbara of Lier, 3rd Adriana Rockox, daughter of Adriaan Nicolaas Rockox.
            - Catherine of Ursel, m. Gaspard II Schetz, (1513–1580), oldest son of Erasmus II Schetz, Lord of Grobbendonk.
              - Conrad III Schetz, (1553–1632): 1st Baron of Hoboken
            - Mary of Ursel, died 1601: marr. Ambrose Tucher, buried inside St-James.
              - Robrecht Tucher: Married Julianna Schetz, daughter of Conrad II Schetz.
                - Joannes II Antonius Tucher: Lord Mayor of Antwerp.
            - Barbe of Ursel, last heir of her father Lancelot II, she adopted her nephew, as heir of Ursel, Conrad III Schetz, (1553–1632) 1st Baron of Hoboken.

=== Barons of Hoboken ===
Conrad III Schetz, (1553–1632), 1st Baron of Hoboken was the son of Gaspard II and Catharina van Ursel. He named himself Conrad d'Ursel after 1617.

  - Conrad, 1st Count of Ursel, 2nd Baron of Hoboken, Vicomte of Vives-St-Eloy (1592-1659) : became a Count of the Holy Roman Empire by Imperial Decree of Ferdinand III in 1638. Married to Anne Maria, daughter of Jean de Roblès, 1st Count of Annappes and former Noble Canonesse of Nivelles.
    - François, 2nd Count of Ursel, 3rd Baron of Hoboken (1626 - 1696): Grand Forrestier of Flanders, in service of Charles II of Spain, married to Honorine, Lady of Hornes-Bassignies.
      - Anne-Hyacinthe d'Ursel: married to François-Sigmund, son of Lamoral II Claudius Franz, Count of Thurn and Taxis
      - Marie-Françoise d'Ursel †1720: married to Guillaume Henri de Mélun, Marquess of Richebourg.
      - Angélique-Florence d'Ursel: married the Marquess de Bournonville.
      - Conrad-Albert, 1st Duke d'Ursel (1665–1738)

=== Duke of Hoboken (Imperial Decree of 1717) ===
Simplified genealogy of the generations and direct line of Dukes of Ursel upon today.

==== Austrian and Holland period ====
Conrad-Albert, 1st Duke d'Ursel (1665–1738):
He married Eleonore Christine Elisabeth zu Salm, daughter of Charles Theodore, Prince of Salm and noble lady of the Starry Cross.

1. Charles, 2nd Duke d'Ursel (1717–1775):
  married to Eleonora von Lobkowicz, daughter of Georg Christian, Fürst von Lobkowitz and Countess Henriette von Waldstein-Wartenberg (1702 - 1780).
  1. Wolfgang-William, 3rd Duke d'Ursel (1750–1804).
    1. Charles-Joseph, 4th Duke d'Ursel (1777–1860):

==== Kingdom of Belgium ====
Charles-Joseph, 4th Duke d'Ursel (1777–1860):
Married to Louise-Victoire Ferrero Fieschi, princess of Masserano.

1. Léon, 5th Duke d'Ursel (1805 – 1878).:
  married to Sophie d'Harcourt (1812-1842), daughter of Eugène, Duke of Harcourt.
  1. Marie Charles Joseph, 6th Duke d'Ursel (1848 – 1903).
    1. Robert-Marie, 7th Duke d'Ursel ( 1873 – 1955):
      1. Henri, 8th Duke d'Ursel, (1900 – 1974):
        1. Antonin, 9th Duke d'Ursel, (1925 - 1989)
          1. Stéphane, 10th Duke d'Ursel, (1971 -)
            1. Matisse, Count d'Ursel. (2001-)

=== Count d'Ursel ===
Cadet family members are to beknown as Count or Countess d'Ursel.

- Antoine d'Ursel, head of Comet Escape Line in World War II. Died by drowning in December 1943.
- Jean Count d'Ursel, died on 16 March 1945 in Flossenbürg.
- Jeanne Lejeune de Schiervel, countess d'Ursel died in Ravensbruck.
- Louis Marie Alexandre Count d'Ursel, Diplomat during the second WW.
- Antoine, Count d'Ursel (23 November 1953 ) Chevalier de Justice / Royal Commission for Luxembourg
- Thibault, Count d'Ursel (5 June 1980), married to Désirée zu Hohenlohe-Langenburg and son in law of Prince Alfonso of Hohenlohe-Langenburg.
- Michel, Count d´Ursel, mayor of Heks.
- Anne Charlotte, Countess d'Ursel, member of the Brussels parliament.
- Barbara d'Ursel de Lobkowicz, politician.
- Charles, count d'Ursel grandfather of Philippe, Count d'Ursel (1920-2017)
- Léo, count d'Ursel; Belgian diplomat.
- Aymard, count d'Ursel; secret Chamberlain.
- Hippolyte, count d'Ursel, (1850-1937): member of the Senate. Honoured in the D'Ursel Point.
- Count John Cornet d’Elzius, son of countess Colette d´Ursel, ambassador to the Holy See.

== See also ==
- List of noble families in Belgium
