= Ferdinando Gonzaga =

Ferdinando Gonzaga, Duke of Mantua (1587–1626), was the 6th Duke of Mantua.

Ferdinando Gonzaga may also refer to:

- Ferdinando Gonzaga Prince of Molfetta (1507–1557), alias Ferrante I Gonzaga
- (Ferdinando) Ferrante Gonzaga, Marquess of Castiglione (1544–1586), first marquess of Castiglione delle Stiviere
- Ferdinand, Duke of Mayenne (1610–1632), son of Charles II Gonzaga, Duke of Nevers
- Ferdinando Tiburzio Gonzaga (1611–1672), bishop of Mantua
- Ferdinando I Gonzaga (1614–1675), third marquess of Castiglione
- Ferdinando II Filippo Gonzaga (1643–1672), third prince of Bozzolo
- Ferdinando II Gonzaga (1648–1723), last prince of Castiglione
- Ferdinando Carlo Gonzaga, Duke of Mantua and Montferrat (1652–1708), 10th and last Duke of Mantua
