= Hippolyte d'Ursel =

Belgian politician and historian

Count Marie Hippolyte Adrien Ludovic d'Ursel (Brussels, 17 November 1850 – 9 December 1937) was a Belgian politician and historian.

== Family ==
A cadet member of the Ursel family, he was a grandson of Charles-Joseph, 4th Duke d'Ursel. His maternal grandfather was Marie-Hippolyte de Gueulluy, Marquis de Rumigny. He married Georgine de Rouillé (1859–1926), and they had several children.

== Career ==
For six years he served as a member of the Belgian Chamber of Representatives (1894–1900), and as a member of the Catholic Party he represented Brussels in the Senate from 1905 to 1908.

Count d'Ursel was historian and wrote several works, on family history and Belgium.

The D'Ursel Point is named in his honour.

== Affiliations ==
- President of the Belgian Anti-Slavery Society.
- President of the Royal Belgian Society of Géographics.
- Commissioner of the Exposition Internationale d'Anvers, 1894.

== Honours ==
- Officer in the Order of Leopold.
- Knight Grand Cross in the Order of Saint Gregory the Great.

== Ancestry ==
Ancestors of Hippolyte d'Ursel

8. Wolfgang, 3rd Duke d'Ursel
4. Charles-Joseph, 4th Duke d'Ursel
9. Princess Flore d'Arenberg
2. Count Ludovic-Marie d'Ursel
10. Carlo Sebastiano Fieschi, Prince di Masserano
5. Louise-Victoire Fieschi, Princess di Masserano.
11. Adélaïde de Béthune
Count Hippolyte d'Ursel
12. Louis Gabriel de Gueulluy, Marquis de Rumigny
6. Marie-Hippolyte de Gueulluy, Marquis de Rumigny
13. Marie Hatte
3. Marie-Louise de Gueulluy de Rumigny
14. Édouard Mortier, duc de Trévise
7. Caroline Mortier de Trévise
15. Eve-Anne Hymmès

== See also ==
- Ursel family
- Belgian nobility
