= Louis Barbe Charles Sérurier =

French diplomat

Louis Charles Barbe Serurier (7 April 1775 Marle - 1860 Paris) was a French diplomat, and French consul general (equivalent to an ambassador) from 1811 to 1815, and envoy from 1831 to 1835, to the United States.

== Life ==
He was a cousin of Jean Sérurier. He was sent first as secretary of the embassy in The Hague, then was Ambassador Extraordinary and Plenipotentiary to the United States, Brazil, Belgium, and Holland. He was succeeded by Marie-Hippolyte de Gueulluy, 2nd Marquess of Rumigny

He was a Peer of France, Grand Officer of the Legion of Honor, Chevalier of Ordre de la Réunion and wore the Order of Leopold (Belgium).

He was buried in the 73e Division of the Père-Lachaise Cemetery, with his wife Louise Pageot Noutières (1795–1876), and Countess Maurice Sérurier, born Amelia Elle Pellerin (1839–1897), who was killed in the fire of the Bazar de la Charité.
