= Ferdinand, Duke of Mayenne =

French nobleman (1610-1632)

Ferdinand Gonzaga, Duke of Mayenne (1610–1632) was a French nobleman and Duke of Mayenne from the House of Gonzaga. He was the son of Charles I Gonzaga, Duke of Mantua.

== Biography ==
The coat of arms of the Dukes of Mayenne

Ferdinand Gonzaga was the youngest son of Charles I Gonzaga, Duke of Mantua, Nevers, Rethel and Prince of Arches and Charleville and Catherine of Lorraine-Mayenne, who was the daughter of Duke Charles of Mayenne.

In 1627, his father became, following the War of the Mantuan Succession, Duke of Mantua and Montferrat.

Ferdinand, who was Duke of Nevers by courtesy, was 21 years old when he inherited in 1631, the fiefs of his brother Charles II Gonzaga of Mayenne. He thus became Duke of Mayenne and Aiguillon as well as Marquis of Villars, Count of Maine, Tende and Sommerive. He also became heir to his father's fiefdoms.

This situation lasted less than a year because of Ferdinand's death without issue on 25 May 1632, leaving his lands to his nephew Charles II Gonzaga of Mantua.

The Duchy of Aiguillon was ceded to Cardinal Richileu, who incorporated it into the French Crown.
