= Avicenna Bay =

Bay in Antarctica

Coordinates: 64°26′S 62°23′W

Avicenna Bay is a small bay lying 1.5 miles (2.4 km) southwest of D'Ursel Point along the east side of Brabant Island, in the Palmer Archipelago. It was roughly charted by the Belgian Antarctic Expedition under Adrien de Gerlache, 1897–99, photographed by Hunting Aerosurveys Ltd in 1956–57, and mapped from these photos in 1959. It was named by the UK Antarctic Place-Names Committee for Avicenna, greatest of the Persian school of physicians.

== Maps ==
- Antarctic Digital Database (ADD). Scale 1:250000 topographic map of Antarctica. Scientific Committee on Antarctic Research (SCAR). Since 1993, regularly upgraded and updated.
- British Antarctic Territory. Scale 1:200000 topographic map. DOS 610 Series, Sheet W 64 62. Directorate of Overseas Surveys, Tolworth, UK, 1980.
- Brabant Island to Argentine Islands. Scale 1:250000 topographic map. British Antarctic Survey, 2008.
