= Aymard d'Ursel =

Marie-Henri-Adrien-Aymard count d'Ursel (1849–1939) was a Belgian Noble Courtier of the Vatican.

By mother's side he was a grandson of Marie-Hippolyte de Gueulluy, 2nd Marquess of Rumigny and a descendant of Édouard Mortier, Duke of Trévise. He was the elder brother of Hippolyte d'Ursel. After his marriage to countess Marie du Chastel de la Howarderie he became the resident of Moulbaix Castle. The castle was abandoned by his children and became famous for its ruins.

== Career ==
He served in the Belgian army and was active in the artillery. He became secret Chamberlain (Cameriére di Spade e Cappa di Sua. Santita.) of Leo XIII. During his days in the Vatican he was in service of the papal nuncio.

He was also:

- président de l'Œuvre de Saint-Paul, Bruselles.
- Président of the Fédération des mutualités chrétiennes du Brabant wallon (Ouest)

== Honours ==
- Belgium: Officer in the Order of Leopold.
- Vatican: Commander of the Order of St. Gregory the Great.
- Austrian Empire: Knight of the Order of the Iron Crown.
- Kingdom of Portugal: Knight of the Order of the Immaculate Conception of Vila Viçosa
