= Francis III Gonzaga, Duke of Rethel =

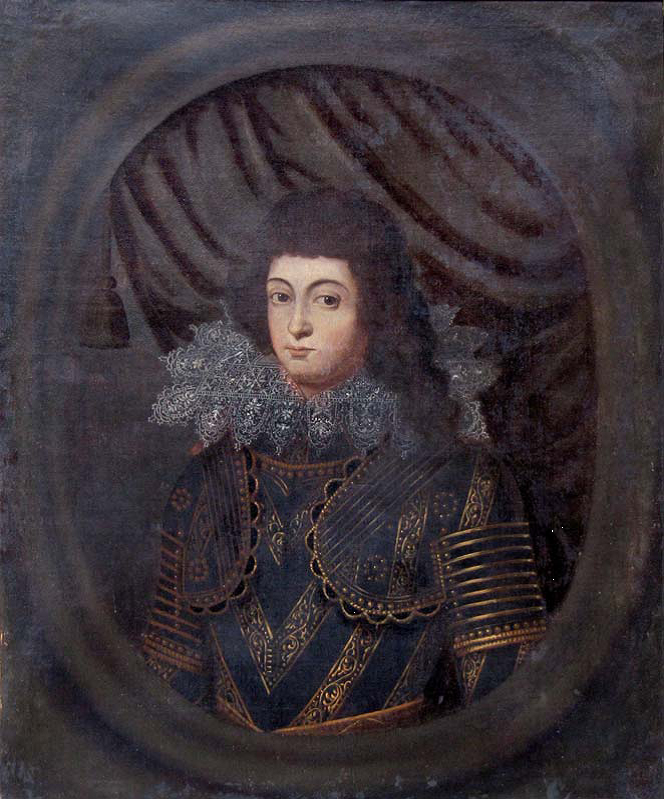
Portrait of Francis Gonzaga, by unknown Mantuan artist

Francis III Gonzaga, Duke of Rethel (1606–1622) was a French nobleman of the House of Gonzaga of Franco-Italian stock, and Duke of Rethel. He was the son of Charles I Gonzaga, Duke of Mantua.

== Biography ==
Francis Paul Gonzaga was the eldest son of Charles I Gonzaga, Duke of Mantua and Montferrat. His mother was Catherine of Mayenne, daughter of the famous military commander Charles, Duke of Mayenne.

Francis was Duke of Rethel by Courtesy, and was heir to his father's fiefdoms, the duchies of Nevers and Rethel and the principality of Arches and Charleville He also served as governor of Champagne and Brie.

He died unmarried in Charleville, and without descendants at the young age of 16, on 13 October 1622, leaving his younger brother Charles as heir presumptive.
