= Hex Castle =

Château in Limburg, Belgium

Coordinates: 50°46′09″N 5°21′38″E

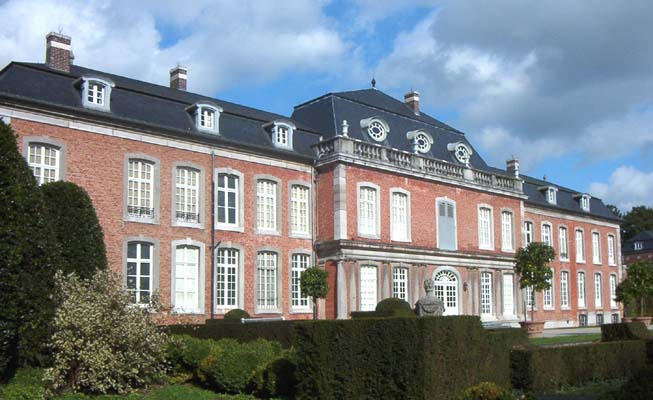
Main facade of Hex Castle

Heks Castle (Dutch: Kasteel van Heks) is a château in the village of Heks in the municipality of Heers, province of Limburg, Belgium.

== History ==
The house was built in the 1770s by the Liège architect Etienne Fayen for the Prince-Bishop of Liège, Franz Karl, Count of Velbrück (1719–1784). As a humanist and nature-lover, the prince-bishop chose this spot in the scenic Haspengouw region on which to build his country house and to lay out a number of gardens, including a Chinese garden, a kitchen garden and a rose garden. Later he added one of the first landscaped parks on the European mainland, inspired by the English landscaping of Capability Brown. The bishop died here in 1784.

== Today ==
The estate is now in the private possession of Count Ghislain d' Ursel, since the third generation. They keep the estate in shape and restore the valuable gardens and heritage.

The rose garden contains an exceptional assortment of about 250 varieties, of which the oldest were present in the original garden. Since 1970 Countess Michel d'Ursel restored and increased the original formal Renaissance garden laid out by Prince Bishop Velbruck in 1770. In 2003 the Garden of Roses was granted the Award of Garden Excellence by the World Federation of Rose Societies.

The gardens and the park are open to the public on selected weekends during the summer months.

== See also ==
- Ursel family
- List of castles in Belgium
