= D'Ursel Castle =

Castle in Hingene, Bornem, Belgium

Coordinates: 51.104°N 4.271°E

d'Ursel Castle Ducal Castle of Hingene
- Belgium
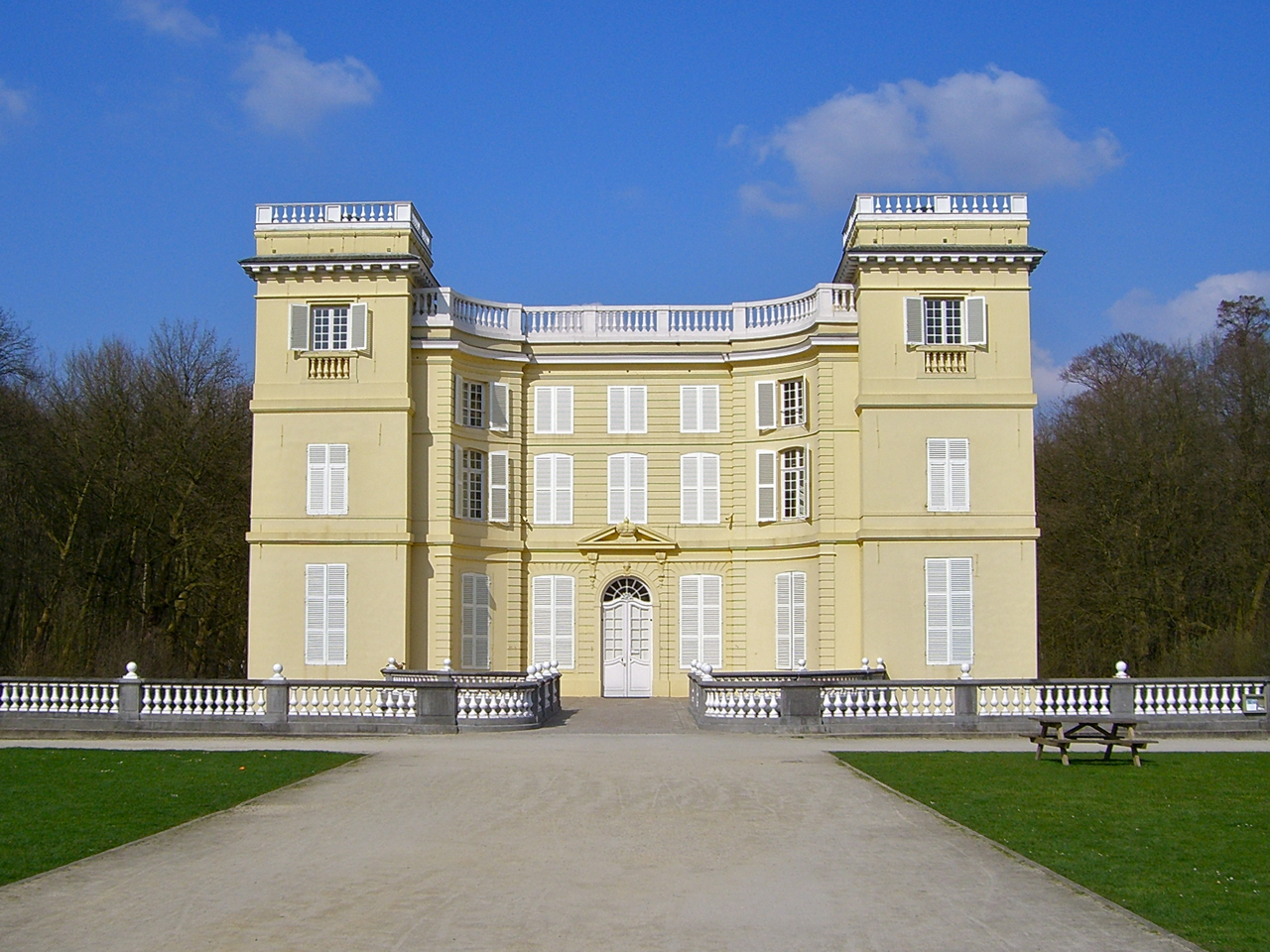

Site information
- Type: Castle
- Open to the public: yes

Site history
- Built: 1761
- Built by: Giovanni Niccolò Servandoni for the Duke of Ursel
- In use: Province of Antwerp

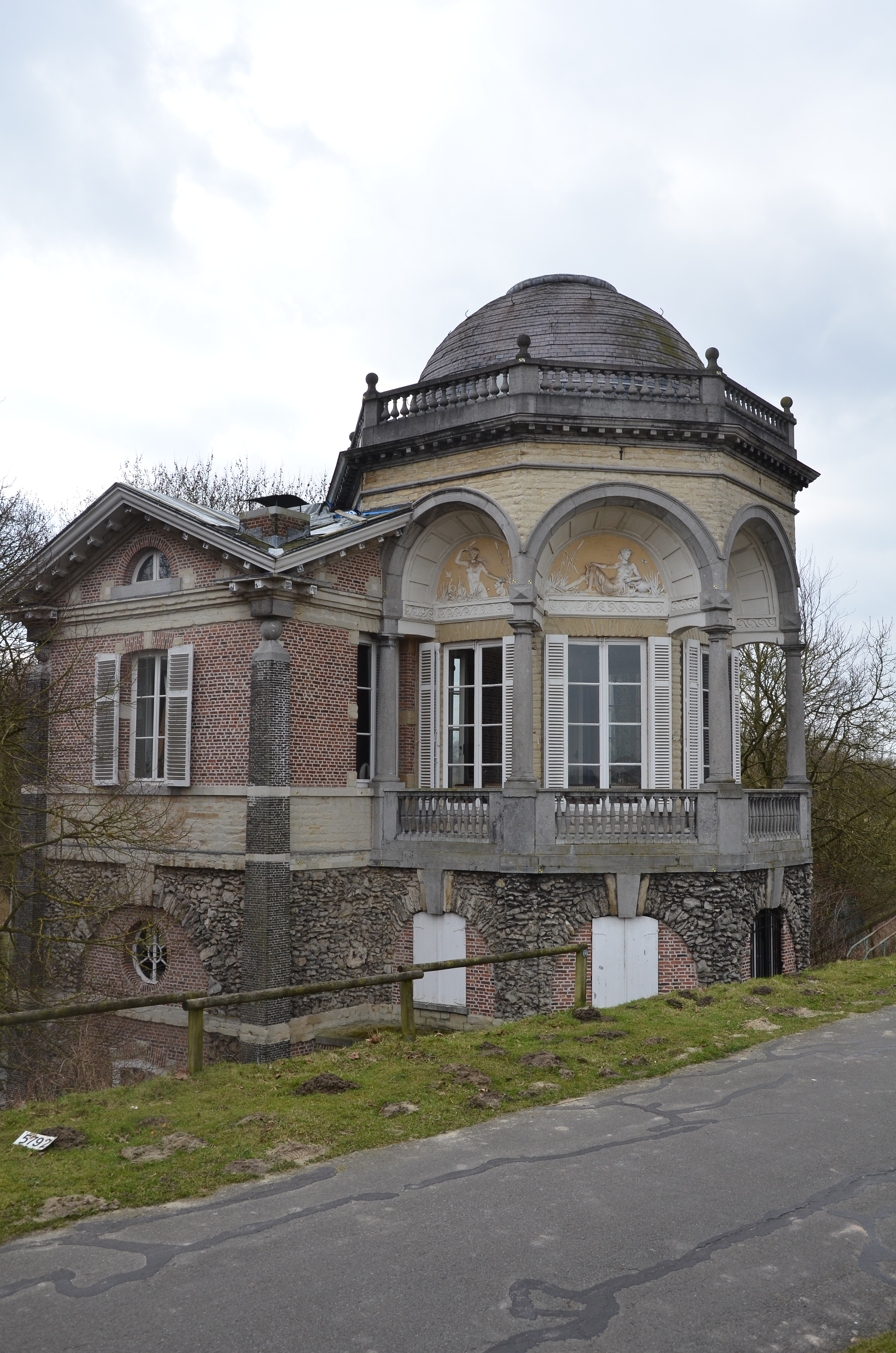
De Notelaer, 18th century pavilion in the park.

D'Ursel Castle (Dutch: Kasteel van Hingene, also known as the Kasteel d'Ursel) used to be the private summer residence of the Duke of Ursel in Hingene in the municipality of Bornem, province of Antwerp, Belgium. Today it is property of the State, and opened to the public.

== History ==
The first resident was Diederik van de Werve (1519-1598), his descendants sold it to Conrad III Schetz in 1608. The estate became the summer residence of the House of Ursel. The Dukes of Ursel and their family resided for 350 years on the estate. Its original view can be seen in the Flandria Illustrata. A famous resident was Conrard-Albert, first Duke of Ursel (1665-1738). His son, Charles, 2nd Duke d'Ursel asked Giovanni Niccolò Servandoni (1695-1766) to redesign the family estate. The front was made symmetric like a palace.

The duke received important noblemen here, such as Johan von Sinzendorf und Pottendorf (1739-1813) and Joseph de Ferraris. During the 18th century the castle was known for banquets and balls. Marriages in the family were celebrated by the whole village, the dukes usually being well regarded locally. On 10 August 1876 the Queen and the Duke and Duchess of Saxony visited the castle and the town of Hignene. In 1894 Prince Albert and his brother in law, the Prince of Hohenzollern visited the castle.

Around 1960 the castle was sold by Henri, 8th Duke d'Ursel, the furniture, family archives and contents of the library were removed from the castle. The House of Ursel left the town, and chose to reside henceforth in Brussels.

In 1994 the province of Antwerp obtained ownership and restored the estate to its 17th century state. The current Duke of Ursel gave an important part of private ducal Collection in private loan (Commodate), to be put on exhibition in the rooms of the estate.

== See also ==
- List of castles in Belgium
