= Philippe d'Ursel =

Swiss-born Belgian alpine skier (1920–2017)

Philippe Marie Eugène, Count d'Ursel
Personal information
- Nationality: Belgian
- Born: 28 June 1920; Bern, Switzerland
- Died: 26 March 2017 (aged 96)

Sport
- Sport: Alpine skiing

Philippe Marie Eugène, Count d'Ursel (28 June 1920 – 26 March 2017) was a Swiss-born Belgian alpine skier and a member of the Ursel family.

He was born in Bern, Switzerland in June 1920 and was a grandson of count Charles d'Ursel. Count d'Ursel competed at the 1948 Winter Olympics in St. Moritz and finished 70th in a field of 111 competitors in the men's downhill event and 39th in a field of 78 competitors in the men's combined event. Count d'Ursel died in March 2017 in Oostkamp, Belgium at the age of 96.
