= Hingene =

- Village
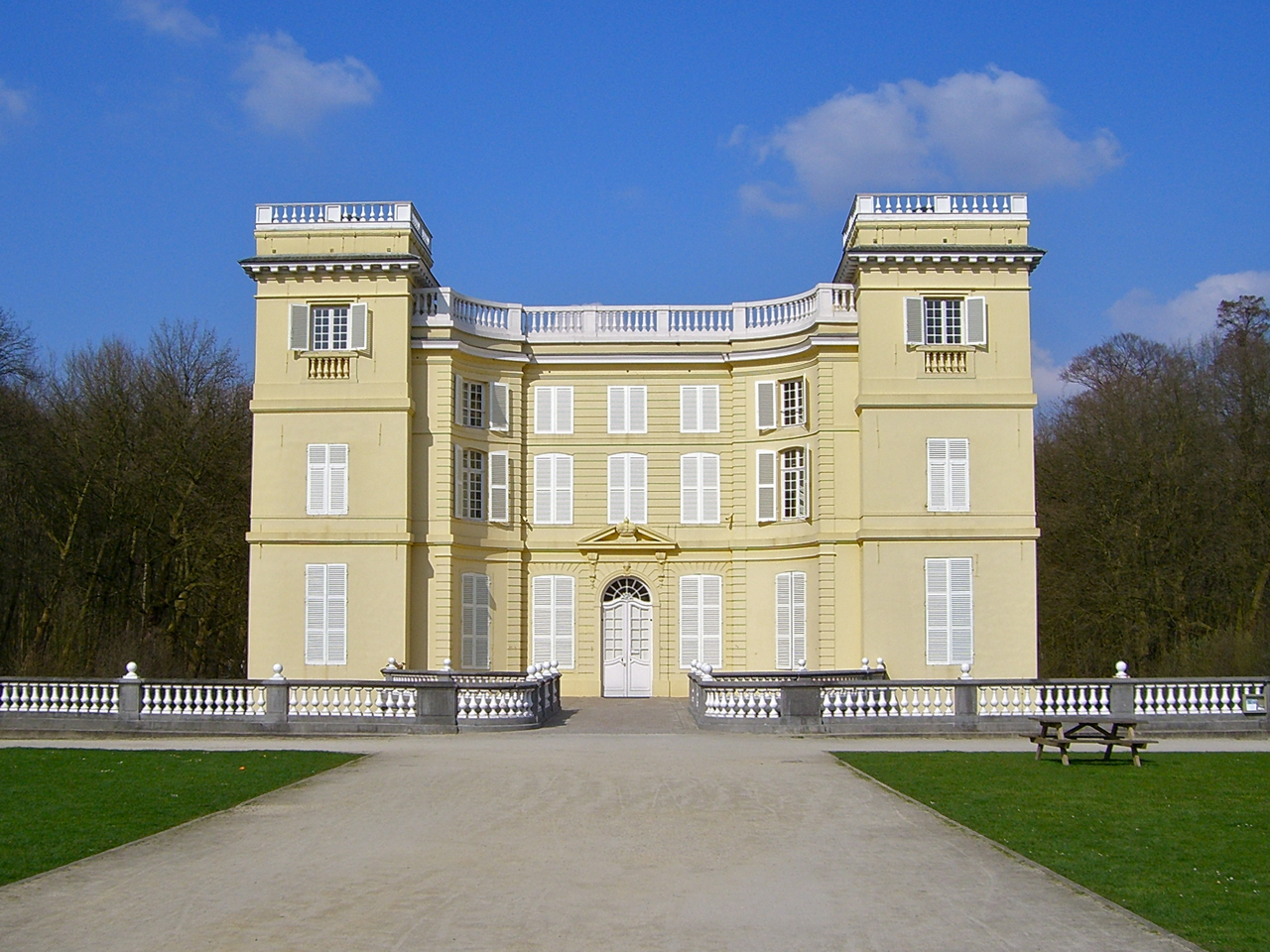
- D'Ursel Castle

- Location in Belgium
- Coordinates: 51.1033°N 4.2689°E
- Country: Belgium
- Region: Flemish Region
- Province: Antwerp
- Municipality: Bornem

Area
  - Total: 15.06 km^{2} (5.81 sq mi)

Population (2021)
  - Total: 5,028
  - Density: 333.9/km^{2} (864.7/sq mi)
- Time zone: CET

Hingene is a village and deelgemeente (sub-municipality) of the municipality of Bornem in the province of Antwerp, Belgium. The village is bordered to the north by the Scheldt and to the east by the Rupel. It is located about 16 kilometres (9.9 mi) south-west of the city of Antwerp.

== History ==
In 1846, a hoard of coins was discovered in Hingene from the Roman era. Due to its proximity to the Scheldt and Rupel, the area mainly consists of polder land. Early dike building started in the 11th century, and during the 15th century the rivers were constrained by dikes.

The early history of the area is characterised by rivalry with Bornem. In 1535, Hingene became property of Henry III of Nassau-Breda. His nephew William the Silent became Stadtholder of Holland, Zeeland and Utrecht, and was forced to sell Hingene in 1560 as an independent heerlijkheid to the Lord of Grobbendonk whose family later became known as the Dukes of Ursel. The Ursel family lived in the D'Ursel Castle whose domain dominates the village.

The village of Nattenhaasdonk used to be part of the municipality of Hingene. Nattenhaasdonk was an independent parish and more important than Hingene until the 16th century. The February flood of 1825 destroyed Nattenhaasdonk which remained under water for weeks and was abandoned.

Hingene used to be an independent municipality until 1977, when it was merged into Bornem. In 1980s, the river dikes were heightened after the devastating flood of Ruisbroek in 1976.

== Notable people ==
- Jules Mees (1876–1937), professor of historical geography
- Martin Van Den Bossche (born 1941), retired professional road bicycle racer

== Gallery ==
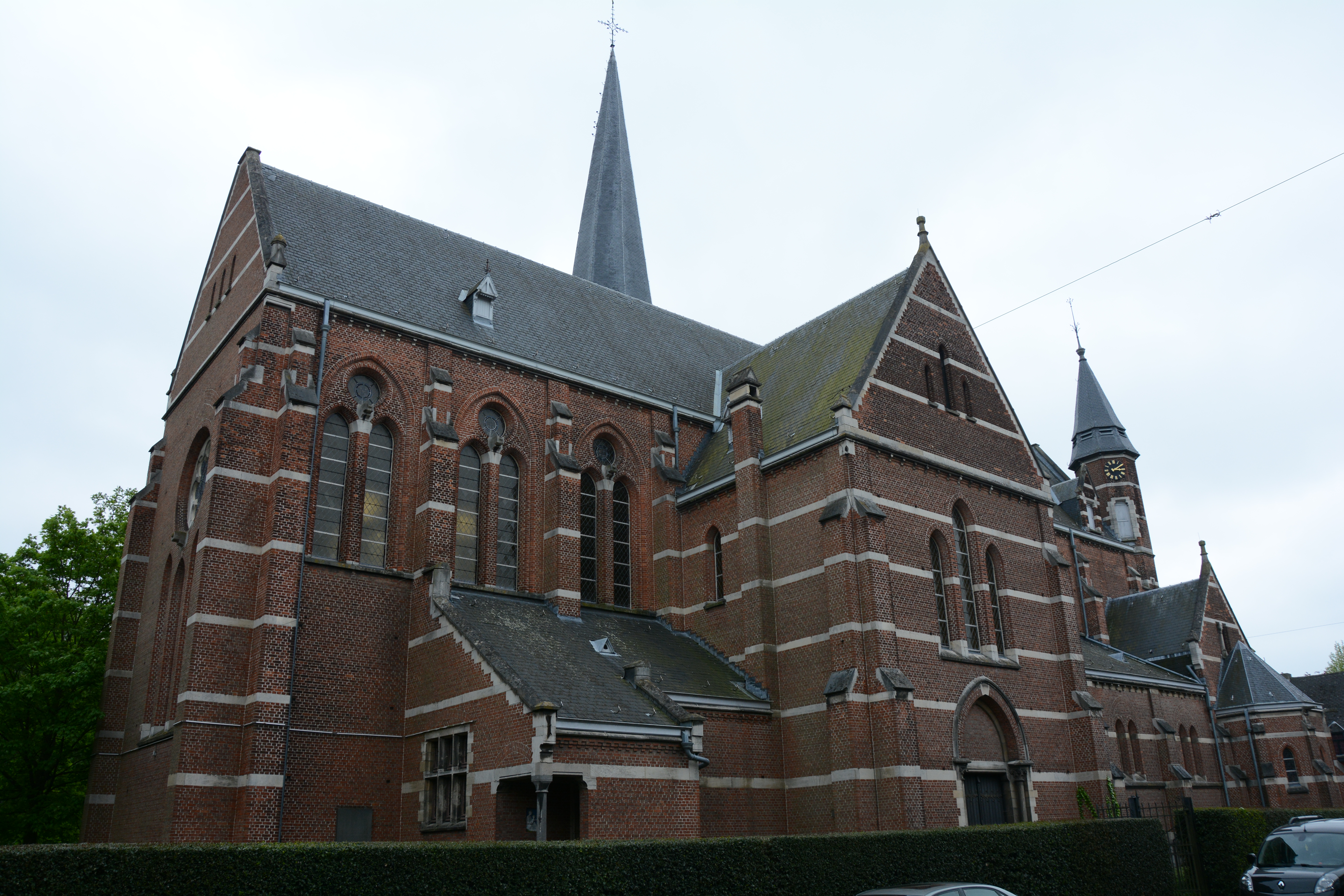
St Stefanus Church

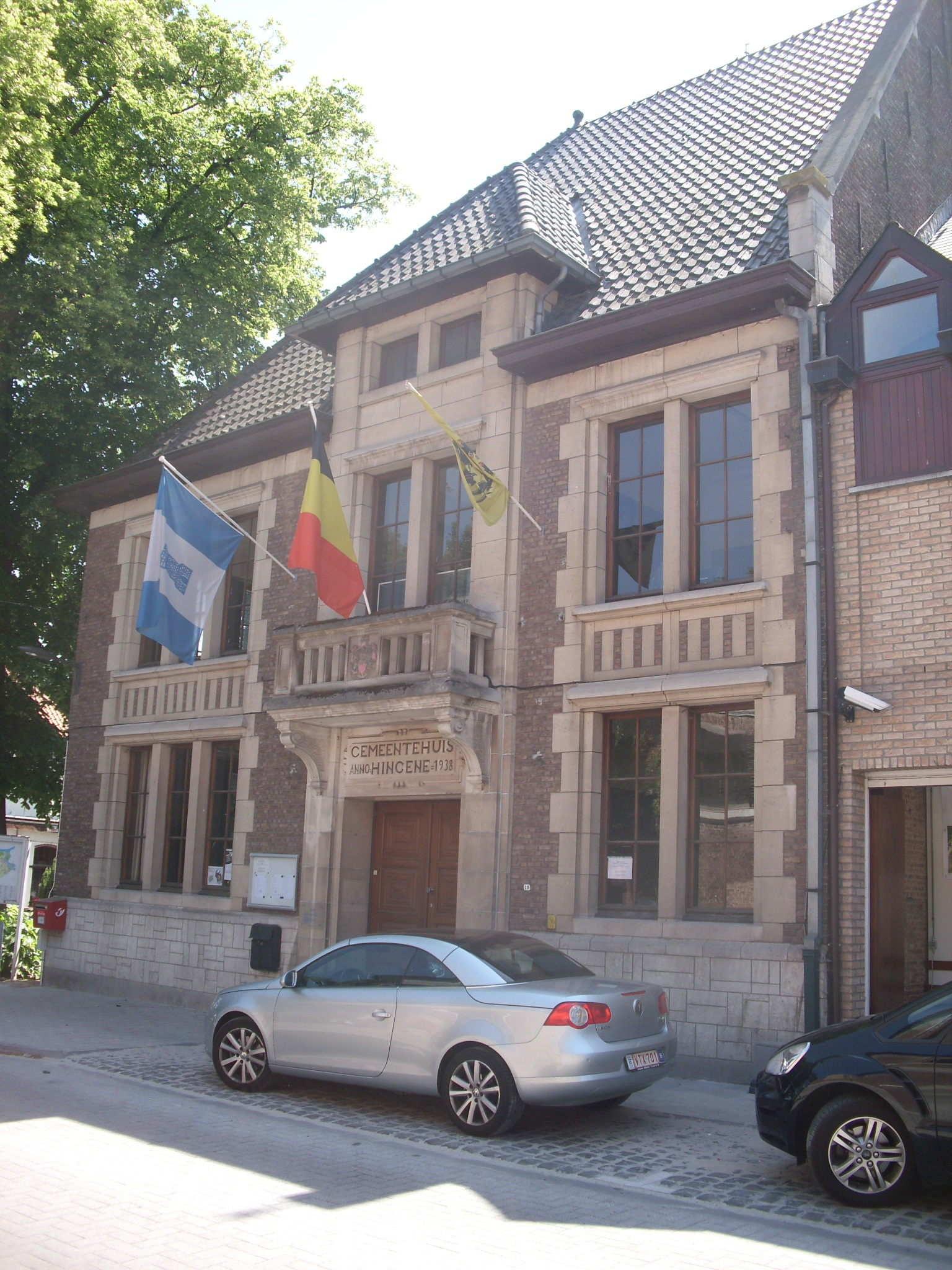
Former town hall

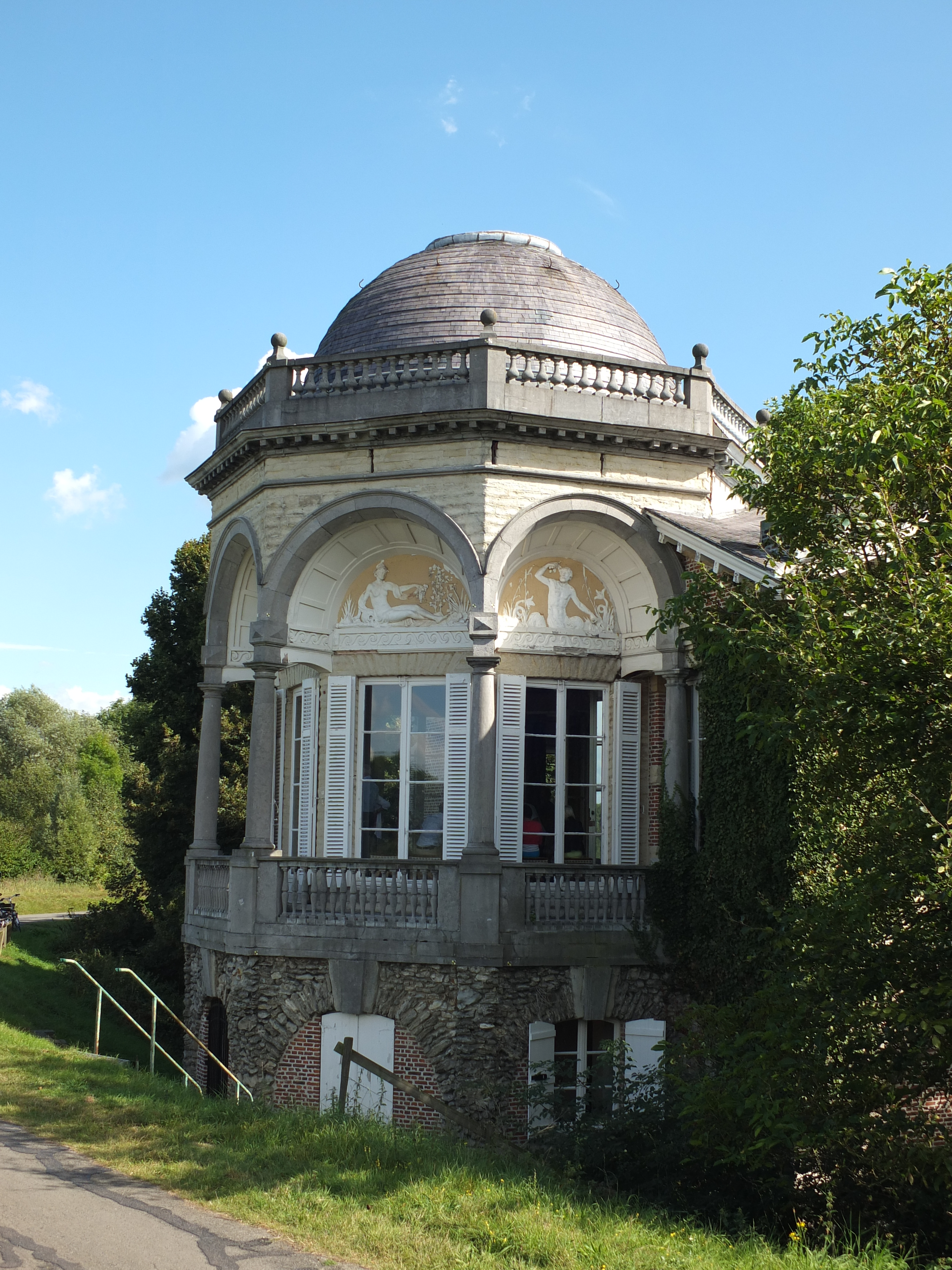
Pavilion De Notelaer

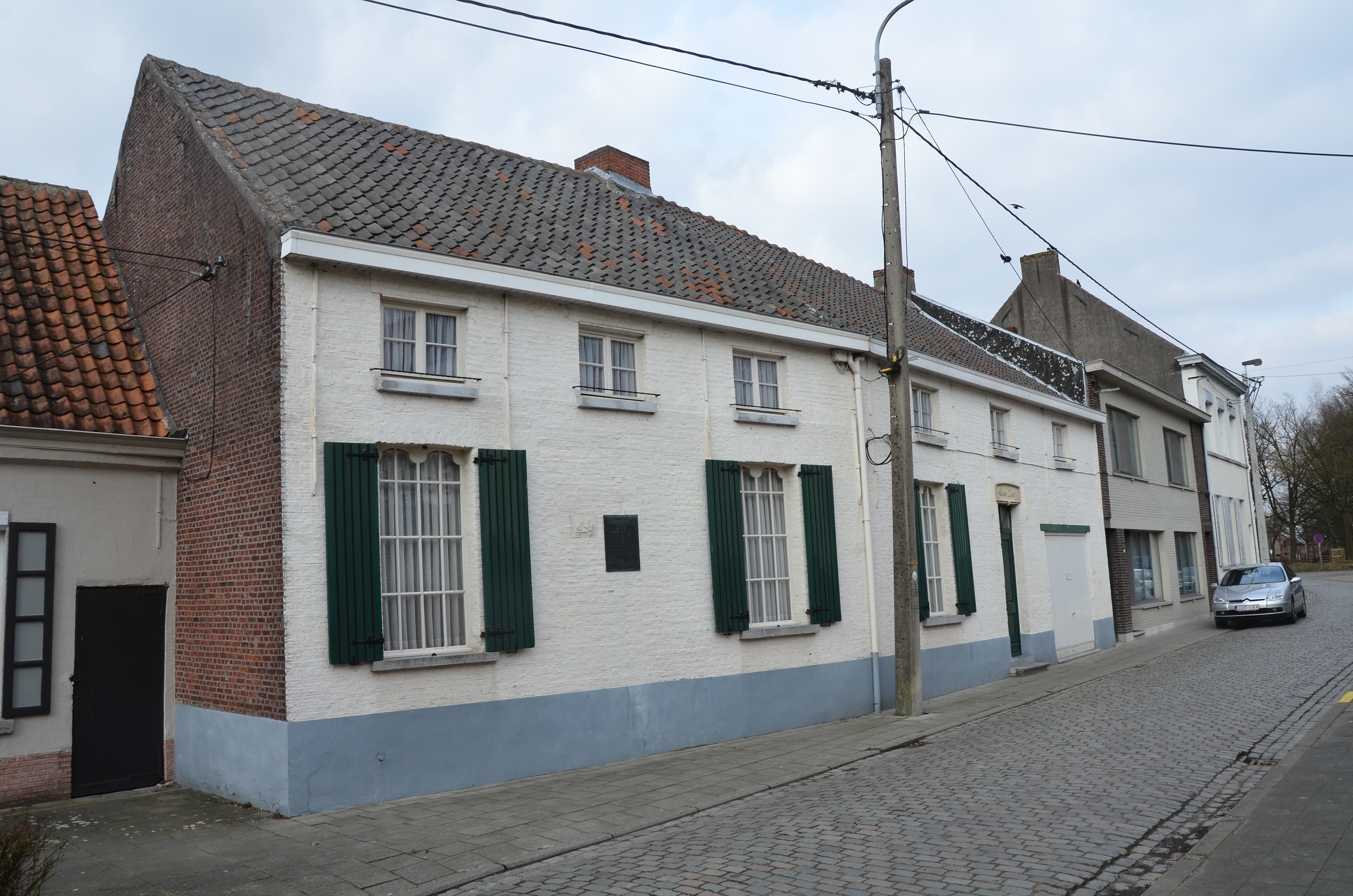
Street view
