= Henri, 8th Duke d'Ursel =

Belgian film director and writer

Henri-Charles, 8th Duke d'Ursel
- Reign: 1955–1974
- Predecessor: Robert, 7th Duke d'Ursel
- Successor: Antonin, 9th Duke d'Ursel.
- Born: Brussels
- Buried: Hingene, Bornem
- Family: House of Ursel
- Spouse: Antoinette de la Temoille
- Occupation: Filmmaker (1929–1974), Vice-President of the Belgian Royal Film Archive

Henri Charles Francis Joseph Marie, 8th Duke d'Ursel (Henri, 8th Duke d'Ursel) (18 November 1900 – 31 May 1974, in Uccle) was a Belgian film director and writer. Henri d'Ursel was known for his surrealist style, directing the film La Perle early in his career.

== Family ==
Henri d'Ursel was born in Brussels, son of the 7th duke of Ursel. During the 1920s, he lived in Paris at the height of the surrealist and avant-garde movements. He married princess Antoinette, the daughter of Louis Charles Marie de La Trémoille, the 10th Duke of Thouars. He became the brother-in-law of Charlotte de La Trémoille and Louis Jean Marie de La Trémoille. They both separated and the marriage was annulled in Rome on 5 June 1936.

After he inherited D'Ursel Castle he decided in 1970 to sell the large family estate, since generations in the family. In 1973 the local government of Hingene acquired the ducal estate for €372,000. He left the castle completely empty after he took all the valuable furniture out and deposed the complete family archive in the National Archives of Brussels.

He was succeeded by his son Antonin, 9th Duke d'Ursel. The current Duke of Ursel, Stéphane, is his grandson.

== Film career ==
La Perle (1929)

In 1929 he wrote La Perle, under the pseudonym "Henri d'Arches" (the duke of Ursel is Prince of Arches and Charleville), based on a story by Georges Hugnet. Of the filmmaking experience, D'Ursel later said it was made "in the flush of inexperience."

Returning to Belgium, in 1937 d'Ursel and Louis Camu founded Le Prix de l’Image, a precursor to film festivals of experimental cinema. At the outbreak of World War II, he and Luc Haesaerts founded Le Séminaire des Arts, a prestigious Belgian film club, and precursor of the Musée du cinéma de Bruxelles.

D'Ursel was a friend of both Charles Dekeukeleire and Henri Storck. He was for 25 years vice-president of the Belgian Royal Film Archive, until his death in 1974.

== Honours ==
- Knight of the Order of Leopold.
- Knight of the Legion of Honour.
- Officer of the Royal Victorian Order.

== See also ==
- Duke of Ursel
- Cinema of Belgium
- Surrealist cinema
