= Robert, 7th Duke d'Ursel =

Belgian politician (1873–1955)

Robert Léon Marie d'Ursel
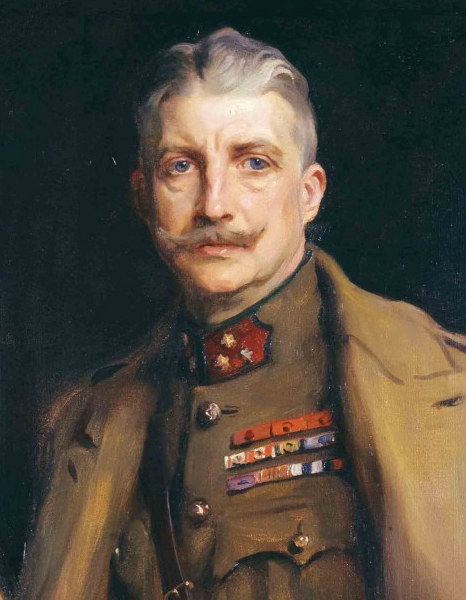
- The 7th Duke d'Ursel portrait by Philip de László

Duke of Ursel
- In office 1903–1955
- Preceded by: Marie Joseph Charles, 6th Duke d'Ursel
- Succeeded by: Henri, 8th Duke d'Ursel

Personal details
- Party: Catholic Party

Robert-Marie-Léon, 7th Duke d'Ursel (1873–1955) was a Belgian politician.

== Family ==
He was the son of Marie Joseph Charles, 6th Duke d'Ursel. He married in 1898 to Sabine Franquet de Franqueville. After his death he was succeeded by his son Henri, 8th Duke d'Ursel.

== Career ==
He was selected to be commissioner of the Brussels International Exposition of 1910. During the 1st WW he served as volunteer, and fought in the Battle of the Yser in the 2nd Guides Regiment. He was however sent away from the battlefield and became officer in the connection services. The duke was part of the royal cortège during the Joyous Entry of the sovereign in Brussels. After the war he participated in the Senate in the debates of the reconstruction of the devastated country. The duke was rewarded multiple international honours for his merit.

He had his portrait pâinted by de Laszlo after the War in 1920 in Kensington, they did meet before in an art gallery. Robert d'Ursel was very impressed by the talent of the artist, and de Laszlo gifted the duke a painted sketch of him as sign of respect and friendship. In 1926 he requested to paint a portrait of the dowager duchess d'Ursel, his mother. The portrait was put on display in the Charpentier Gallery in Paris. Both families had close contact, which resulted in 3 generations of portrait paintings of the House of Ursel.

Later he became Lord mayor of Higene, member of the Senate and Special mission of the King, he was sent to the Russian and Danish court. He was active in social circles and was president of the Royal Automobile Club of Belgium. He was President of the Centre for Fine Arts in Brussels.

== Honours ==
- Belgium
  - War Cross.
  - Grand Cross in the Order of the Crown.
  - Grand Officer in the Order of Leopold.
- Grand Cross in the Order of the Lion and the Sun.
- Grand Cordon in the Order of Saint Anna.
- Benin: Grand Cross in the Order of the Black Star.
- Grand Cross in the Royal Victorian Order
- Denmark: Grand Cross in the Order of the Dannebrog
- Monaco: Grand Cross in the Order of Saint-Charles
