= Charles d'Ursel =

Charles-Marie-Leon, Count d'Ursel (1848–1903) was a Belgian politician of the Catholic Party.

== Family ==
He was a grandson of Charles-Joseph, 4th Duke d'Ursel, a brother of Hippolyte d'Ursel and Aymard d'Ursel. He married Genevieve le Roux and had descendants, among them his grandchildren count Philippe d'Ursel.

== Career ==
He was officer of the Papal Zouaves from 1867 to 1870, when he entered the Belgian foreign service. He served as Governor of the Province of Hainaut 1889–94, and of West Flanders 1901–3. He was a member of the Catholic Party.

== Honours ==
- Belgium:
  - Officer of the Order of Leopold.
  - Knight of the Order of the African Star.
- Kingdom of Romania:
  - Knight Grand-Cross of the Order of the Star of Romania.
  - Commander of the Order of the Crown.
- France: Grand officer of the Legion of Honour.
- Kingdom of Spain: Commander of the Order of Isabella the Catholic.
- Kingdom of Prussia:
  - Commander of the Order of the Crown of Prussia.
  - Officer of the Order of the Red Eagle.
- Officer of the Order of the Rose.
- Vatican:
  - Knight of the Order of Pope Pius IX.
  - Medal of Mentana.
  - Benemerenti medal
