= D'Ursel Point =

D'Ursel Point (64°25′S 62°20′W) is a headland which marks the south side of the entrance to Buls Bay on the southeast coast of Brabant Island, in the Palmer Archipelago.

Avicenna Bay sits approximately 1.5 miles (2.4 km) to the southwest.

== History ==
It was discovered by the Belgian Antarctic Expedition, 1897–99, under Gerlache, and named by him for count Hippolyte d'Ursel (Brussel, 17 November 1850 - 9 December 1937), Président of the Royal Belgian Society of Géographics and a supporter of the expedition. The cape was recharted by Falkland Islands Dependencies Survey from Norsel in April 1955 and photographed from the air by FIDASE, 1956–57.

== Maps ==
- Antarctic Digital Database (ADD). Scale 1:250000 topographic map of Antarctica. Scientific Committee on Antarctic Research (SCAR). Since 1993, regularly upgraded and updated.
- British Antarctic Territory. Scale 1:200000 topographic map. DOS 610 Series, Sheet W 64 62. Directorate of Overseas Surveys, Tolworth, UK, 1980.
- Brabant Island to Argentine Islands. Scale 1:250000 topographic map. British Antarctic Survey, 2008.
