= Catherine of Lorraine (1585–1618) =

Catherine de Lorraine
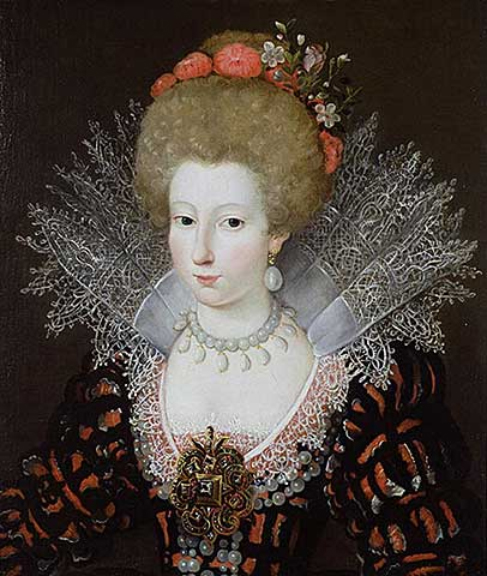
- Other names: Catherine de Mayenne-Lorraine-Guise
- Born: 1585
- Died: 8 March 1618 (aged 32–33); Hôtel de Nevers, Paris, France
- Noble family: House of Lorraine
- Spouse: Charles Gonzaga (m. 1599)
- Issue: see below
- Father: Charles, Duke of Mayenne
- Mother: Henriette of Savoy-Villars
- Occupation: Aristocrat

Catherine de Lorraine (1585 – 8 March 1618), or Catherine de Mayenne-Lorraine-Guise, was a French aristocrat.

== Life ==
Catherine de Lorraine was born in 1585, as the daughter of Charles, Duke of Mayenne, and Henriette of Savoy-Villars.

On 1 February 1599, at the age of 14, She married Charles de Gonzague, future Duke of Mantua and Montferrat, in Soissons, and actively assisted her husband in his administration. In 1604 she was courted insistently by Henry IV of France. She and her husband chose to leave the French court. She gave her husband six children, three boys and three girls.

Catherine created many convents, monasteries, abbeys, churches, schools and hospitals. In Charleville she founded a college of the Society of Jesus, where youth were educated in piety and letters. She also founded a Capuchin convent and a hospital in that city. She founded two Carmelite monasteries, a monastery of the Holy Sepulcher, a Franciscan convent, a Capuchin church, and a large priory of the Christian Militia that served as a hospital.

In 1615 Catherine was chosen from among the princesses of France to accompany Elizabeth of France, sister of King Louis XIII, to the borders of France and Spain, and there to receive Infanta Anna of Spain. After catching a chill, she died at her Hôtel de Nevers in Paris in 1618 at the age of 33. Her biography by Père Hilarion de Coste says that "One would not know enough to praise the wise, chaste and virtuous Caterine, except to confess that she surpasses all praise."

== Children ==
Catherine and Charles had:

- François (1606–22) was given the courtesy title of Duke Francis III of Rethel. He died on October 13, 1622, at the age of 16.
- Charles (1609–31) became Duke Charles III of Mayenne in 1621 on the death of his uncle Henry of Lorraine, Duke of Mayenne, brother of his mother. In 1622 he assumed the courtesy title of Duke Charles IV of Rethel. He died in 1631 at the age of 22.
- Ferdinand (1610–32) assumed the title of Duke Ferdinand of Mayenne in 1631 on the death of Charles. He died in 1632 at the age of 22.
- Marie Louise (1611–67) married King Władysław IV Vasa of Poland, and after his death married his half-brother King John II Casimir Vasa. She died in 1667 at the age of 56.
- Bénédicte (1614–37), pronounced her vows in 1633. She became abbess of Avenay near Épernay. She died on 20 December 1637 at the age of 23.
- Anne-Marie (1616–84) in 1639 reportedly secretly married Henry II of Guise. He abandoned her and in 1645 Anne was married to Edward of the Palatinate, grandson of King James I, with whom she had three daughters. She died in 1684 aged 68.

== Sources ==
- Société d'Histoire des Ardennes (March 2016), "Les Princesses de Gonzague", CAROLO Mag (198), archived from the original on 2019-04-07
- Parrott, David (1997). "A "prince souvereign" and the French crown: Charles de Nevers, 1580-1637". In Oresko, Robert; Gibbs, G. C.; Scott, H M (eds.). Royal and Republican Sovereignty in Early Modern Europe: Essays in Memory of Ragnhild Marie Hatton. Cambridge University Press. pp. 149–187.
