= Charles Joseph Marie, 6th Duke d'Ursel =

Belgian politician (1848–1903)

Charles Joseph Marie d'Ursel
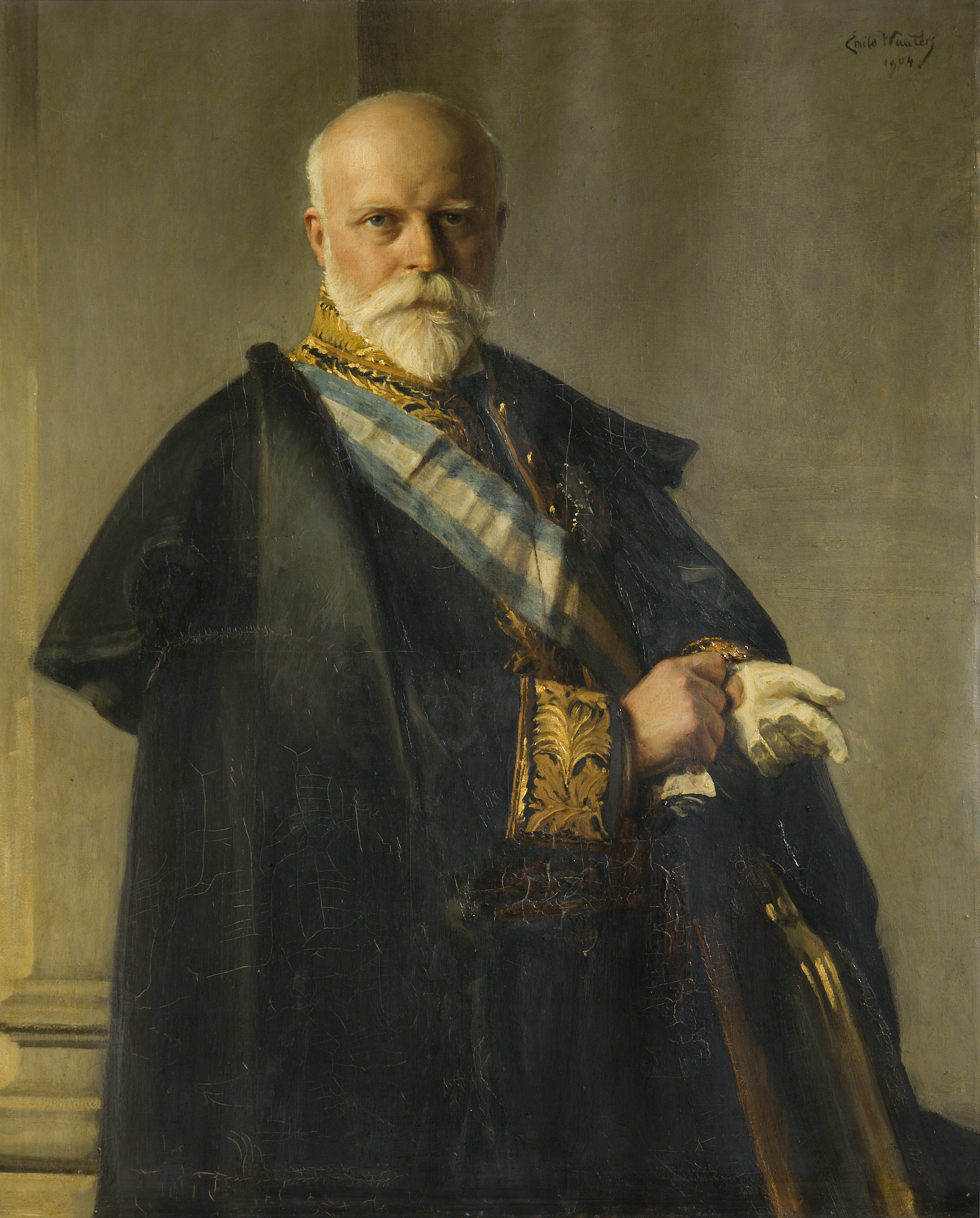
- Portrait wearing the sash of the Order of Charles III by Emile Wauters, collection of the Belgian Senate, Brussels.

President of the Senate
- In office 1899–1903
- Monarch: Leopold II
- Succeeded by: Henri, Count de Merode

Duke of Ursel
- In office 1878–1903
- Succeeded by: Robert, 7th Duke d'Ursel

Personal details
- Party: Catholic Party

Charles Joseph Marie, 6th Duke d'Ursel (Brussels, July 3, 1848 – Strombeek-Bever, November 15, 1903), was a Belgian politician.

== Family ==
Joseph, Count d'Ursel was the second son of Léon, 5th Duke d'Ursel (1805–1878) and his second wife, Henriette d'Harcourt. Joseph's elder brother died before inheriting the title, and Joseph became the 6th Duke of Ursel on the death of his father.

=== Antonine de Mun, Duchess d'Ursel ===
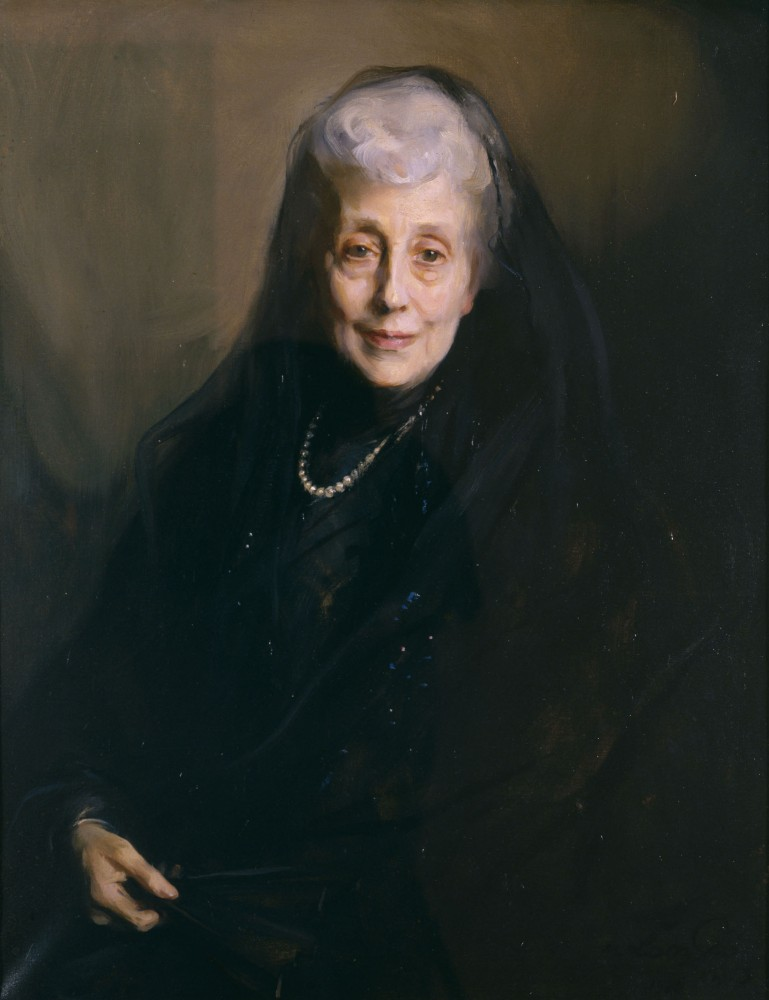
Antonine, dowager Duchess d'Ursel, painted by Philip Alexius de Laszlo

In 1872, Joseph married his niece, Antonine de Mun (1849–1931), daughter of the Marquess de Mun. She was a sister of Count Albert de Mun and born in Paris. In Belgium, she became a respected artist in aristocratic circles.

She studied in the atelier of Charles Joshua Chaplin and painted many portraits of family members and members of the Belgian royal family. A year before her death, she was honoured in her own right by the Belgian King: she was rewarded and became a Dame in the Order of Leopold. Recently, she was honoured with the production of an exclusive beer, the Cuvee Antonine, and the artworks on the bottle are of the duchess.

=== Children ===
- Robert, 7th Duke d'Ursel (1873–1955)
- Henriette d´Ursel (1875–1934), married Count Henri de Boissieu
- Pauline d´Ursel (1880–1915)
- Wolfgang d´Ursel (1882–1914), Lieutenant of the Guides, died in battle, Budingen (18 August 1914).

== Career ==
He was a provincial councilor, then governor of the province of Hainaut (1878) and mayor of Hingene (1878–1903). He was Governor of Hainaut during the strikes of 1886. Impressed by these events, he became, like his brother-in-law Albert de Mun, more aware of social issues. He wrote a pamphlet in 1895, basing his ideas on Frederic Le Play.

When he reached the required age, he entered the Belgian Senate. He was the president of the Senate when he died prematurely.

== Styles and honours ==
=== Styles ===
- 1848 - 1878: Joseph, Count d´Ursel.
- 1878 - 1903: His Grace the 6th Duke of Ursel and Hoboken, Prince of Arches and Charleville, Count of the Holy Roman Empire and of Grobbendonk.

=== Honours ===
- Belgium: Grand Officer in the Order of Leopold.
- Vatican: Knight Grand Cross in the Order of Pope Pius IX.
- Spain: Knight Grand Cross in the Order of Charles III.
- France: Commander in the Legion of Honour.
- Netherlands: Knight in the Order of the Netherlands Lion.

== See also ==
- Ursel family
