= Prince of Arches and Charleville =

Prince of Arches and Charleville is a noble title associated with Charleville-Mézières in France and now held by the Duke of Ursel in Belgium. The title originates with Charles Gonzaga (Gonzagues), Duke of Mantua, who was also Duke of Rethel, a title which included the lordship of Arches, named after a small hamlet. In 1608 Charles elevated this lordship to the sovereign Principality of Arches with himself as first Prince and his new town of Charleville (now Charleville-Mézières) as its capital. The third prince, Charles Ferdinand, died in 1708 without issue; the territory was annexed by the Kingdom of France, while the title Prince of Arches and Charleville continued in the French nobility. The title was inherited by the Duke of Ursel of the Belgian nobility, although the Kingdom of Belgium does not recognise it. Henri, 8th Duke d'Ursel used Henri d'Arches as a pseudonym when making films.

== List of princes of Arches and Charleville ==
1. 1st Prince 1608-1637 : Charles I (1580-1637) né Charles Ier Gonzague, 1er prince d'Arches
2. 2nd Prince 1637-1665 : Charles II (1629-1665) né Charles III Gonzague, 2e prince d'Arches,
3. 3rd Prince 1665-1708 : Charles III Ferdinand (1652-1708), 3e prince d'Arches,
4. 4th Prince: 1708-1723 : given to princesse Anne Henriette of Bavaria, Princess de Conde after the death of her cousin.

After the death of her aunt in 1723 Eleonore Christina zu Salm inherited the principaute.

1. 5th Prince: 1723-1738: Eleonore Christina zu Salm, daughter of Charles Theodore, Prince of Salm and Luise Marie of the Palatinate became 1st duchess d'Ursel.
2. 6th prince: 1738-1775: Charles, 2nd Duke d'Ursel; son of Conrard-Albert d'Ursel and Eleonore Christina zu Salm.
3. 7th Prince: 1775-1804: Wolfgang, 3rd Duke d'Ursel.
4. 8th Prince: 1804-1860: Charles-Joseph, 4th Duke d'Ursel
5. 9th Prince: 1860-1878: John, 5th Duke d'Ursel
6. 10th Prince: 1878-1903: Marie Joseph Charles, 6th Duke d'Ursel
7. 11th Prince: 1903-1955: Robert, 7th Duke d'Ursel
8. 12th Prince: 1955-1974: Henri, 8th Duke d'Ursel
9. 13th Prince: 1974-1989: Antonin, 9th Duke d'Ursel
10. 14th Prince: 1989- current: Stéphane, 10th Duke d'Ursel.
