= Marie Hippolyte de Gueulluy, 2nd Marquis of Rumigny =

Marie Hippolyte de Gueulluy, 2nd Marquis of Rumigny (1784-1871) was a French Peer and diplomat.

== Family ==
He was the son of Louis-Gabriel de Gueulluy, 1st Marquis of Rumigny (1761-1835), created Marquis by Louis XVIII, and Marie-Julie Hatte. His brother was Marie-Théodore Gueilly, vicomte de Rumigny a famous French general, and Aide-de-camp of king Louis Philippe I and his sister was married to viscount Pierre Charles Dejean.

He married Caroline Mortier de Trévise, daughter of Edouard Mortier, Duke of Treviso and had three daughters:

1. Marie Louise Eve de Gueulluy: married Ludovic, son of Charles Joseph, 4th Duke d'Ursel.
2. Marie Antoinette Julie Eugenie de Gueulluy, married to Count Eduard, Count of Sercey an ambassador.
3. Marie Julie Sophie de Gueulluy, married Aymard Charles Hébert, Count of Beauvoir.

== Career ==
In 1805 he entered the French service of foreign diplomacy and became a close confidant of the King. In 1839 he was ambassador in Madrid, and was remarked to be an excellent diplomate. He was Ambassador of the French king in Brussels and succeeded Louis Sérurier. Leopold I, King of the Belgians was son-in law of the French king. He did retire after the French revolution of 1848 in Brussels, where he died at high age.

== Honours ==
- Grand Cordon of the Order of Leopold in 1857.
- Grand officer of the Legion of Honour
- Commander of the Order of the Polar Star.
