= Léo d'Ursel =

Belgian diplomat

Léon (Léo) Leopold Marie count d'Ursel (Bruxelles, 7 August 1867 - Bettignies, France – 26 June 1934) was a Belgian diplomat.

== Family ==
He was the youngest son of Léon, 5th Duke of Ursel and his wife Madelein d'Harcourt. In Paris he married Jeanne, countess de Francqueville and had 6 children.

== Career ==
On 31 January 1919, he was named as plenipotentiary minister and in special mission of the King of the Belgians to the Holy See. He was also secretary of the Minister of Foreign Relations during Julien Davignon's tenure.

== Honours ==
- Vatican: Knight Grand Cross of the Order of St. Gregory the Great.
- Kingdom of Belgium:
  - Commander of the Order of Leopold.
  - Commander of the Order of the Crown.
- France: Commander of the Legion of Honour.
- Kingdom of Portugal: Commander of the Military Order of Christ.
- Kingdom of Prussia:
  - 1st Class of the Order of the Crown of Prussia.
  - 2nd Class of the Order of the Red Eagle.
- Empire of Japan: 2nd Class of the Order of the Rising Sun.
- 2nd Class of the Order of the Double Dragon.
- member of the Order of Albert the Bear.
