= Louise Élisabeth =

Louise Élisabeth is the name of several people:

- Louise-Élisabeth of France (1727-1759, the eldest daughter of King Louis XV of France
- Louise Élisabeth d'Orléans (1709-1742), Queen consort of King Louis I of Spain
- Marie Louise Élisabeth d'Orléans (1695-1719), wife of Charles, Duke of Berry
- Louise Élisabeth de Bourbon (1693-1775), daughter of Louis III, Prince of Condé
- Louise Élisabeth de Croÿ (1749-1832), Governess of the Children of France from 1789 to 1792
