= Louise d'Orléans (disambiguation) =

Louise d'Orléans (1812–1850) was Queen of the Belgians as the second wife of King Leopold I.

Louise d'Orléans may also refer to:

- Louise Adélaïde d'Orléans (1698–1743)
- Louise Élisabeth d'Orléans (1709–1742)
- Louise Diane d'Orléans (1716–1736)
- Louise Marie d'Orléans (1726–1728)
- Louise d'Orléans (1869–1952)
- Princess Louise of Orléans (1882–1958)
