= Louise Élisabeth d'Orléans =

Queen of Spain in 1724

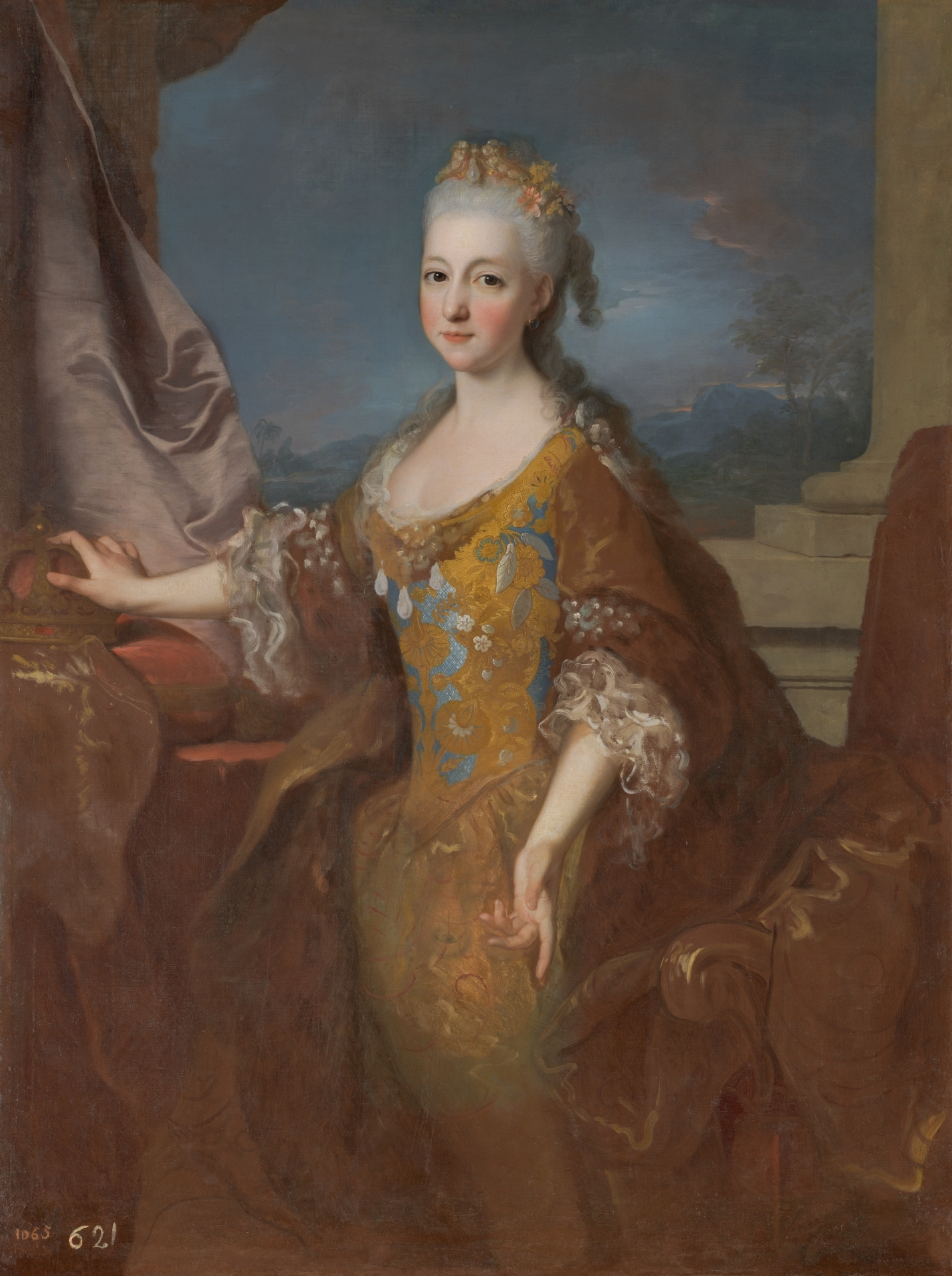
- Portrait by Jean Ranc, 1724

Queen consort of Spain
- Tenure: 15 January 1724 – 31 August 1724
- Born: 11 December 1709; Palace of Versailles, Versailles, France
- Died: 16 June 1742 (aged 32); Luxembourg Palace, Paris, France
- Burial: 21 June 1742; Église Saint-Sulpice, Paris, France
- Spouse: Louis I of Spain (m. 1722; died 1724)
Names
- French: Louise Élisabeth d’Orléans; Spanish: Luisa Isabel de Orleans
- House: Orléans
- Father: Philippe II, Duke of Orléans
- Mother: Françoise Marie de Bourbon

Louise Élisabeth d'Orléans (9 December 1709 – 16 June 1742) was Queen of Spain as the wife of King Louis I. Their reign is regarded as one of the shortest in history, lasting for seven months. Louise Élisabeth was the fourth daughter to survive to adulthood born to Philippe II, Duke of Orléans and Françoise Marie de Bourbon.

Louise Élisabeth was often disliked at the Spanish royal court, due to the many incidents and scandals revolving around her—those include social faux pas, walking around the palace unclothed, and provoking others by displaying her intimate parts in public. However, modern-day diagnoses claim her exhibitionist behaviour to be caused by a severe borderline personality disorder.

After being widowed, Louise Élisabeth returned to France and died at the Luxembourg Palace, located in Paris. Both she and her husband died without issue.

== Early years (1709–1720) ==
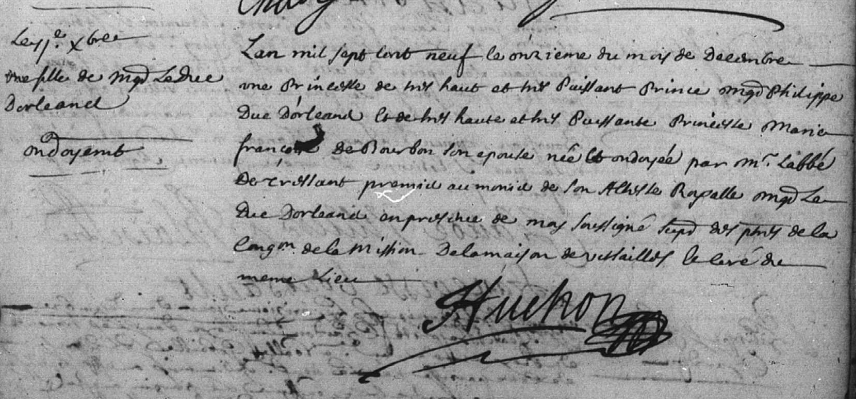
Birth certificate of Louise-Élisabeth d'Orléans, 11 December 1709 at the Palace of Versailles

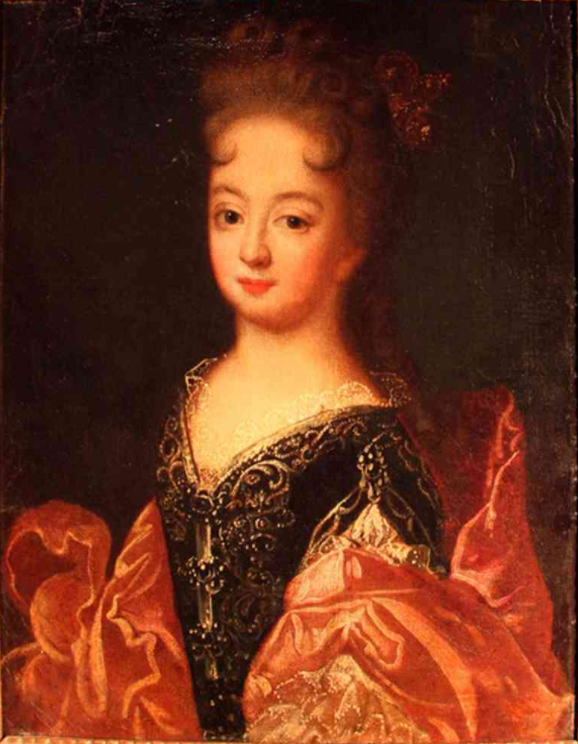
Louise Élisabeth as a girl aged 9 (portrait by Pierre Gobert, c. 1718–19)

Louise Élisabeth d’Orléans was the fifth child and fourth daughter born to Philippe II, Duke of Orléans and his wife, Françoise Marie de Bourbon. Her mother Françoise was one of the legitimised daughters born to King Louis XIV and his royal mistress, Madame de Montespan. As a member of the reigning House of Bourbon, Louise Élisabeth was entitled to the title of princesse du sang. Within her family, Louise Élisabeth was simply known as Élisabeth.

Élisabeth was born at the Palace of Versailles, as her parents’ fourth surviving daughter. Prior to her marriage, she was known as Mademoiselle de Montpensier. Élisabeth grew up with one brother and five sisters; she and her only brother, Louis, were very close.

Élisabeth's education, similar to that of her sisters Charlotte and Adélaïde, was quite poor as very few people were interested in her. Like her younger sister Louise Diane, she received a convent education. Future-wise, it appeared that she would be destined to wed with an obscure German or Italian prince.

Since 1715, her father, Philippe, was the de facto ruler of France as the regent for Louis XV, but in 1718, the War of the Quadruple Alliance broke out between France and Spain. As such, in 1720, King Philip V of Spain wanted to make a peace agreement and proposed double marriage negotiations: his three-year-old daughter, Infanta Mariana Victoria, would marry the eleven-year-old Louis XV. Philip's son and heir, Louis, would then marry one of the regent's daughters.

== Princess of Asturias (1721–1724) ==
In November 1721, at the age of eleven, Élisabeth was married by proxy, in Paris. She and her sister Philippine Élisabeth soon left for Madrid. Despite an impertinent reception from the Spanish royal family, primarily by Elisabeth Farnese, the stepmother of her future husband, she married Louis of Spain on 20 January 1722 in Lerma. Her dowry contained 4 million livres.

She caused a conflict with her stepmother the queen by refusing the queen's favorite Marguerite-Therese Colbert the right to kiss her hand.

The relationship between her and Philippine, already strained, became more embittered when Philippine began to receive attention at the Spanish royal court due to her beauty, allure and intelligence. Élisabeth never received such attention upon her arrival. Her sister was later engaged to Infante Charles of Spain, another heir to the throne of Spain; but the marriage came to nothing, and her sister was later sent back to France, where she died due to smallpox at the age of nineteen in Paris.

As wife of an heir to the Spanish throne, Élisabeth assumed the title of Princess of Asturias.

== Queen of Spain ==
Arms of Louise Élisabeth as queen consort of Spain.

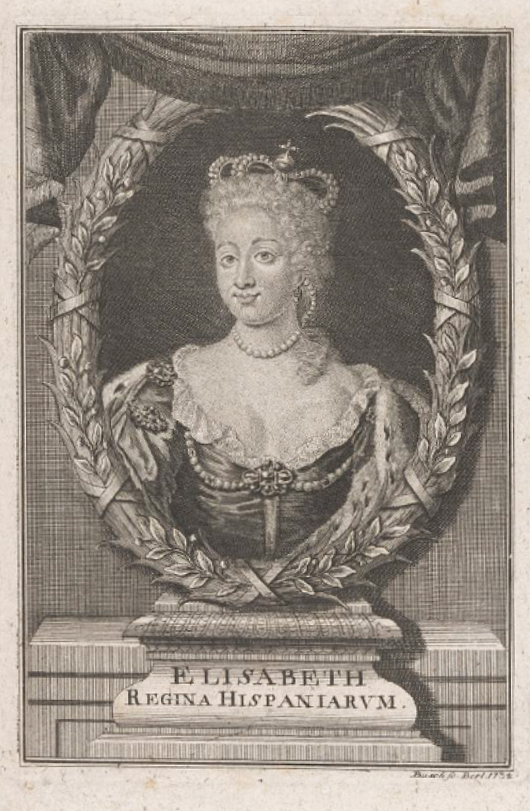
Louise Élisabeth depicted as Queen consort of Spain in a later engraving

On 15 January 1724, the emotionally unstable Philip V abdicated the throne in favour of his eldest son, who then became King Louis of Spain. Élisabeth, upon her husband ascending the throne, became queen of Spain. After only seven months of reigning Louis succumbed due to smallpox. Because he died without an heir, his father ascended the throne once again. Élisabeth stayed in Madrid for some time after the death of her husband, but her behaviour prior to her husband's untimely death had made her extremely unpopular in the Spanish court.

Since her arrival at the Spanish royal court, Louise Élisabeth became increasingly known for the numerous incidents she involved herself in. Some would be social faux pas, but her behaviour was usually erratic and extremely impulsive. She would walk around unclothed, belch and fart in public, run around the palace corridors, or jump off her horse to climb on trees. Modern diagnoses deem many of her behavioural traits compatible with an out-of-hand borderline personality disorder.

She would appear in public dirty and malodorous, she would refuse to use undergarments, and would try to provoke courtiers by showing her intimate parts in public. She would refuse to touch the food on her table but would then hide away and compulsively gobble down anything that she could put her hands on, whether it was edible or not. Her behaviour seemingly got worse over time. At some point, she developed the custom of cleaning the windows and tiles of the palace using her own clothes: she would leave her courtiers astonished by suddenly undressing in public to clean the windows in the room with her dress. Her husband, king Luis, eventually wrote to his father that:

"I see no other solution but to lock her down as soon as possible, for her troubles keep increasing."

He did make good on his promise and had her confined to a convent. Louise cried and sent her husband letters asking for forgiveness. He later felt sorry for her and released her. When her husband got sick with his final illness, however, she went out of her way to care for him, putting herself at risk of contagion. Still, her unpopularity and odd behaviour meant that, upon Luis' death, her father-in-law king Philip V sought to have her marriage to Luis annulled. As a result, she lost a valuable pension as a former queen of Spain and was forced to move back to the Kingdom of France, where her cousin Louis XV refused to allow her to reside in Versailles.

== Widow (1724–1742) ==
After the death of her husband, she returned to France at the request of her mother, the Dowager Duchess of Orléans. She was obliged to live peacefully in Paris, away from the Court of her young cousin Louis XV. As the widow of the King of Spain, she was to receive an annual pension of 600,000 livres from the state; however, Spain would not pay because her marriage had been annulled. When she moved back to France, Louise Élisabeth was formally known as the queen dowager of Spain. This led to a dispute with her (elder) sister, Charlotte Aglaé. The duchess's coach had to let that of the younger Louise Élisabeth pass first, a queen having a higher rank than a duchess.

She discreetly travelled to Paris and resided in the Château de Vincennes and the Luxembourg Palace, which had been given to her sister by her father. Élisabeth died there on 16 June 1742. She was buried at the Église Saint-Sulpice church in Paris, close to the Luxembourg Palace, where her half-brother Louis Charles was a bishop.

== Ancestors ==
Ancestors of Louise Élisabeth d'Orléans

8. Louis XIII of France
4. Philippe I, Duke of Orléans
9. Anne of Austria
2. Philippe II, Duke of Orléans
10. Charles I Louis, Elector Palatine
5. Elizabeth Charlotte of the Palatinate
11. Charlotte of Hesse-Kassel
1. Louise Élisabeth d'Orléans
12. Louis XIII of France (= 8)
6. Louis XIV of France
13. Anne of Austria (= 9)
3. Françoise Marie de Bourbon
14. Gabriel de Rochechouart, 1st Duke of Mortemart
7. Madame de Montespan
15. Diane de Grandseigne

Louise Élisabeth d'Orléans House of Orléans Cadet branch of the House of Bourbon Born: 11 December 1709 Died: 16 June 1742
Spanish royalty
| Preceded by Elisabeth Farnese | Queen consort of Spain; 14 January 1724 – 6 September 1724 | Succeeded by Elisabeth Farnese |
