= Philippine Élisabeth d'Orléans =

- Mademoiselle de Beaujolais
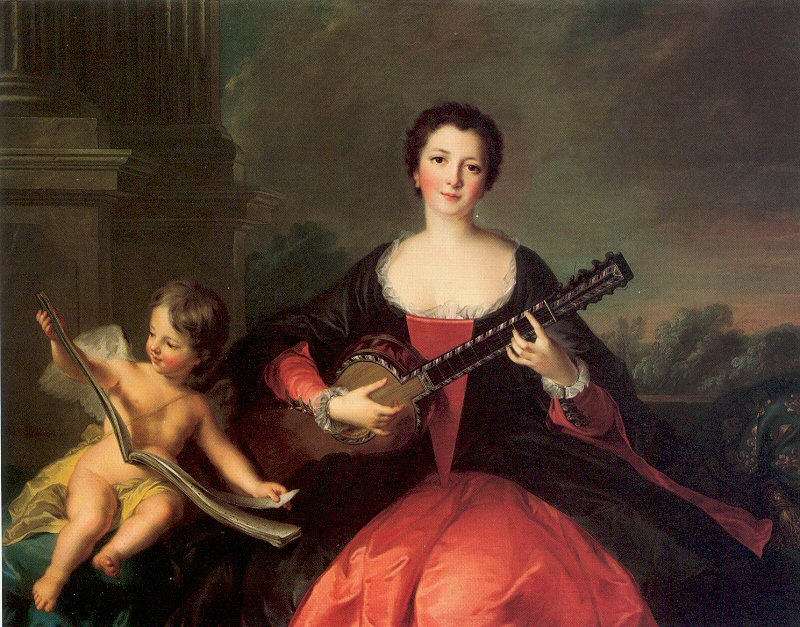
- Portrait by Jean-Marc Nattier
- Born: 18 December 1714; Palace of Versailles, France
- Died: 21 May 1734 (aged 19); Bagnolet, France
- Burial: 22 May 1734; Val-de-Grâce, Paris, France
Names
- Philippine Élisabeth Charlotte d'Orléans
- House: Orléans
- Father: Philippe II, Duke of Orléans
- Mother: Françoise-Marie de Bourbon

Philippine Élisabeth Charlotte d'Orléans (18 December 1714 – 21 May 1734) was the daughter of Philippe II, Duke of Orléans, and his wife, Françoise-Marie de Bourbon, the youngest legitimised daughter of King Louis XIV and Madame de Montespan. As a member of the reigning House of Bourbon and the House of Orléans, Philippine Élisabeth was a Princesse du Sang. She died of smallpox at the age of 19.

== Biography ==
Philippine Élisabeth Charlotte d'Orléans was born at the Palace of Versailles. She was the fifth surviving daughter of her parents and was known as Mademoiselle de Beaujolais in her youth. Brought up in a convent with her younger sister, Louise Diane d'Orléans, she grew up in the era of the Régence. She was named after her paternal grandparents, Philippe de France and Elizabeth Charlotte, Madame Palatine. She was one of eight children.

Her paternal grandmother, Elizabeth Charlotte of the Palatinate was warmly attached to her granddaughter and very devoted to her; she used to visit her almost every day at the Palais-Royal in Paris. Her maternal grandmother was Madame de Montespan, who had died in 1707, seven years before the birth of Philippine.

=== Betrothal ===
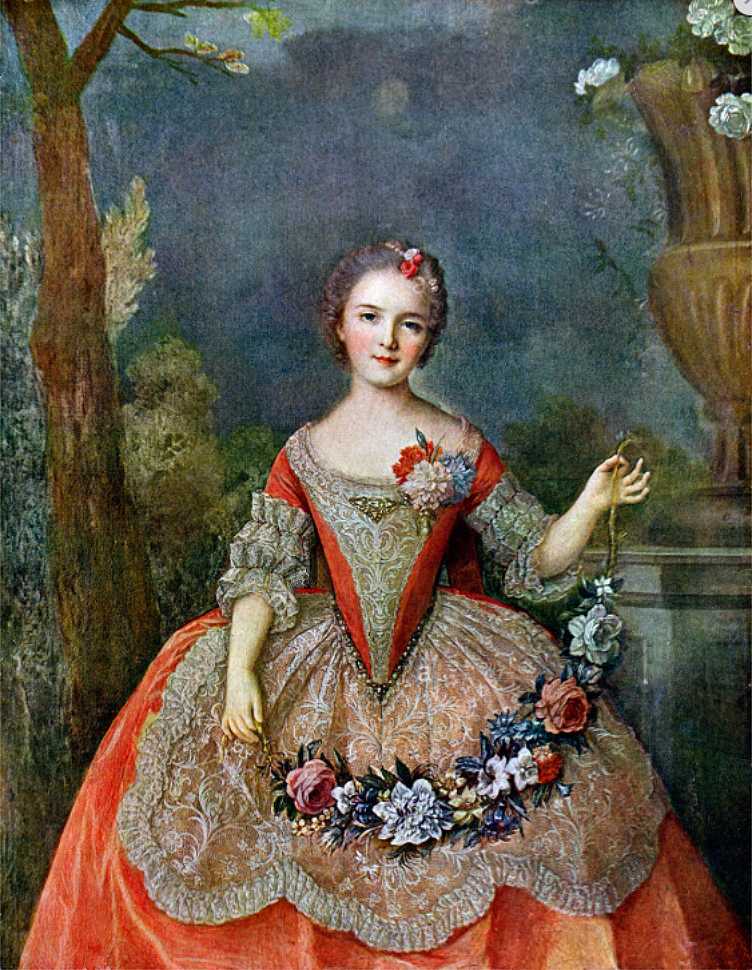
Philippine Élisabeth as a child, Jean-Marc Nattier.

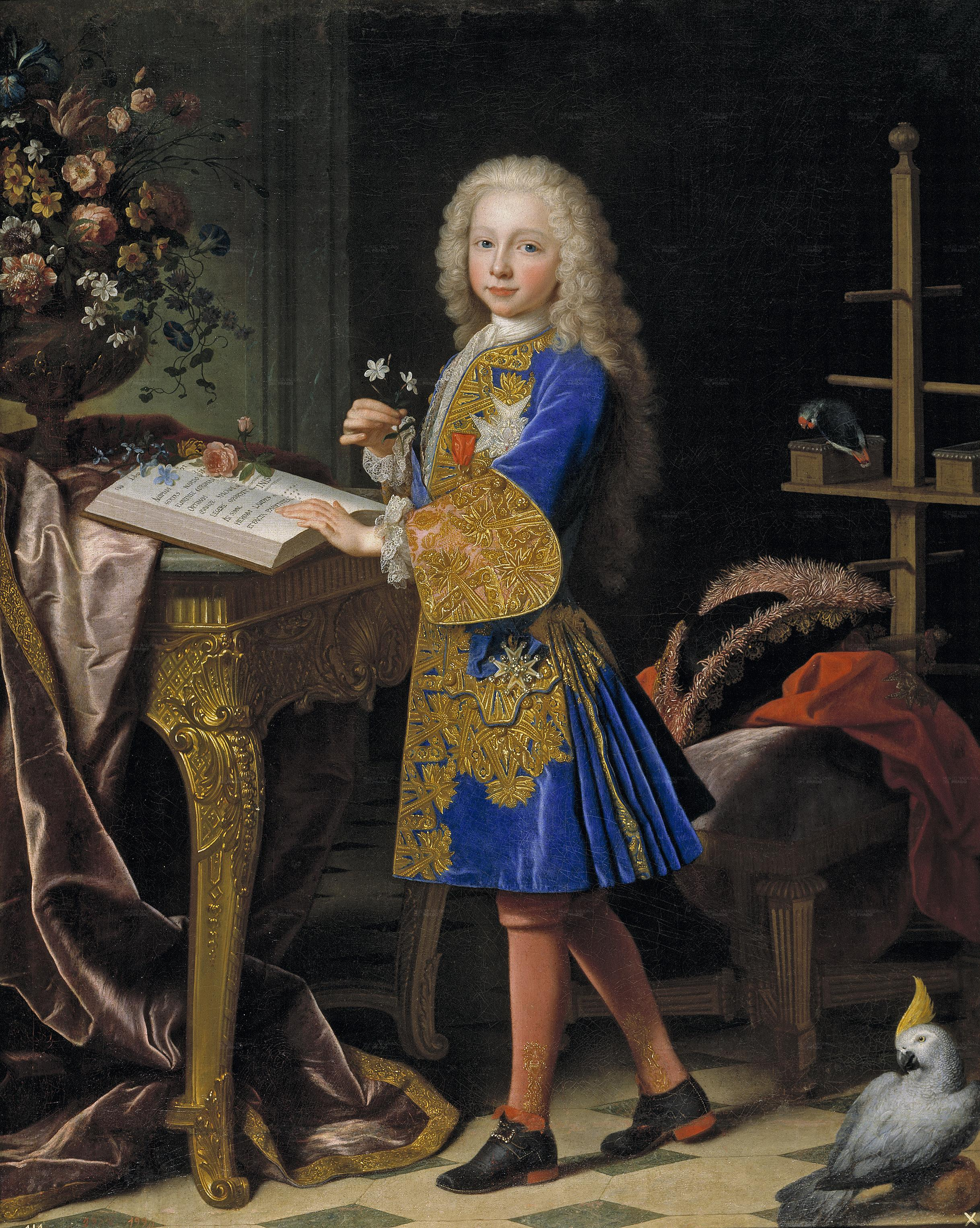
Infante Charles, Jean Ranc, 1724.

Since 1715, Philippine Élisabeth's father was de facto ruler of France as the Regent for the child King Louis XV of France. In 1718, the War of the Quadruple Alliance broke out between France and Spain. In 1720, King Philip V of Spain wanted to make peace and proposed a triple marriage; his three-year-old daughter, Infanta Mariana Victoria, would marry the ten-year-old Louis XV, and his sons, Luis, Prince of Asturias and Infante Carlos, would marry two of the Regent's daughters. Philippine would marry Infante Carlos, the younger of Philip V's sons.

Her future husband was expected to become the ruler of Tuscany as his half-brother the Prince of Asturias was the heir to the throne of Spain being his father's first son. The dowry, much like that of her older sister the Princess of Asturias amounted to 400,000 ecus given by the King of France, 40,000 by her father, and 50,000 in jewels by the King of Spain. There were also many gifts from the Louis XV. The Regent and the Duke of Chartres travelled with her as far as Bourg-la-Reine, as they had done with Louise Élisabeth the year before. She was also escorted by her half-brother Jean Philippe d'Orléans.

She arrived at Buitrago del Lozoya, a day's journey from Madrid; it was there that she met the royal family including King Felipe, Queen Isabel, her sister, the Prince of Asturias and her husband to be, Infante Carlos. Queen Isabel later wrote to the Regent and his wife:

" I believe, that you will not be displeased to learn of her first interview with her little husband. They embraced very affectionately and kissed one another, and it appears to me that he does not displease her. Thus, since this evening they do not like to leave one another. She says a hundred pretty things; one would not credit the things that she says, unless one heard them. She has the mind of an angel, and my son is only too happy to possess her. . . . She has charged me to tell you that she loves you with all her heart, and that she is quite content with her husband." And to the duchesse d'Orléans she writes : "I find her the most beautiful and most lovable child in the world. It is the most pleasing thing imaginable to see her with her little husband: how they caress one another and how they love one another already. They have a thousand little secrets to tell one another, and they cannot part for an instant."

The relationship with her sister, which had never been good, became more sour due to the young Philippine gaining all the attention of the Spanish court for her beauty and intelligence; something which never happened to Louise Élisabeth upon her arrival to the cold and formal Spanish court. Her engagement with Charles was later dissolved, so she was called back to France in 1728.

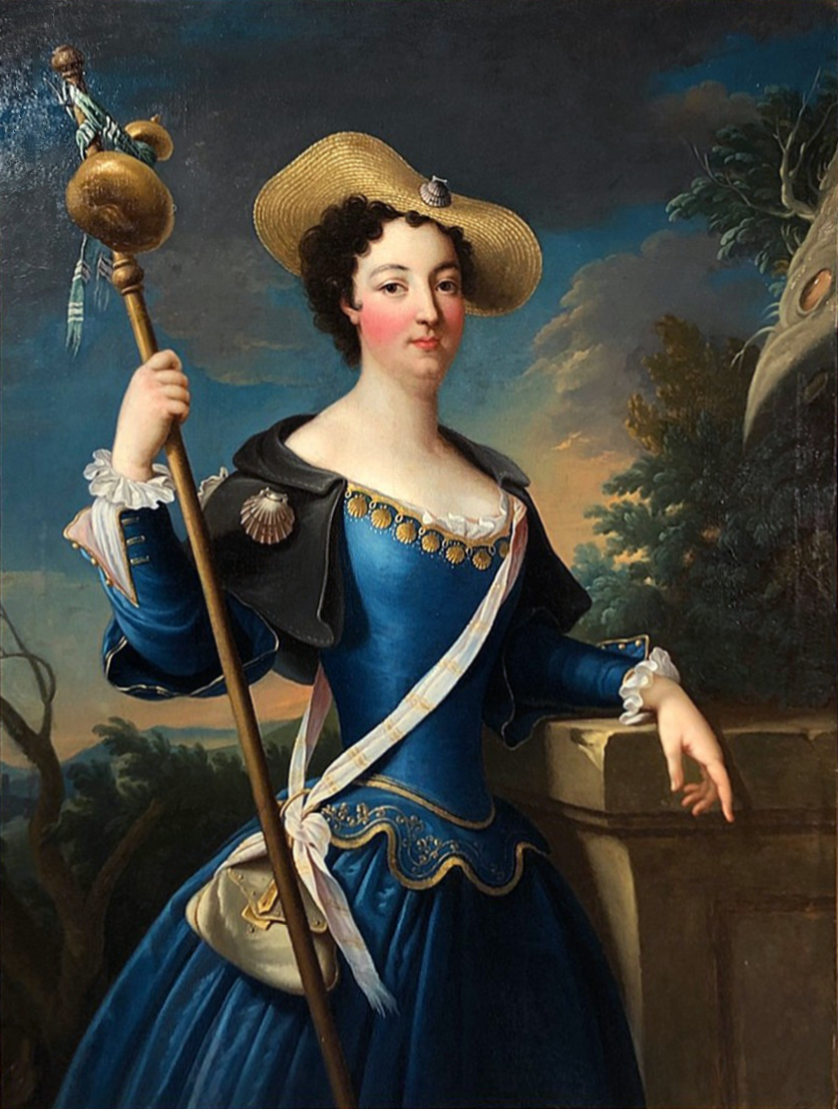
Portrait by Gobert, c. 1730.

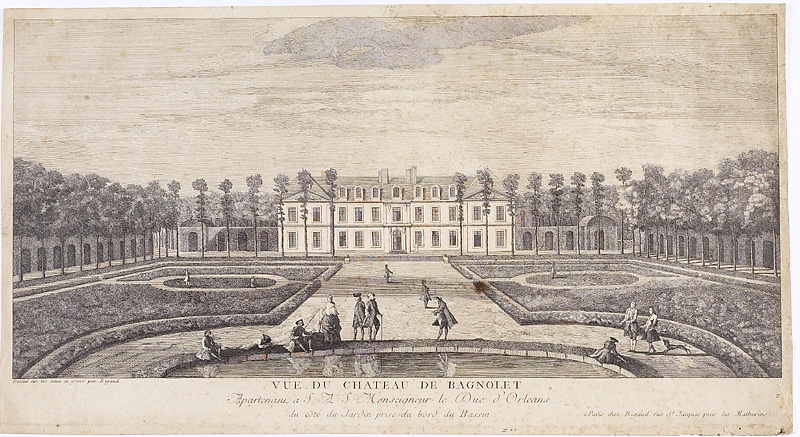
The Château de Bagnolet, where Philippine Élisabeth died aged 19. Engraving by Jacques Rigaud.

The departure of Philippine was seen as a sad affair, unlike that of her older sister Louise Élisabeth who had never been popular at the court. The Dowager Queen and Mademoiselle de Beaujolais arrived at the frontier of France at the foot of the Pyrenees mountains at Saint-Jean-Pied-de-Port. Onward they traveled, and despite what was expected, the two girls were unable to enter the town of Bayonne because their cousin, Louis Henri, Duke of Bourbon (and the Prime Minister) had failed to send orders to secure lodgings for his younger cousins. Their mother was obliged to send orders to make a suite of rooms at the Château de Vincennes where they arrived in June.

When her former fiancé became the Duke of Parma in 1731, the hopes of Philippine and her mother were revived into thinking that a marriage was still possible. Her mother approached the marquis de Bissy, who was the ambassador of France in Parma. Information that the Dowager Duchess of Orléans gained was that he had been faithful and that he had treasured a ring that had been given to him by Philippine. With the encouragement of the Duchess of Orléans, de Bissy went to Charles himself and asked him his thoughts on a possible re-uniting of the young couple. The new sovereign Duke said that he had wanted to marry young Philippine and he said to the Parmese minister to use any measure possible to secure his love's hand. The minister later said that he could not consent to help until he saw that there was no hostility on the side of Spain.

In 1733, the War of the Polish Succession broke out and caused international relations to shift. This war later made Charles the ruler of the Kingdom of the Two Sicilies. Despite that, Philippine did not see the day her love would become the King; while living quietly at her mother's favourite residence, the Château de Bagnolet in Bagnolet, she died of smallpox at the age of nineteen. Upon her death, the French writer Matthieu Marais wrote to President Bouhier:

" Everybody is in tears, and I also; she was a charming princess."

She was buried at the Val-de-Grâce convent in Paris on the day after she died.

== Ancestors ==
Ancestors of Philippine Élisabeth d'Orléans

8. Louis XIII of France
4. Philippe I, Duke of Orléans
9. Anne of Austria
2. Philippe II, Duke of Orléans
10. Charles I Louis, Elector Palatine
5. Elizabeth Charlotte, Madame Palatine
11. Charlotte of Hesse-Kassel
1. Philippine Élisabeth d'Orléans
12. Louis XIII of France (= 8)
6. Louis XIV of France
13. Anne of Austria (= 9)
3. Françoise Marie de Bourbon
14. Gabriel de Rochechouart, 1st Duke of Mortemart
7. Madame de Montespan
15. Diane de Grandseigne
