= Mademoiselle de Montpensier =

Mademoiselle de Montpensier may refer to one of the following:

- Marie de Bourbon, Duchess of Montpensier (1605-1627) daughter of Henri, Duke of Montpensier and Henriette Catherine de Joyeuse, wife of Gaston, Duke of Orléans.
- Anne Marie Louise d'Orléans, Duchess of Montpensier (1627-1693) daughter of Gaston, Duke of Orléans and the above, cousin of Louis XIV of France.
- Louise Élisabeth d'Orléans (1709-1742) daughter of Philippe d'Orléans, Duke of Orléans, Regent of France and Françoise Marie de Bourbon, wife of Louis I of Spain.
