= Pierre Gobert =

French painter (1662–1744)

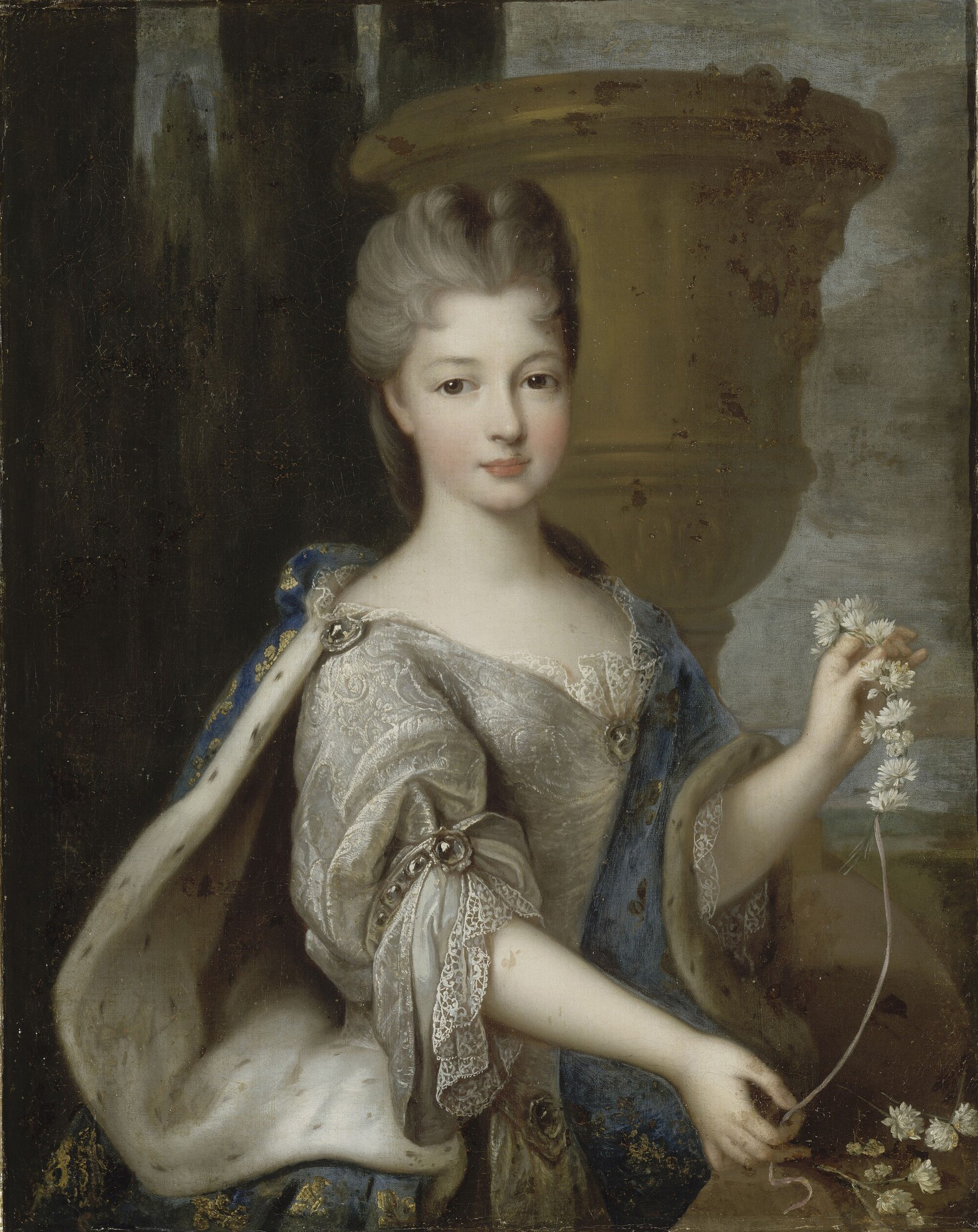
Pierre Gobert, Louise Élisabeth de Bourbon, princesse de Conti (1693–1775)

Pierre Gobert (French pronunciation: [pjɛʁ ɡɔbɛʁ]; 1 January 1662 – 13 February 1744) was a French painter.

== Life ==
He was born on 1 January 1662 in Fontainebleau, the son of the sculptor Jean II Gobert (1627–1681). Gobert entered the Royal Academy of Painting and Sculpture on 31 December 1701 as a portraitist. During the reign of Louis XIV he became the preferred painter of the great ladies of the court as evidenced by the large collection of portraits that he executed during that time. Gobert's style included incorporating the traits of mythology into his portraits.

He died on 13 February 1744.

== List of works ==
- Portrait of Mademoiselle de Blois en Galatée triomphante (c.1692) See Here
- Portrait of the duchesse du Maine
- Portrait of Mademoiselle de Chartres (1690–98)
- Portrait of Mademoiselle de la Mothe
- Portrait of Marquise du Deffand
- Portrait of the daughters of the prince de Condé (1689) See Here
- Portrait of Mademoiselle de Villefranche
- Portrait of Mademoiselle de Maupin
- Portrait of Mademoiselle de Chartres [niece of the above Mlle de Chartres] (c.1716) See Here
- Portrait of the Abesse de Chelles (1720)
- Portrait of the princesse de Conti
- Portrait of the princesse de Condé (1713) See Here
- Portrait of the duchesse de Bourgogne, (1704) See Here
- Portrait of the duchesse de Chartres, (1700) See Here
- Portrait of the Hereditary Prince of Lorraine (1710) See Here
- Portrait of Mademoiselle de Valois, (1717) See Here
- Portrait of the Family of the Duke of Valentinois
- Portrait of Mademoiselle de Chartres, See Here
- Portrait of Mademoiselle de Clermont, (1710–1720; held in the Royal Collection); See Here
- Portrait of the Anne de Baviére See Here
- Portrait of Louis XV of France (1716)
- Portrait of Yirmisekiz Mehmed Çelebi (1724); See here
- Portrait of Mademoiselle de La Roche sur Yon (?) See Here

Monsieur Gobert was also commissioned to do portraits of the Régent of France along with his second daughter Marie Louise Élisabeth d'Orléans (See here). Anne Louise Bénédicte de Bourbon was also a subject of his along with Louis XV. Louis XV's wife Marie Leszczyńska. Their eldest twin daughters, Princess Marie Louise Élisabeth and Princess Henriette Anne were also painted by Pierre in their infancy. Princess Marie Louise was also painted. He died at Paris.

== Gallery ==
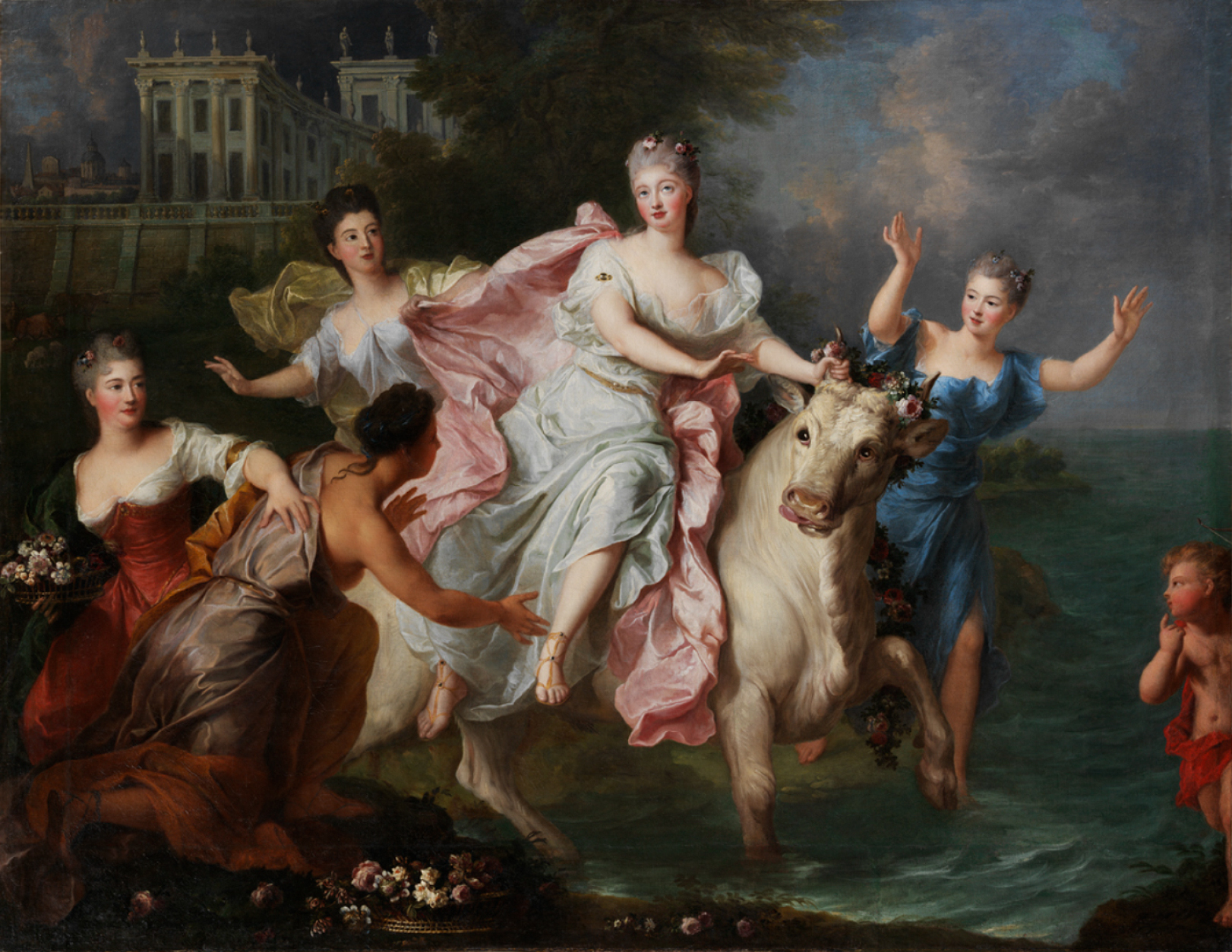
The Rape of Europa, 1710s

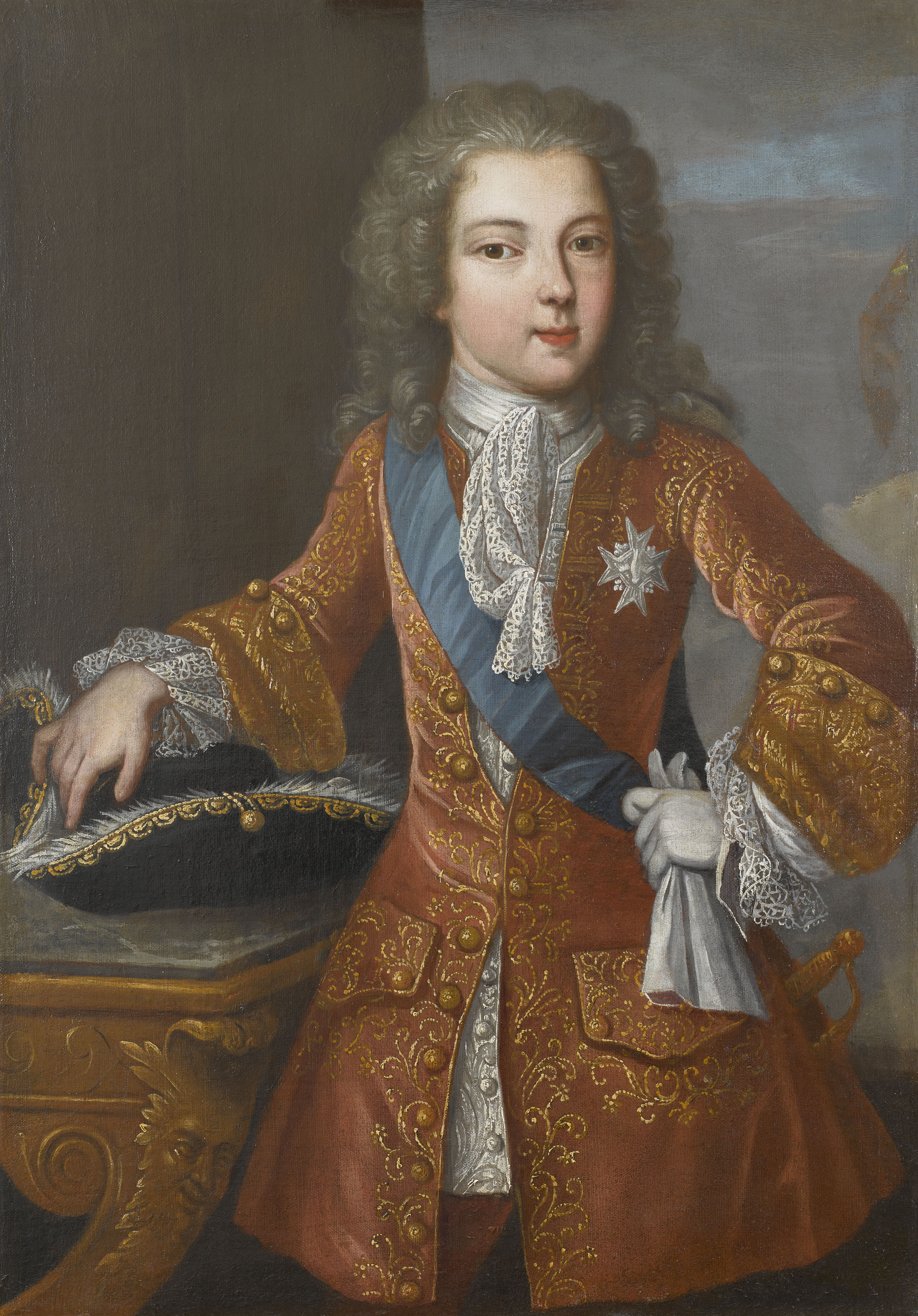
Louis XV as a child, 1720s

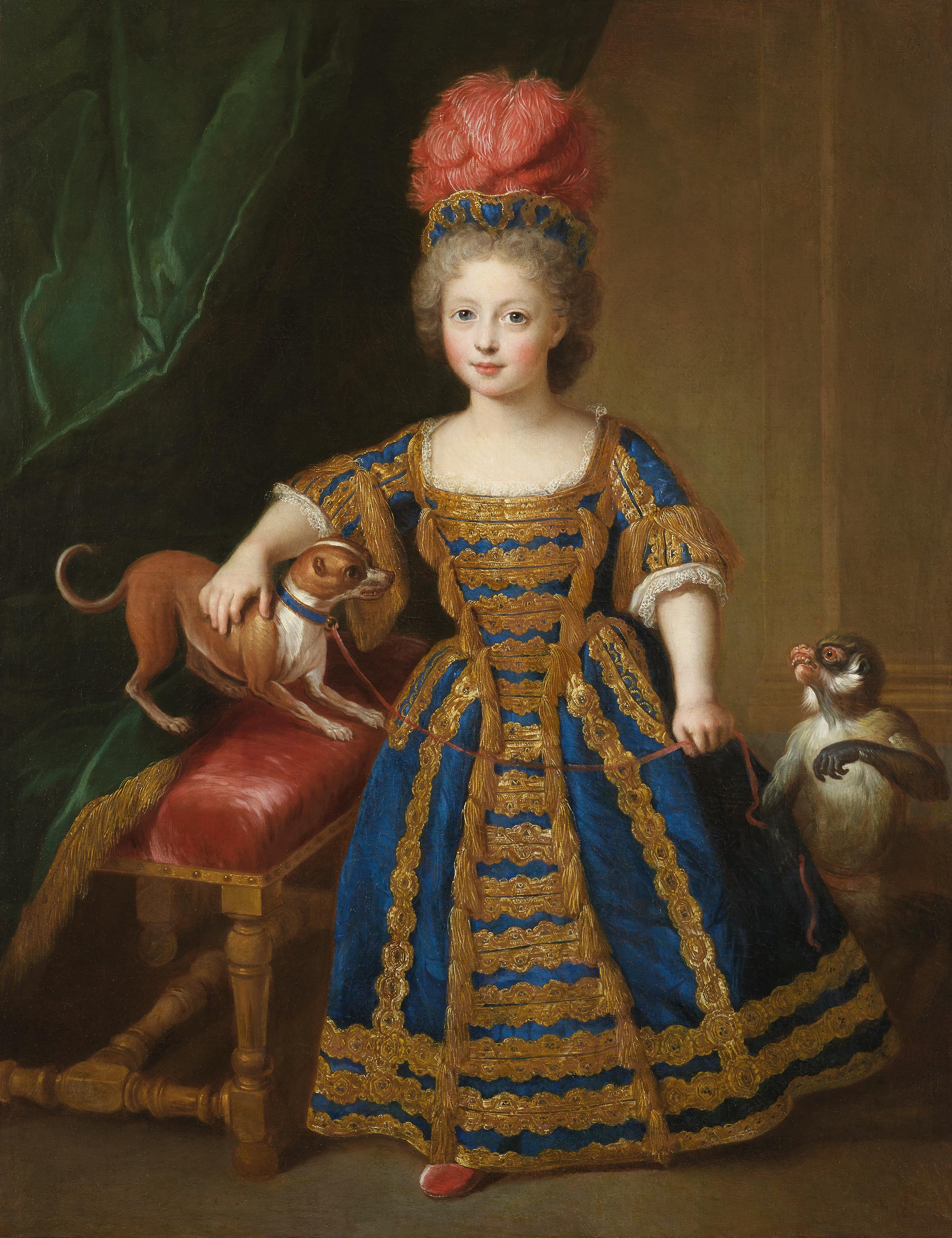
Francis III of Lorraine at the age of 3, 1712

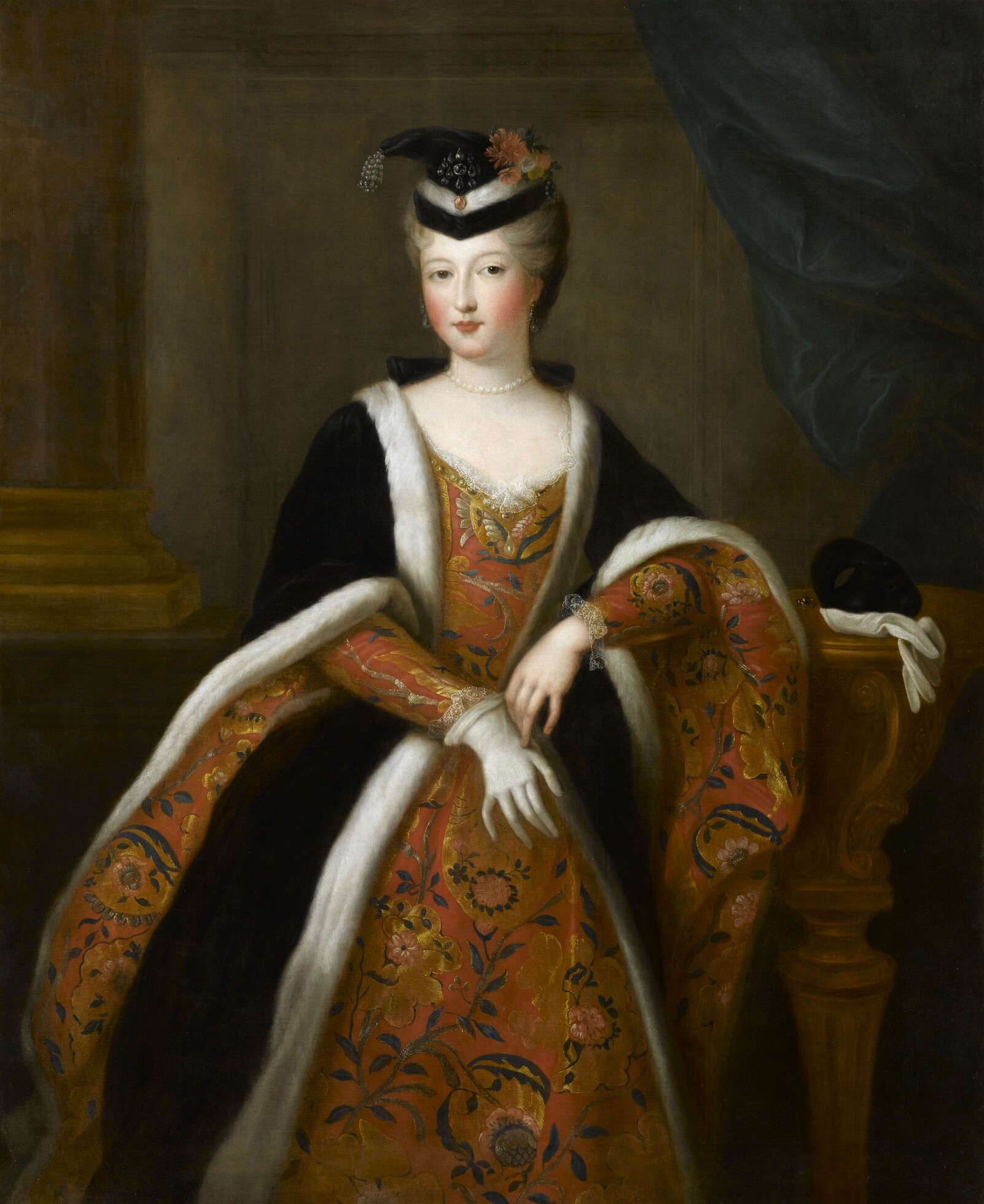
Françoise Marie de Bourbon

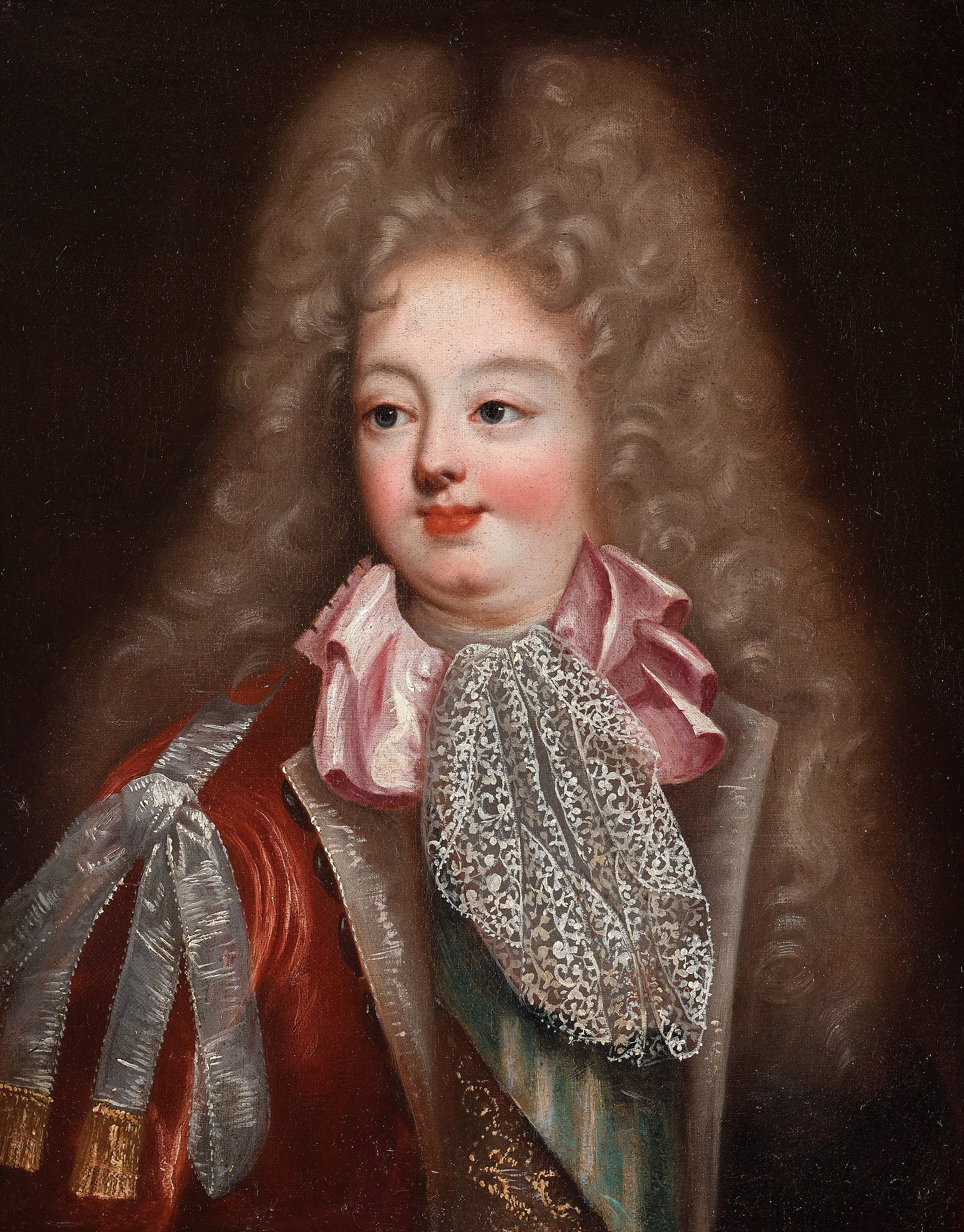
Charles, Duke of Berry

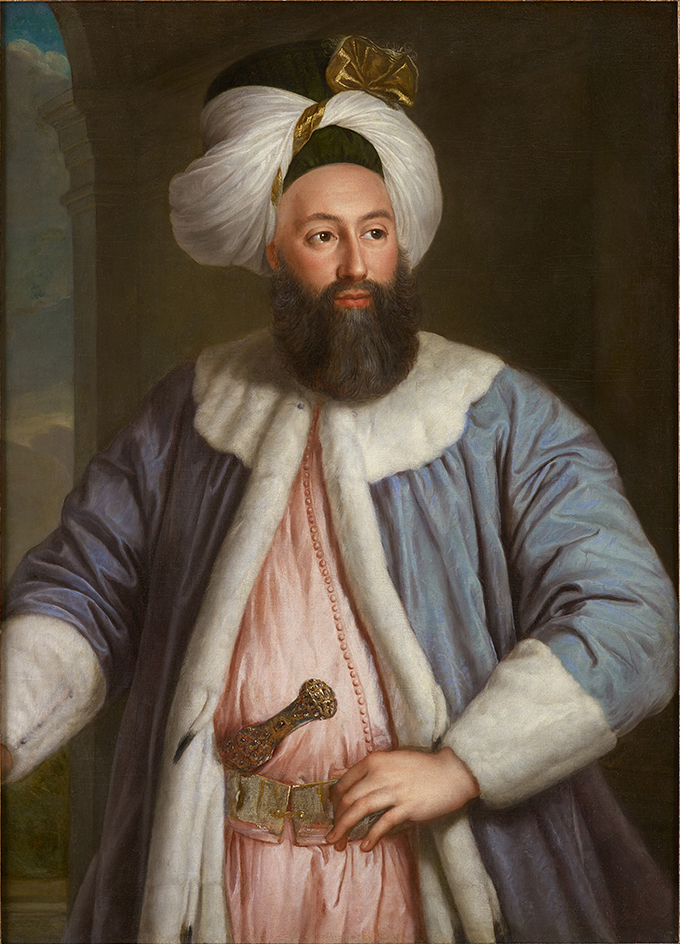
Yirmisekiz Mehmed Çelebi, 1724

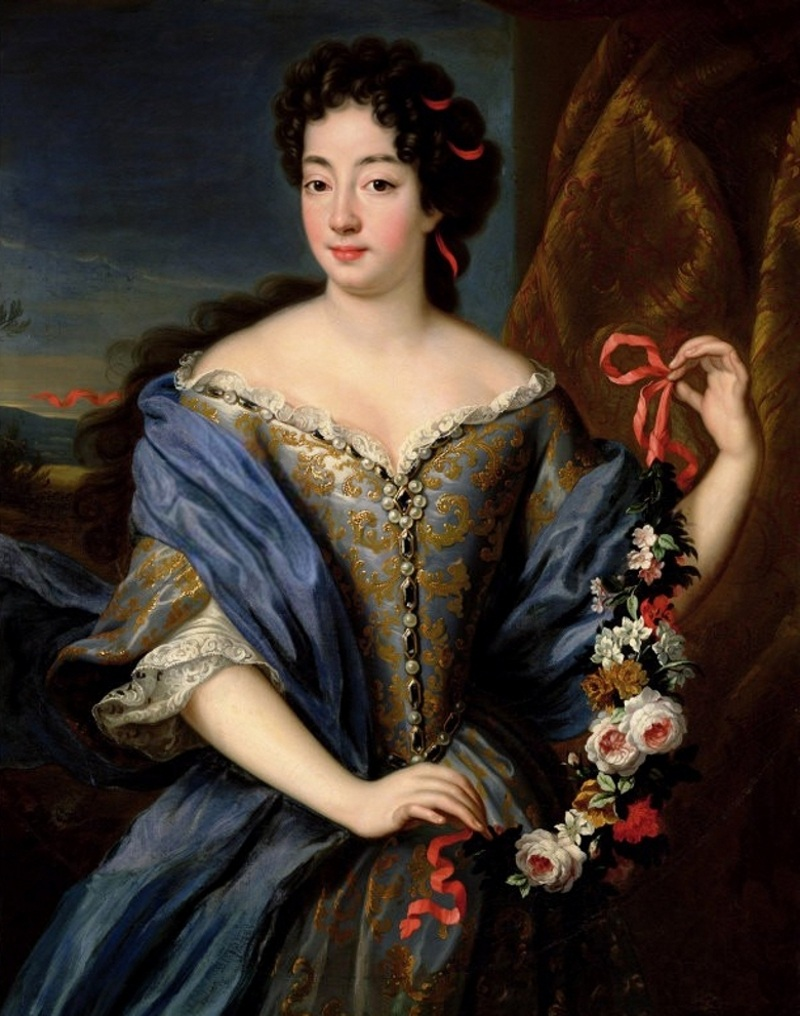
Anne Henriette of Bavaria

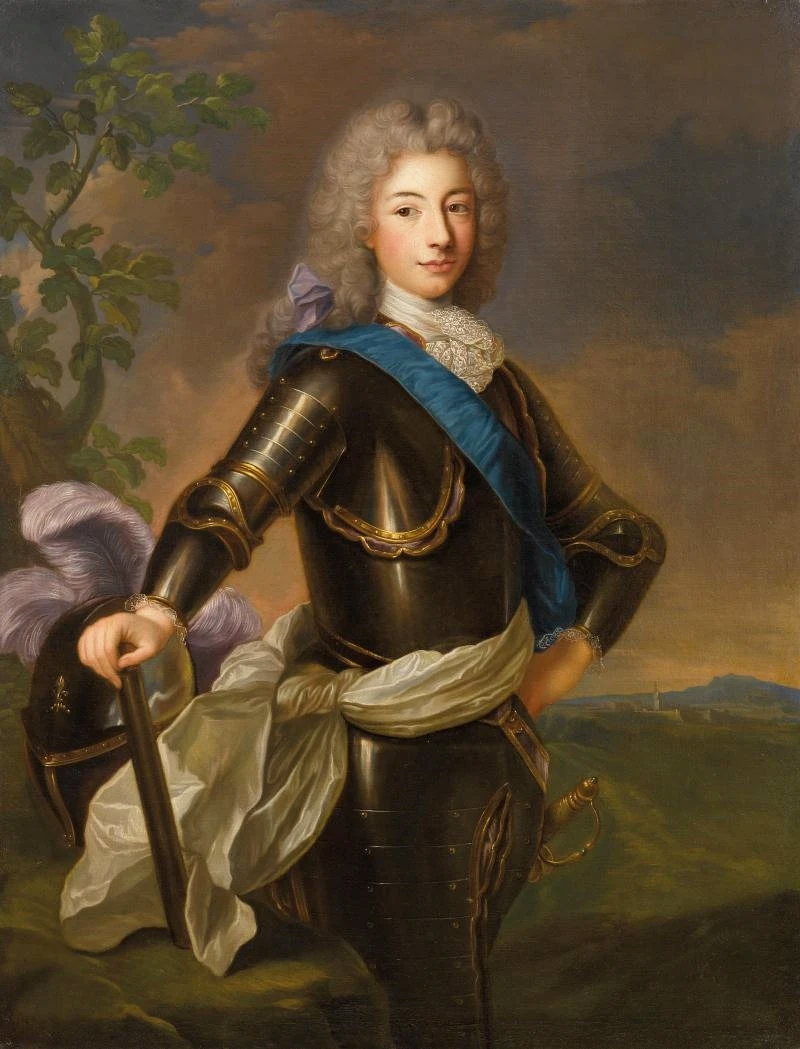
Louis François, Prince of Conti

== Bibliography ==
- Fernand Engerand, "Pierre Gobert, peintre de portrait", in "L’Artiste", Mars 1897, pp. 161–175.
- Klingsöhr-Leroy, Cathrin (2003). "Gobert, Pierre". Grove Art Online.
