= Françoise Marie de Bourbon =

Duchess of Orléans; legitimized daughter of Louis XIV

- Légitimée de France; Duchess of Orléans
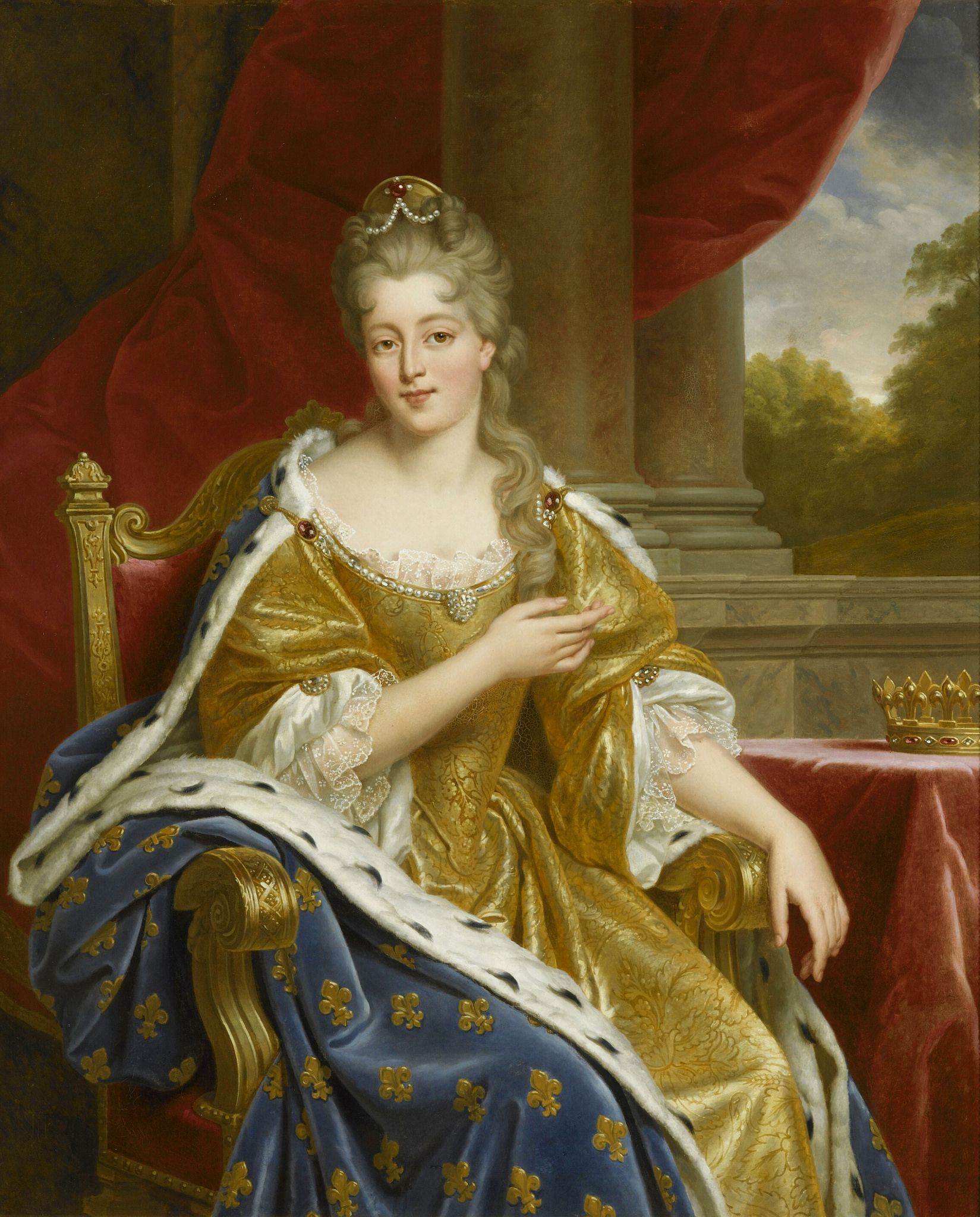
- Born: 4 May 1677; Château de Maintenon, Maintenon, France
- Died: 1 February 1749 (aged 71); Palais-Royal, Paris, France
- Burial: 6 February 1749; Église de la Madeleine de Trainel, Paris, France
- Spouse: Philippe II, Duke of Orléans (m. 1692; died 1723)
- Issue Detail: Louise Élisabeth, Duchess of Berry; Louise Adélaïde, Abbess of Chelles; Charlotte Aglaé, Duchess of Modena; Louis, Duke of Orléans; Louise Élisabeth, Queen of Spain; Philippine Élisabeth, Mademoiselle de Beaujolais; Louise Diane, Princess of Conti
- House: Bourbon
- Father: Louis XIV
- Mother: Madame de Montespan

Françoise Marie de Bourbon (Légitimée de France; 4 May 1677 – 1 February 1749) was the youngest illegitimate daughter of King Louis XIV of France and his maîtresse-en-titre, Madame de Montespan. At the age of 14, she married her first cousin Philippe d'Orléans, the future regent of France during the minority of Louis XV. Through two of her eight children, she became the ancestress of several of Europe's Roman Catholic monarchs of the 19th and 20th centuries—notably those of Belgium, Italy, Portugal, Spain, and France.

Françoise Marie wielded little political influence. In 1718, she participated in the botched Cellamare Conspiracy, during which the conspirators orchestrated to oust her husband as regent in favour of her brother Louis Auguste, Duke of Maine.

== Early life (1677–1692) ==
Françoise Marie was born in 1677 at the Château de Maintenon, owned since 1674 by Madame de Maintenon, the governess of Madame de Montespan's illegitimate children by King Louis XIV. She and her younger brother, Louis Alexandre, Count of Toulouse were cared for by Madame de Monchevreuil, Madame de Colbert, and Madame de Jussac under Mme. de Maintenon's supervision, as their mother was ostracised from court eventually. As a child, she also went to Versailles to visit her parents occasionally.

=== Mademoiselle de Blois ===
On 22 November 1681, when she was four and a half years old, Louis XIV legitimised Françoise Marie and gave her the courtesy title of Mademoiselle de Blois, a style once held by her older half-sister Marie Anne de Bourbon, a legitimised daughter of the king by Louise de La Vallière. Louis XIV did not mention his daughter's mother in the act of legitimisation because Madame de Montespan was still married to the Marquis de Montespan, who might have counter-claimed paternity and custody of his wife's children. By the time of her birth, her parents' relationship was coming to an end because of Madame de Montespan's possible involvement in the Affaire des poisons.

Her older siblings Louis Auguste and Louise Françoise had been legitimised on 19 December 1673 by letters patent registered at the Parlement of Paris. Her younger brother, Louis Alexandre, was legitimised at the same time as she and received the title of comte de Toulouse. She remained close to him and their older brother, Louis-Auguste de Bourbon, Duc du Maine, for her entire life. However, she never had closeness to her legitimate half-brother, Louis, Dauphin of France.

She inherited her mother's beauty, such that Madame de Caylus commented that Françoise was "naturally timid and glorious and was a little beauty with a beautiful face and beautiful hands; completely in proportion". She took pride in her royal ancestry and the royal blood of the House of Bourbon that she inherited from her father. Later, it was joked that she would "remember she was a daughter of France, even while on her chaise percée". The Marquis d'Argenson said she was very like her mother, but had also Louis XIV's orderly mind, failing of injustice, and that of his harshness.

== Marriage ==
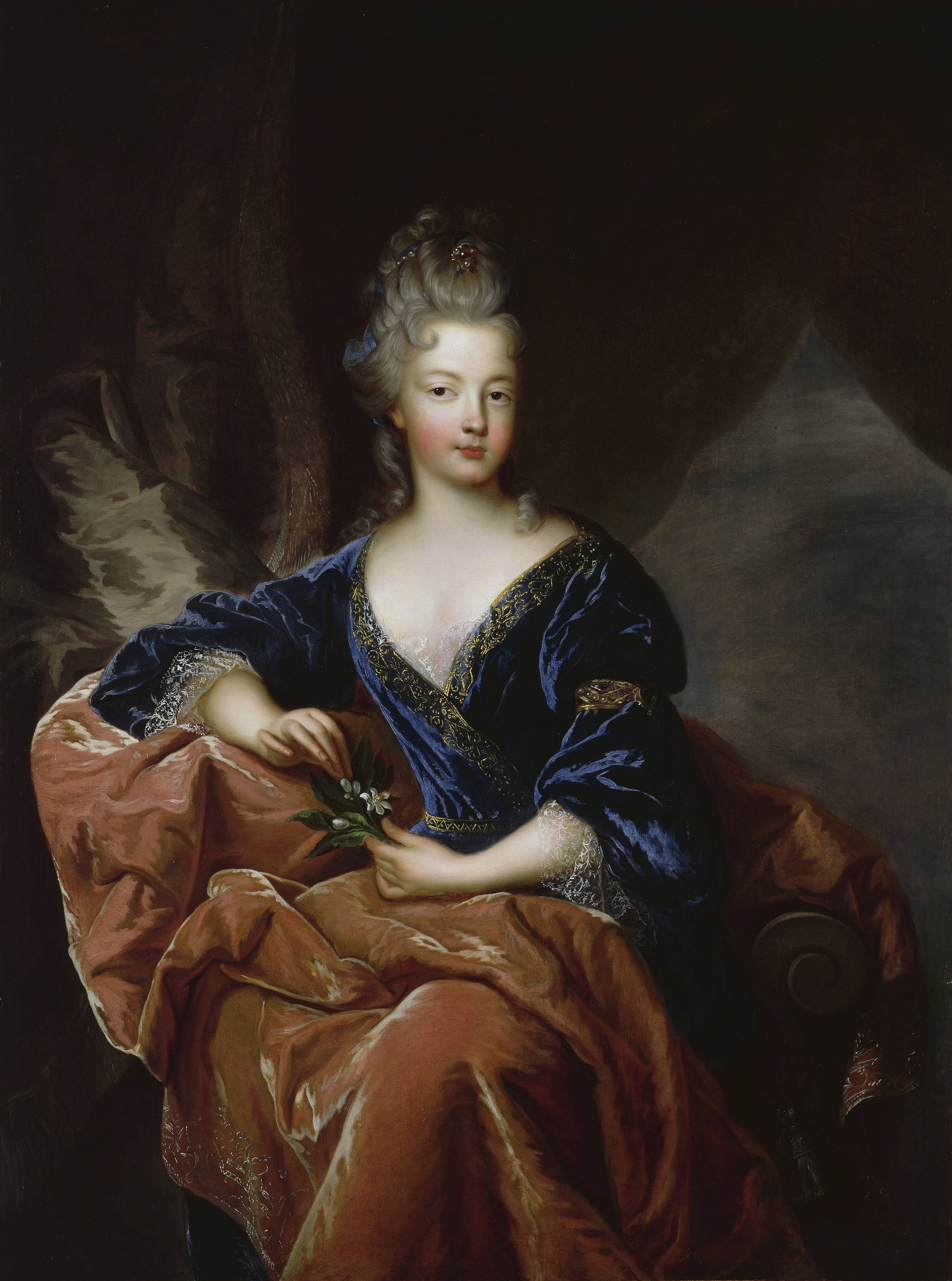
Portrait of Françoise Marie (by François de Troy, ca. 1692)

Madame de Maintenon was a childless widow who, as the king's morganatic wife from the mid-1680s, promoted her charges' interests, scandalising the court by securing the marriage of Mlle de Blois to the king's only legitimate nephew, Philippe d'Orléans in 1692. Then known by his father's subsidiary title, Duke of Chartres, he was the son of Philippe de France, Duc d'Orléans, known, as the king's only brother, as Monsieur. The mésalliance between bastard and legitimate blood royal disgusted Philippe's mother, Elizabeth Charlotte of the Palatinate, who harbored well-known prejudice against her brother-in-law's bastards. Upon learning of her son's acquiescence to the betrothal, she slapped him in front of the court, then turned her back on the king who had bowed in salutation to her. She remained an enemy to her daughter-in-law and indifferent to her grandchildren by her.

On the occasion of the marriage between their respective children, Louis XIV gave to his brother the Palais-Royal in which the Orléans had resided, but had not owned. It was the Palais Cardinal previously, but Cardinal Richelieu, its builder, bequeathed it to the crown upon his death in 1642. Louis XIV also promised an important military post to the Duke of Chartres and gave 100,000 livres to the Duke of Orléans' favourite, the Chevalier de Lorraine. Upon being informed of the identity of her future husband, Françoise remarked:

Je ne me soucie pas qu'il m'aime, je me soucie qu'il m'épouse. ("I care not that he love me, but that he marries me")

Françoise and Philippe d'Orléans married on 18 February 1692 in the chapel of the Palace of Versailles. Cardinal de Bouillon - a member of the House of La Tour d'Auvergne - conducted the service. In 1685, the Cardinal de Bouillon had refused to take part in the marriage of the Duke of Bourbon and Françoise's sister, Mademoiselle de Nantes, and, as a result, had been sent into exile, but he was recalled to marry Françoise and the Duke of Chartres. After the ceremony, a banquet was given in the Hall of Mirrors with all the princes and princesses of the blood in attendance. Other guests included the exiled James II of England and his consort, Mary of Modena. At the newlyweds' bedding ceremony later that evening, Queen Mary handed the new Duchess of Chartres her night shirt. Madame de Montespan had not been invited to the wedding of her daughter.

As her new husband was a legitimate grandson of a king, Françoise assumed the rank of petite-fille de France ("Grand-Daughter of France"), and was addressed as Royal Highness. Furthermore, the newlyweds traveled and lodged wherever the king did, dined with him, and were entitled to armchairs in his presence. As the new duchesse de Chartres, Françoise Marie was next in precedence behind only the Duchess of Burgundy and her own mother-in-law, the Duchess of Orléans.

From her father, Françoise Marie received a dowry of more than two million livres, twice the sum bestowed on her older sister, Louise, who had married Louis, Duke of Bourbon, first prince of the blood royal, whose rank was deemed substantially lower than that of the king's nephew. This difference led to animosity between the sisters. The dowry was not to be paid until the Nine Years' War ended.

Around 1710, the proud Duke of Saint-Simon, a friend of Philippe d'Orléans, wrote an account describing Françoise Marie:

[i]n every way majestic; her complexion, her throat, her arms, were admirable; she had a tolerable mouth, with beautiful teeth, somewhat long; and cheeks too broad and too pendant, which interfered with, but did not spoil her beauty. What disfigured her the most were her eyebrows, which were, so to speak, peeled and red, with very little hair; she had, however, fine eyelashes, with well-set, chestnut-coloured hair. Without being humpbacked or deformed, she had one side larger than the other, which caused her to walk awry; and this defect in her figure indicated another, which was more troublesome in society and which inconvenienced herself.

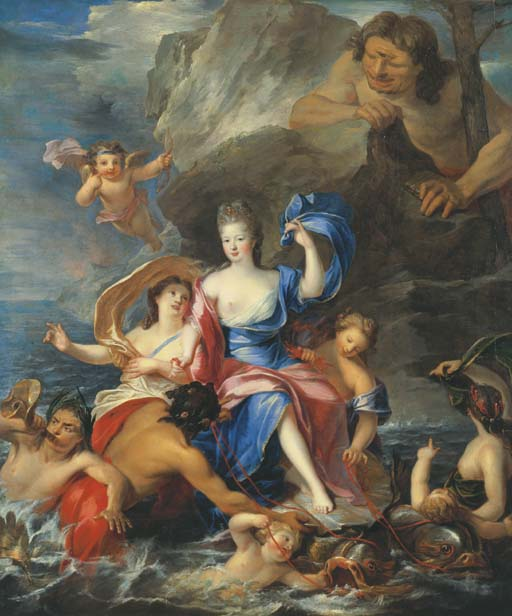
Mademoiselle de Blois as Galatea Triumphant (by Pierre Gobert, 1692)

Her mother-in-law wrote the following in her memoirs:

all the ladies in waiting have made her believe that she did my son honour in marrying him; and she is so vain of her own birth and that of her brothers and sisters that she will not hear a word said against them; she will not see any difference between legitimate and illegitimate children.

Not long after their marriage, Philippe ridiculed his wife's bad temper openly and nicknamed her Madame Lucifer. Her mother-in-law said that during the early years of the Chartres marriage, Françoise was as "drunk as drunk" three to four times a week.

The union, despite open discord, produced eight children, several of whom later married into other European royal families during the Regency of her husband for the young King Louis XV. Françoise Marie was so annoyed at her children not being recognised as grandchildren of a king that Saint-Simon wrote:

The duchesse d'Orléans had a head filled with fantasies that she could not realise... Not content with the modern rank of Granddaughter of France, which she enjoyed through her husband, she could not bear the idea that her children were only Princes of the Blood and dreamed up a rank for them that was betwixt and between...great-Grandchildren of France.

== Duchess of Orléans (1701–1749) ==
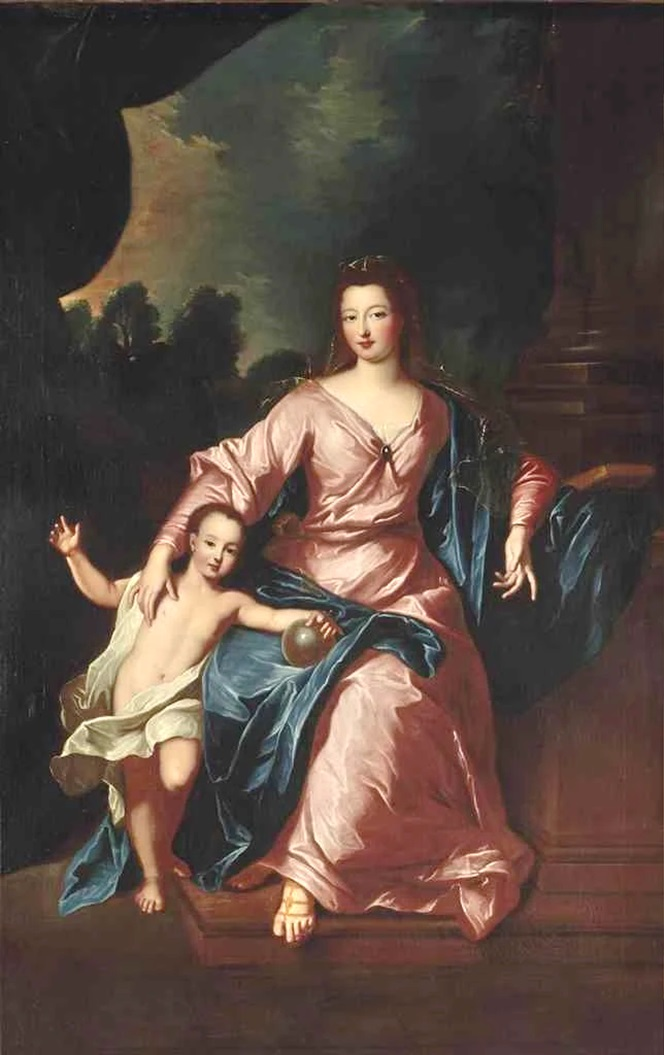
Françoise Marie with her son (by Pierre Gobert)

In 1701, upon the death of his father, her husband became Duke of Orléans, head of the House of Orléans and inherited his father's estates. The new Duchess of Orléans acquired precedence over her mother-in-law, ranking second only to the Dauphine (Duchess of Burgundy). Her father-in-law had died of a stroke at Saint-Cloud following an argument with Louis XIV at Marly concerning the Duke of Chartres' flaunting his pregnant mistress, Marie-Louise de Séry, in front of Françoise. Nonetheless, the new Duke and Duchess of Orléans pursued a lavish lifestyle at the Palais-Royal in Paris and the Château de Saint-Cloud, located some ten kilometers west of Paris. Among many other extravagances, they commissioned the renowned Jean Bérain the Elder to design and decorate their private apartments at the Palais-Royal.

While her husband led the debauched life of a womaniser, Françoise lived a quiet life without scandal, unlike her sisters, the Princess of Conti and the Duchess of Bourbon, and their older brother, the Duke of Maine. Though witty and charming, she preferred the company of Louise-Elvide, Duchess of Sforza, daughter of Françoise's aunt, Gabrièlle de Rochechouart de Mortemart. Her intimate circle included her other cousins, Marie Élisabeth de Rochechouart, Countess of Castries, who was also her lady-in-waiting, and the Duchess of Sforza's sister Diane-Gabrielle Damas de Thianges, Duchess of Nevers.

Two days after her birthday in 1707, Françoise Marie lost her mother who had lived in seclusion since being banished from court in 1691. Her father forbade his legitimised children to wear mourning clothes for their mother, but they chose to decline attending court gatherings during the mourning period, with the exception of their eldest brother, the Duke of Maine, who inherited the entirety of his mother's vast fortune.

In 1710 Louis XIV's youngest legitimate grandson, Charles, Duke of Berry, was still unmarried. It was suggested that he marry Louise Élisabeth de Bourbon, the daughter of Louise, Duchess of Bourbon. However, on 6 July 1710, Françoise secured the marriage of her eldest daughter, Marie Louise Élisabeth d'Orléans, to the duke, much to the annoyance of the Duchess of Bourbon. This marriage elevated Marie Louise Élisabeth to the rank of fille de France, above princesses of the blood.

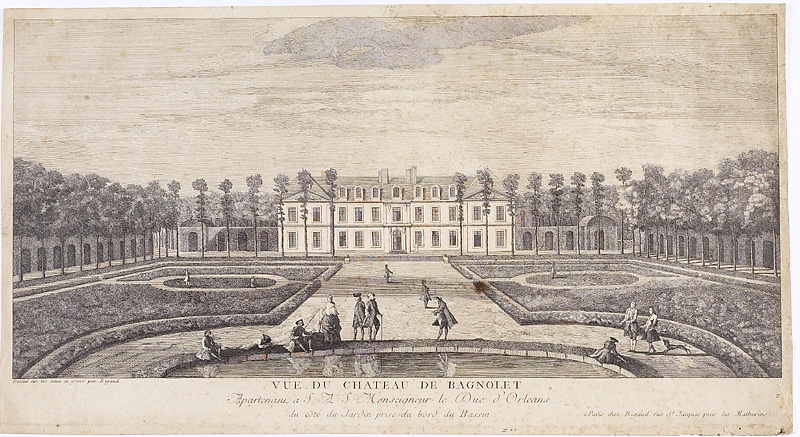
The Château de Bagnolet, Françoise Marie's favourite residence (engraving by Jacques Rigaud)

On the death of his great-grandfather Louis XIV, in 1715, the five-year-old Dauphin became the new king of France as Louis XV. Consequently, Françoise's older brother, the Duke of Maine, and her husband, the Duke of Orléans, experienced tension over who would be the regent during the minority of the new king. The Parlement of Paris ruled in favour of her husband. As the wife of the de facto ruler of France, Françoise became the most important lady of the kingdom. During the Regency, her husband increased her annual allowance to 400,000 livres. In March 1719, she acquired the château de Bagnolet near Paris and the estate passed to her son, Louis d'Orléans, Louis le Pieux, on her death. Françoise Marie extended the small château under the direction of Claude Desgots who also worked at the duc du Maine's château de Sceaux.

=== Family life ===
Her many daughters were rumoured to be promiscuous. Having become a widow, the Duchess of Berry accumulated lovers and hid several pregnancies. She almost died in labor early in 1719, having been denied the sacraments by the church and when she died on 21 July 1719, she was again pregnant. After the liaison of her favourite daughter, Charlotte Aglaé, with the libertine Louis François Armand du Plessis, duc de Richelieu was discovered, Françoise and her husband married her abroad swiftly. At the same time, the Cellamare Conspiracy was uncovered. Government authorities arrested and imprisoned The Duke and Duchess of Maine and the Cardinal de Richelieu for their involvement in the plot temporarily.

Earlier, Françoise had tried to marry either Louise Adélaïde or Charlotte Aglaé to the Duke of Maine's son, Louis Auguste, Prince of Dombes, but both refused their cousin. In 1721, she arranged for two of her other daughters, Louise Élisabeth, and Philippine Élisabeth, to marry into the royal family of Spain. Louise Élisabeth was to marry the Infante Luis Felipe of Spain, heir to the throne, while Philippine Élisabeth was to marry Luis Felipe's younger half-brother, the Infante Carlos. Both marriages took place but that of Philippine Élisabeth was annulled and she returned to France. She died at the château de Bagnolet in 1734.

After her husband died in December 1723, Françoise retired to Saint-Cloud.

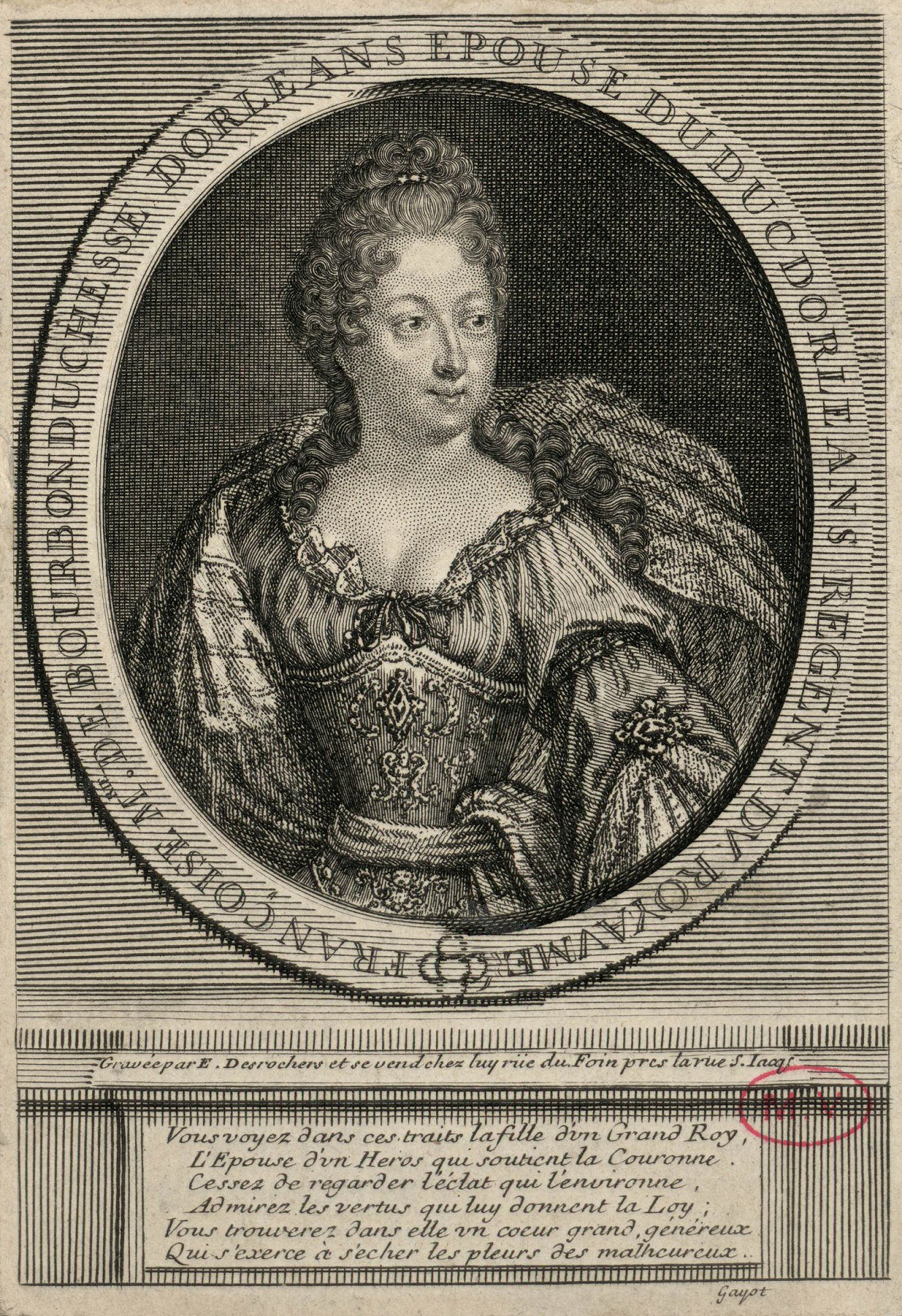
Françoise Marie as she appeared during the Regency (by Etienne Jahandier Desroches)

In 1725, Françoise Marie saw the marriage of her cousin, the young King Louis XV, to the Polish princess Marie Leszczyńska, diminishing her precedence at court, as did the births of their daughters. Unlike the other princesses of the blood, The Dowager Duchess of Orleans respected and got along well with Queen Marie and even organized parties in her honor at Francoise's Chateaus de Chaillon, Bagnolet and St.Cloud in 1736, 1740, 1743, 1744, and 1745, continuing until her death in 1749, which the Queen herself attended. In return, Marie Leczinska visited her palaces, talked to her in private, and followed her advice on etiquette regularly. As it turned out, the second of the king's eight daughters, Madame Henriette, fell in love with Françoise Marie's grandson, Louis Philippe, then the duc de Chartres. Louis XV would not, however, allow the marriage because he did not want the House of Orléans to come too close to the throne of France. Afterwards, it fell upon the dowager duchess to find her unwed grandson a suitable bride. At the direction of her son, Françoise Marie negotiated with her niece, Louise Élisabeth de Bourbon, for her grandson to marry Louise Élisabeth's attractive daughter, Louise Henriette de Bourbon. This marriage united a grandchild of Françoise Marie with a grandchild of her sister and enemy, the Duchess of Bourbon. Françoise Marie lived to see, in 1747, the birth of their great-grandson, the future Philippe Égalité.

The next of her daughters to marry was the youngest. Louise Diane, the favourite of Madame, was engaged to the young Louis François, Prince of Conti, whom she married at Versailles. Louise died in childbirth at the Château d'Issy. Louise Diane's only surviving child was the last Prince of Conti, who would later marry Princess Maria Fortunata of Modena. Maria Fortunata was one of the daughters of the wayward Charlotte Aglaé, Françoise Marie's most difficult daughter. She returned from Modena in a self-imposed exile many a time and Françoise Marie and her son Louis chose to ignore her when she did. She returned to Modena in 1737 as the Sovereign Duchess Consort.

== Death ==
Françoise died on 1 February 1749 at the Palais-Royal after a long illness, aged 71. She was the last surviving child of Louis XIV and outlived her husband by twenty-six years. Her children Charlotte Aglaé and Louis, Duke of Orléans, survived her. She was buried at the Church of Madeleine de Traisnel (Église de la Madeleine de Traisnel) in Paris, an old Benedictine church at 100 Rue de Charonne, on 6 February. Her heart was taken to the Val-de-Grâce.

At present, in the Royal Collection of the British royal family, there exists a miniature portrait by the Venetian painter Rosalba Carriera of Françoise. She poses as Amphitrite.

== Issue ==
1. Mademoiselle de Valois (17 December 1693 – 17 October 1694); died in infancy.
2. Marie Louise Élisabeth d'Orléans (20 August 1695 – 21 July 1719); married Charles of France, Duke of Berry. Had no surviving issue (all children died in infancy).
3. Louise Adélaïde d'Orléans (13 August 1698 – 10 February 1743); became a nun and Abbess of Chelles. Died unmarried and without issue.
4. Charlotte Aglaé d'Orléans (22 October 1700 – 19 January 1761); married Francesco III d'Este, Duke of Modena. Had issue.
5. Louis d'Orléans (4 August 1703 – 4 February 1752); married Margravine Johanna of Baden-Baden. Had issue.
6. Louise Élisabeth d'Orléans (11 December 1709 – 16 June 1742); married Louis I of Spain. No issue.
7. Philippine Élisabeth d'Orléans (18 December 1714 – 21 May 1734); died unmarried. No issue.
8. Louise Diane d'Orléans (27 June 1716 – 26 September 1736); married Louis François de Bourbon. Had issue.

== Ancestry ==
Ancestors of Françoise Marie de Bourbon

8. Henry IV of France
4. Louis XIII of France
9. Marie de' Medici
2. Louis XIV of France
10. Philip III of Spain
5. Anne of Austria
11. Margaret of Austria
1. Françoise Marie de Bourbon
12. Gaspard de Rochechouart, marquis de Mortemart
6. Gabriel de Rochechouart, duc de Mortemart
13. Louise de Maure, comtesse de Maure
3. Madame de Montespan
14. Jean de Grandseigne, marquis de Marsillac
7. Diane de Grandseigne
15. Catherine de La Béraudière, dame de Villenon
