= Charles, Duke of Berry (1686–1714) =

Charles
- Duke of Berry
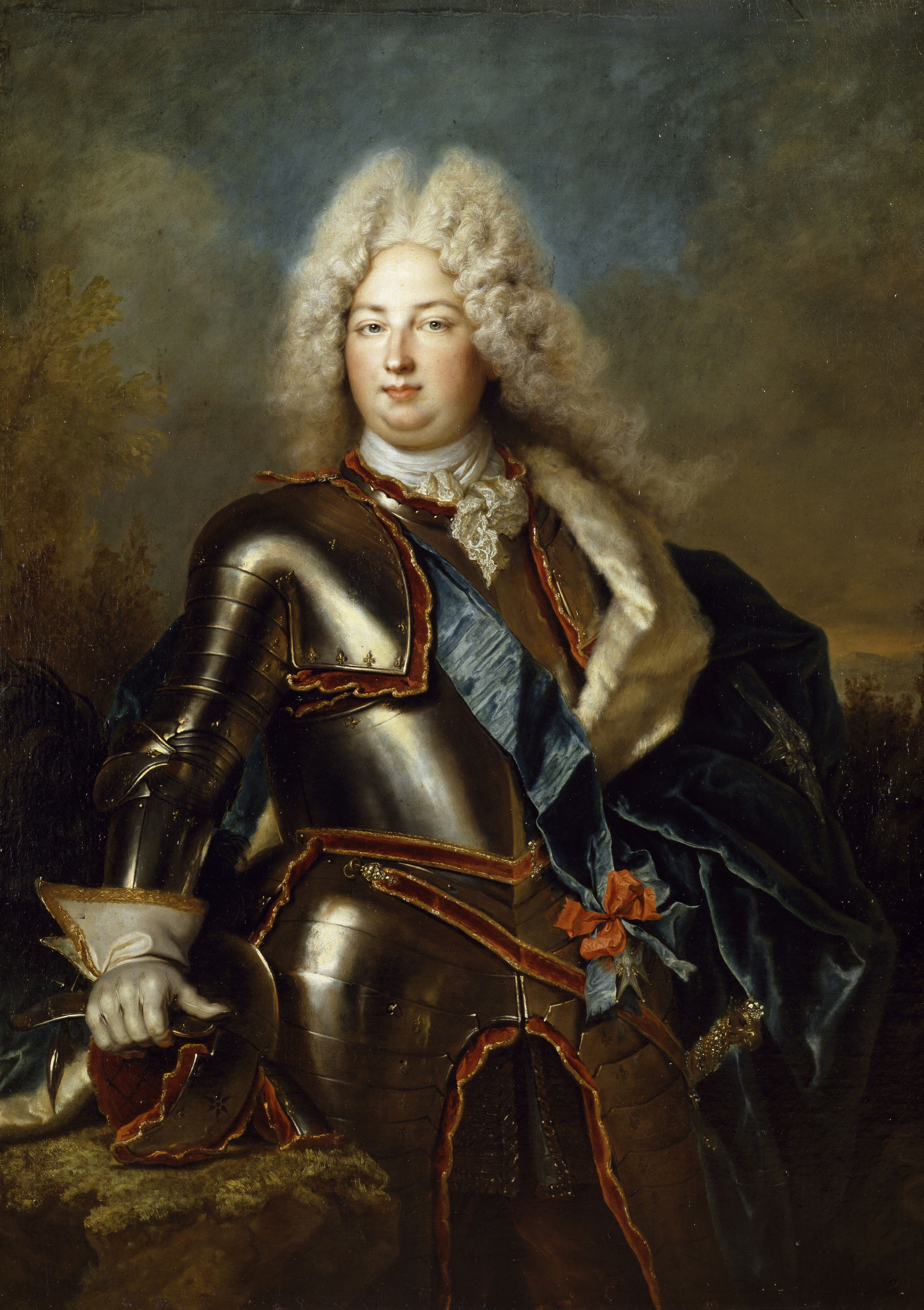
- Portrait by Nicolas de Largillière
- Born: 31 July 1686; Palace of Versailles, France
- Died: 5 May 1714 (aged 27); Palace of Versailles, France
- Burial: 15 May 1714; Basilica of Saint Denis, France
- Spouse: Marie Louise Élisabeth d'Orléans (m. 1710)
- Issue Detail: Charles, Duke of Alençon; Marie Louise Élisabeth
Names
- Charles de France
- House: Bourbon
- Father: Louis, Dauphin of France
- Mother: Marie Anne Victoire of Bavaria
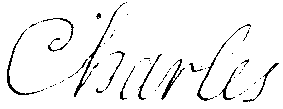
- Signature

Charles of France, Duke of Berry, (31 July 1686 – 5 May 1714) was a grandson of Louis XIV of France. Although he was only a grandson of Louis XIV, Berry held the rank of fils de France ("son of France"), rather than petit-fils de France ("grandson of France"), as the son of the Dauphin, heir apparent to the throne. The Duke of Berry was for seven years (1700–1707) heir presumptive to the throne of Spain, until his elder brother Philip V of Spain fathered a son in 1707.

== Early life ==
Born at the Palace of Versailles, Charles was the youngest son of Louis, Dauphin of France, "le Grand Dauphin," and of Maria Anna Victoria of Bavaria. He was raised under the supervision of the royal governess Louise de Prie.

One of three children, he was the uncle of the future Louis XV, who was the son of his brother, Louis, Duke of Burgundy. Charles' other brother, Philip, Duke of Anjou, was the future Philip V of Spain. Charles was styled Duke of Berry (duc de Berry) at his birth, but never actually possessed that Duchy. In 1710, he was invested with his apanage, consisting in the duchies of Alençon, of Angoulême, county of Ponthieu and other minor fiefs. Ponthieu was exchanged some month later for other domains. By a special brevet, his grandfather permitted him to keep the title "Duke of Berry", which he held until his death..

As the third son of the Dauphin, Berry was not expected to inherit the throne; and at his father's death in 1711, his oldest brother Louis, Duke of Burgundy became Dauphin.

However, in agreement with the testament of Charles II, king of Spain, the Duke of Berry was heir presumptive to the Spanish throne from November 1700 until 25 August 1707 (birth of his nephew Louis, Prince of Asturias). He renounced all his rights to the Spanish succession on 24 November 1712, in application of the treaties of Utrecht.

== Marriage ==
On account of the prestige of his birth, cadet branches of the royal family saw in him a highly desirable match for their daughters. One of his aunts, Louise-Françoise de Bourbon, princesse de Condé, a legitimised daughter of Louis XIV and Madame de Montespan, proposed her daughter Louise Élisabeth de Bourbon, but the marriage proposal did not materialize, much to the annoyance of the House of Bourbon-Condé.

The Princess de Condé's sister, Françoise-Marie de Bourbon, duchesse d'Orléans, then suggested a union with her eldest daughter, Marie Louise Élisabeth d'Orléans. The marriage with Marie Louise Élisabeth, daughter of Philippe d'Orléans, Duke of Orléans, the future Regent of France, took place on 6 July 1710. A miscarriage ended the first pregnancy of Marie Louise Élisabeth. Two years later, she gave birth to a premature boy who lived just a few weeks. She was again pregnant at the time of her husband's death but miscarried a girl one month, later. The Duchess was notoriously unfaithful to her husband and even thought of running away with her lover La Haye.

Elizabeth Charlotte, Duchess Dowager of Orléans, (known as Madame Palatine or La Palatine), and the grandmother of Berry's wife, nicknamed him "Berry Bon Cœur" ("Berry Good Heart") and later wrote on the marriage between him and her granddaughter:

At first he was passionately fond of his wife; but at the end of three months he fell in love with a little, ugly, femme de chambre. The Duchess, who had sufficient penetration, was not slow in discovering this, and told her husband immediately that, if he continued to live upon good terms with her, as he had done at first, she would say nothing about it, and act as if she were not acquainted with it; but if he behaved ill, she would tell the whole affair to the King, and have the femme de chambre sent away, so that he should never hear of her again. By this threat she held the Duke, who was a very simple man, so completely in check, that he lived very well with her up to his death, leaving her to do as she pleased, and dying himself as fond as ever of the femme de chambre. A year before his death he had her married, but on the condition that the husband should not exercise his marital rights. He left her pregnant as well as his wife, both of whom lay-in after his decease. Madame de Berry, who was not jealous, retained this woman, and took care of her and her child. One month later, the Duchess gave birth prematurely to a girl who died the next day. During the regency of her father, the young widow became known as a Messalina, ill-reputed for the debauched life she led in her Luxembourg Palace. Her health rapidly undermined by gluttony, alcoholism and a series of clandestine pregnancies, Madame de Berry died on 21 July 1719. The autopsy revealed that the princess was again with child although she had almost died at the end of March 1719, when giving birth to a still-born child allegedly fathered by her captain of the guards.

== Death ==
In 1712, Berry's eldest brother, Louis, Duke of Burgundy, Dauphin of France, and the latter's elder son, Louis, Duke of Brittany died. It was foreseeable that Berry would serve as Regent for his brother's only surviving son, Louis, Duke of Anjou. But, on 5 May 1714, he died from internal injuries sustained in a hunting accident.

Family of Charles in 1687

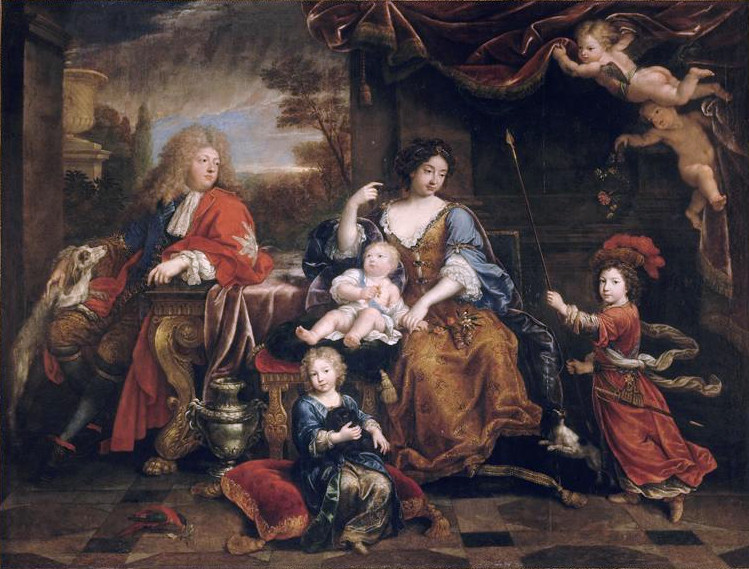
la Famille du Grand Dauphin, or the Family of the Grand Dauphin in 1687; (L-R) Louis, le Grand Dauphin himself; on the floor is Philippe de France, Duke of Anjou and future King of Spain; Maria Anna of Bavaria, la Grande Dauphine with the youngest child, Charles of France, Duke of Berry on her lap; Louis de France, Duke of Burgundy and father of Louis XV plays on the far right with an arrow

== Honours ==
- Knight of the Holy Spirit (at birth)
- Knight of Saint Michael (automatically when received as a knight of the Holy Spirit in 1699)
- Knight of Saint Louis (1693)
- Knight of the Golden Fleece (1701)

=== Arms ===
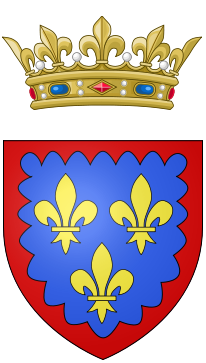
Coat of arms of Charles, Duke of Berry.

The Duke of Berry assumed the royal arms (Azure, three fleur-de-lys or) differenced with a bordure engrailed gules, the mark of cadency traditionally associated with the Duchy of Berry since the 14th century (despite the fact that he never actually received that Duchy as an apanage, but the Duchies of Alençon and Angoulême to which other arms were associated) and with the coronet of a Child of France above the shield.

== Issue ==
The Duke and the Duchess of Berry had three children, none of whom survived infancy. Since Charles was Duke of Berry only in name, they were not known as "de Berry" but as "d'Alençon", taken from his first substantial duchy.

1. Stillborn daughter (Palace of Fontainebleau, 21 July 1711), Mademoiselle de Berry.
2. Charles d'Alençon, Duke of Alençon (Palace of Versailles, 26 March 1713 – 16 April 1713, Palace of Versailles).
3. Marie Louise Élisabeth d'Alençon (posthumously, Palace of Versailles, 16 June 1714 – 17 June 1714, Palace of Versailles).

== Ancestors ==
Ancestors of Charles, Duke of Berry

8. Louis XIII of France
4. Louis XIV of France
9. Anne of Austria
2. Louis, Dauphin of France
10. Philip IV of Spain
5. Maria Theresa of Austria
11. Elisabeth of France
1. Charles of France, Duke of Berry
12. Maximilian I, Elector of Bavaria
6. Ferdinand Maria, Elector of Bavaria
13. Maria Anna of Austria
3. Maria Anna Victoria of Bavaria
14. Victor Amadeus I, Duke of Savoy
7. Henriette Adelaide of Savoy
15. Christine of France

== Notes ==
Media related to Charles, Duke of Berry (1686–1714) at Wikimedia Commons

Charles, Duke of Berry (1686–1714) House of Bourbon Born: 31 July 1686 Died: 5 May 1714
French royalty
Preceded by Vacant; François, Duke of Anjou	Duke of Berry; 1686–1714	Succeeded by Vacant; Louis XVI of France
