= Marie Louise Élisabeth d'Orléans =

Duchess of Berry (1695–1719)

Marie Louise Élisabeth
- Duchess of Berry
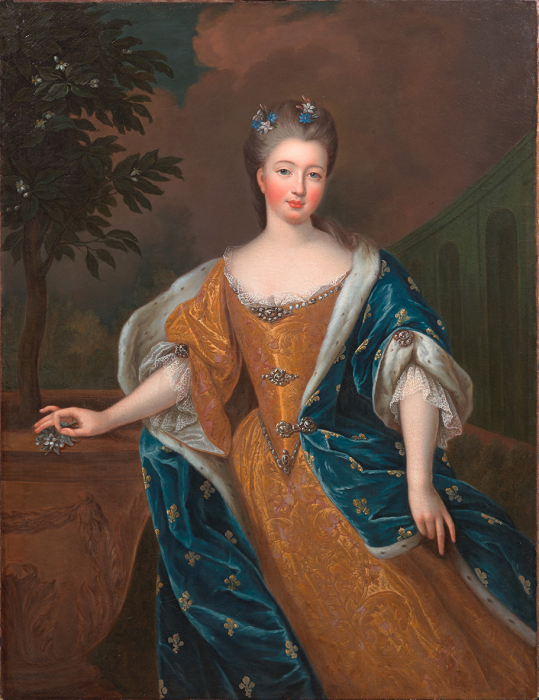
- Portrait by Pierre Gobert, c. 1715
- Born: 20 August 1695; Palace of Versailles, France
- Died: 21 July 1719 (aged 23); Château de La Muette, France
- Burial: 24 July 1719; Basilica of St Denis
- Spouse: Charles, Duke of Berry (m. 1710; died 1714)
- Issue Detail: Charles, Duke of Alençon; Marie Louise Élisabeth
Names
- Marie Louise Élisabeth d'Orléans
- House: Orléans
- Father: Philippe II, Duke of Orléans
- Mother: Françoise Marie de Bourbon

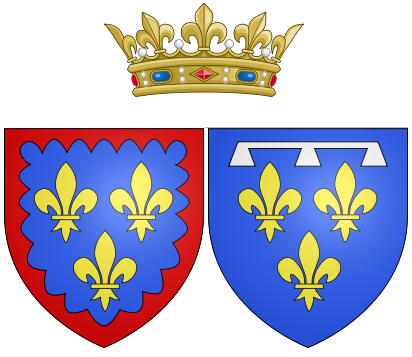
- Coat of arms

Louise Élisabeth, Duchess of Berry (born Marie Louise Élisabeth, Mademoiselle d'Orléans; 20 August 1695 – 21 July 1719) was Duchess of Berry by marriage to the French prince Charles, Duke of Berry. She is known affectionately by the moniker "Joufflotte".

== Life ==
Marie Louise Élisabeth was born at the Palace of Versailles as the eldest surviving child to Philippe II, Duke of Orléans and his wife Françoise Marie de Bourbon, a legitimised daughter of King Louis XIV. She was given the honorary title of Mademoiselle d'Orléans at birth, and was baptised at Saint-Cloud on 29 July 1696.

Known as Louise Élisabeth, she grew up at the Palais-Royal, the Orléans residence in Paris. She recovered from a near fatal illness at the age of six; her father personally nursed her day and night in order to save her life. Her paternal grandmother, Elizabeth Charlotte of the Palatinate, wrote in her memoirs that from a very early age, Louise Élisabeth:

... had entirely her own way, so that it is not surprising she should be like a headstrong horse.

At the age of ten, Louise Élisabeth caught smallpox at Saint-Cloud and her grandmother wrote in her memoirs that Mademoiselle d'Orléans was presumed dead for over six hours.

=== Marriage ===
It was decided, with the help of Marie Adélaïde, Duchess of Burgundy, that Louise Élisabeth would marry Charles, Duke of Berry, the youngest son of the Grand Dauphin. Papal dispensation having arrived on 5 July 1710, the marriage took place 6 July 1710 at the Palace of Versailles. The presiding bishop was the Cardinal de Janson. The King ordered his other Orléans granddaughters, Mademoiselle de Chartres and Mademoiselle de Valois, back from their convent at Chelles.

The position of dame d'honneur was given to Marie Gabrielle de Durfort de Lorges, the wife of the Duke of Saint-Simon, while her first cousin Marie Anne de Bourbon became her lady-in-waiting, a post Marie Anne later resigned because of her cousin's wayward nature. She stated:

I shall pass lightly over an event which, engrafted upon some others, made some noise, notwithstanding the care taken to hush it up. The Duchess of Burgundy supped at Saint-Cloud one evening with the Duchess of Berry and others, Madame de Saint-Simon absenting herself from the party. The Duchess of Berry and the Duke of Orléans, but she more than he, got so drunk that the Duchess of Burgundy, the Duchess of Orléans, and the rest of the company knew not what to do. The Duke of Berry was there, and him they talked over as well as they could, and the numerous company was amused by the Grand Duchess, to the best of her ability. The effect of the wine in more ways than one was such that people were troubled, and, since she could not be sobered, it became necessary to carry her back, drunk as she was, to Versailles. All the servants waiting with the carriages saw the condition she was in, and did not keep it to themselves; nevertheless, they succeeded in concealing it from the King, from Monseigneur, and from Madame de Maintenon.

In July 1711, Louise Élisabeth gave birth to her first child, a stillborn girl, at the Palace of Fontainebleau. The child's death was blamed on the King, who had made her travel with the royal court to Fontainebleau despite the doctors advising her to stay at Versailles or at the Palais Royal due to her advanced pregnancy. The King did not give in and made Louise Élisabeth travel by barge instead of carriage. During this journey, the barge hit a pier of a bridge at Melun and nearly sank. Louise Élisabeth almost lost her life. According to the doctors, the death of the baby was caused by stress of the journey and the accident. The Princess, however, made a quick recovery.

On 26 March 1713, the Duchess of Berry gave birth to a son, who was given the title Duke of Alençon. After several attacks of convulsions, the child died at Versailles on 16 June. His heart was taken to the Val-de-Grâce convent in Paris by the Bishop of Sens, and his body to the Basilica of Saint-Denis. The Duchess ordered that her son's governesses continue receiving their annual salary.

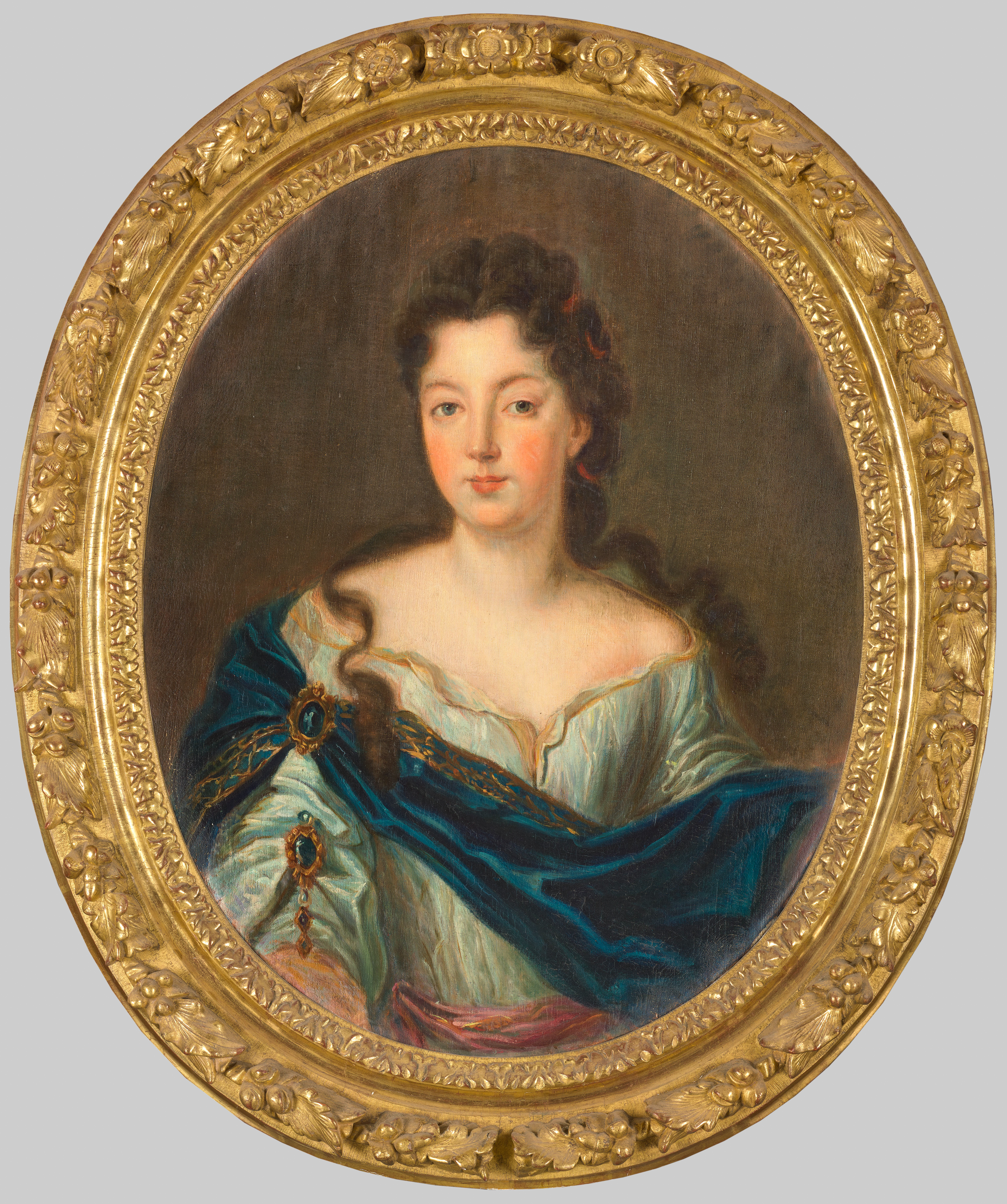
Miniature of the Duchess of Berry, by an unidentified artist (18th century)

In November 1713 it became public that the Duke of Berry had taken as a mistress one of her chambermaids. In return, Louise Élisabeth took a lover, a certain "Monsieur La Haye", who had been preceded by Monsieur de Salvert. When her affair with La Haye became known, her husband threatened to have her sent to a convent. Saint-Simon even records on one occasion that the Duke of Berry kicked her in public because of her indiscretions. During her romance with La Haye, she conceived a plan for the two of them to flee to the Netherlands.

=== Dowager Duchess ===
On 5 May 1714, her husband died from internal injuries sustained in a hunting accident, whereupon Louise Élisabeth became the Dowager Duchess of Berry. On 16 June 1714, seven weeks after the death of her husband, she gave birth to a daughter who died the following day.

In September 1715, Louise Élisabeth was given the Luxembourg Palace as her Parisian residence, where she hosted lavish banquets. The closing of the Luxembourg Garden to the public made her unpopular with the Parisian population.

King Louis XIV had died on 1 September and Louise Élisabeth, officially in mourning, promised she would not attend any shows for six months, but she soon openly turned into a "merry widow". On 23 September 1715, she established her residence in the Luxembourg Palace and obtained from her father a whole company of guards. Despite the mourning, the Duchess of Berry allowed gambling in her new palace, in particular the Lansquenet game. She even entertained herself in public. Dangeau noted in his diary dated Saturday, 4 January 1716: "There was ball in the evening in the hall of the Opera, the Duchess of Berry and many other princesses were there masked." Radiantly beautiful, the Duchess paraded in a splendid dress at this carnival ball that her father had just installed at the Opera.

Three weeks later, Louise Élisabeth shut herself up in the Luxembourg Palace, officially "bothered with a bad cold". The Duchess had been hiding her pregnancy until she reached her term in which she would be suffering the pains of labour. This clandestine confinement is reported in the Gazette de la Régence on 6 February 1716: "They say the Duchess of Berry gave birth to a daughter who lived only three days. This conduct reminds of Messalina and of Queen Margot". This secret childbirth soon became public knowledge and excited the verve of satirists. A song dated 1716 ("Les couches de la Duchesse de Berry") and later satirical verses from the Collection Clairambault-Maurepas lampoon the unbridled lust of the young widow, poking fun at her "countless" lovers and her pregnancies.

During the Regency, Louise Élisabeth was given an annual income of 600,000 livres. In addition to the Orléans residences, she was also given the use of the Château de Meudon after giving back to the Crown the Château d'Amboise, which had been the official country residence of the Duke of Berry. On 21 May 1717, the Duchess received a visit at the Luxembourg from Peter the Great, Tsar of Russia, on a semi-official visit to France. In March 1718 she nursed her mother who was ill.

According to the Gazette de la Régence, when the Duchess of Berry received the Russian emperor at the Luxembourg, she appeared at the reception "stout as a tower" ("puisssante comme une tour"), a rare idiom implying she was big with a child. It is then during May 1717 that Voltaire got arrested after saying to a police informer that the daughter of the Regent was a whore, adding that she had retired for six months at La Muette to give birth. Dangeau's diary confirms that the Duchess spent most of spring and summer in 1717 at her Château de la Muette. The Gazette de la Régence mentions that her prolonged stay there and also the fact she had given up hunting and horse-riding had given rise to salacious gossip. The Gazette de la Régence states that in early July, the Duchess, who by then kept secluded in La Muette, was being "inconvenienced", "having grown so big" ("puissante") that it was feared for her life! The "Gazette" reports by the end of July that Madame de Berry was rumored to be in critical condition as she was finally delivered of this new fruit of her amours. As in 1716, this clandestine birth was an open secret and satirical songwriters mocked the loose morality of the princess who always armed with a large c..k, gets f....d from both front and behind. In a Christmas satirical song of 1717, the whole court of France, renders homage to the Holy Child in Bethlehem, led by the Regent and his very pregnant daughter :

Very big with child
The fruitful Berry
Said in a humble posture
Very sorry at heart :
Lord, I will no longer have such lusty ways
I only want Rions,
Sometimes my dad,
Here and there, my guards.

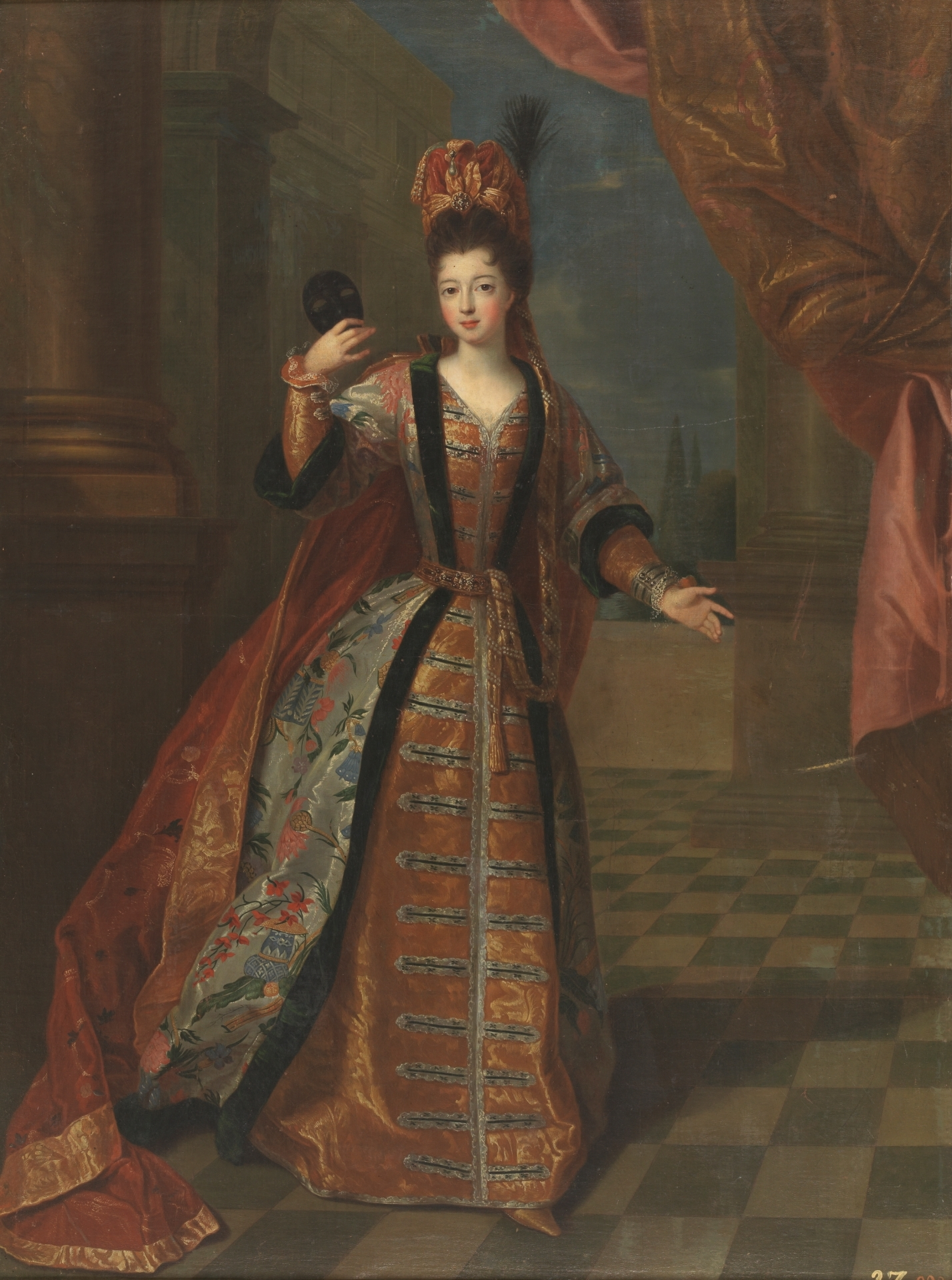
Presumed portrait of the Duchess of Berry (by Pierre Gobert, 1714)

In the spring of 1718, it seems likely that the "fecund Berry" was again with a child. The anonymous author of the letters sent from Paris to Holland, and was also collected in the Gazette de la Régence, mentions on 9 May 1718 that the Duchess of Berry will remain in La Muette until All Saints Day, and has been bled over the past days because of "a certain condition" she was in. The Princess was presumably 3–4 months pregnant. At the time, bloodletting was commonly performed at various stages of pregnancy and also at childbirth. Soon after, the Duchess of Berry miscarried. She conceived again in July. This new pregnancy, which soon became public gossip, would prove fatal to her.

Voltaire had been sent to the Bastille in May 1717 after suggesting in presence of a police informer that the Duchess of Berry was expecting a child conceived by her own father. During his imprisonment, Voltaire completed his play Oedipus which premièred on 18 November 1718 at the Comédie-Française. The Régent was present at the premiere and congratulated Voltaire for his success. The Duchess of Berry's clandestine pregnancies were often attributed to her alleged incestuous relationships with the Regent. These malicious rumors had made Voltaire's play controversial long before it was performed. Ironically, the Duchess of Berry was also present at the premiere. She entered the theater in royal style, escorted by the ladies of her court and her personal guard. The young Princess was rumored to be expecting again and her condition, which she could not fully conceal, inspired the satirists' malicious comments that spectators would not only see Oedipus (the Regent) and Jocaste (Berry) but also detect the presence of Eteocles. The appearance at the premiere of the infamous Duchess, visibly enceinte, thus contributed to the public success of the play. On 11 February 1719, the Duchess of Berry attended another performance of Oedipus played for her nephew Louis XV at the Louvre. Wearing a splendidly embroidered robe à la Française, the Princess sat next to the infant king. As with her previous pregnancies, she had put on enormous weight during gestation and her loose fitting gown failed to hide her advanced condition. The room was very crowded and hot; the Duchess of Berry felt unwell and fainted when some allusion made in the play to Jocasta's incestuous pregnancy was loudly applauded by the public. She thus was seen to have paid the price for her open flouting of public morality and outraging the public sense of decency by displaying her illegitimate pregnancy. The incident instantly awakened the jubilation of scandalmongers who expected the Duchess of Berry (Jocasta) to go into labor and give birth to Eteocles in the middle of the performance. But a window was opened and the Duchess recovered from her swoon, thus frustrating the public taste for oedipian scandals.

Nearing her term, the Duchess of Berry still played a lead role in the "little suppers" of the Regent. On 2 April 1719, upon four days of gruesome labor, she delivered a baby girl. According to Saint-Simon the father was her lieutenant of the guards, Sicaire Antonin Armand Auguste Nicolas d'Aydie, the Chevalier de Rion. The Princess nearly died during childbirth, hidden in a small room of her Luxembourg palace. The curé of Saint-Sulpice Paris church, Jean-Baptiste Languet de Gergy refused to give her the absolution or to let anyone else administer her the sacraments unless she would expel her paramour from the palace. The Regent tried in vain convincing the irate cure to attend his suffering daughter. But the "illustrious sinner" put an end to Languet's vigil by finally giving birth. According to Saint-Simon, the Duchess of Berry secretly married Rion a few days later hoping thereby to lessen the public scandal caused by her confinement and the refusal of the church to administer her the sacraments. The means adopted by the Princess to conceal her delivery ended in her death. Her health fatally undermined by her harrowing lying-in, she left Paris for her Château de Meudon where she gave a reception in honour of her father who did not approve of her marriage to Rion and had sent him away from Paris. She had not recovered from her horrendous childbirth and this evening reception at which she caught a chill severely affected her health.

The Duchess then took up residence at the Château de la Muette, where she died on 21 July 1719, at the age of twenty-three. According to Saint-Simon, the autopsy revealed that "the poor princess" had in her womb a new fetus with several weeks of gestation. On Saturday 22 July 1719, her heart was taken to the Val-de-Grâce church in Paris, and on 24 July 1719, she was buried in the Basilica of Saint-Denis. Her funeral arrangements were made by Saint-Simon himself.

=== Final moments and legacy ===
Concerning her last visit to her granddaughter, Madame wrote:

28th May, 1719. I went to see her last Sunday, the 23rd May, and found her in a sad state, suffering from pains in her toes and the soles of her feet until the tears came into her eyes. I went away because I saw that she refrained from crying out on my account. I thought she was in a bad way. A consultation was held by her three physicians, the result of which was that they determined to bleed her in the feet. They had some difficulty in persuading her to submit to it, because the pain in her feet was so great that she uttered the most piercing screams if the bedclothes only rubbed against them. The bleeding, however, succeeded, and she was in some degree relieved. It was the gout in both feet

During her lifetime, Louise Élisabeth gained a reputation for scandal. In an irony of history, the next Duchesse de Berry, Princess Caroline Ferdinande, was also known for her scandalous behaviour.

== Issue ==
The Duke and the Duchess of Berry had three children who never reached one month of age:

- Daughter* (21 July 1711 – 23 July 1711); Mademoiselle de Berry.
- Charles, Duke of Alençon (26 March 1713 – 16 April 1713).
- Marie Louise Élisabeth (16 June 1714 – 17 June 1714).

It is known that the young Duchess had several lovers while her husband was alive, so the real fatherhood of her first three unhappy maternities is open to debate. Having become a widow, the Duchess secretly brought forth three children of uncertain parentage:

- Daughter* (27/28 January 1716); this child of an unknown father only lived 3 days.
- Daughter* (July 1717); the Duchess had retired at the Château de la Muette to hide the term of her pregnancy. The putative father Sicaire Antonin Armand Auguste Nicolas d'Aydie, Chevalier de Rion, became the Duchess's lover sometime in 1716 or 1717. In his additions to the diary of Dangeau on 21 July 1719, Saint-Simon mentions that the Duchess had managed to hide a first pregnancy by Rion, bringing forth a girl. She was not so fortunate the second time when she almost died in labour at the Luxembourg and provoked a public scandal. This was underscored by Saint-Simon, who then wrote a short description of the Duchess's 1719 childbirth which has become the most-well known episode of her scandalous biography. According to Duclos, this child subsequently became a nun at the Abbey of Pontoise.
- Stillborn daughter* (2 April 1719); her father was probably the Chevalier de Rion, also.

== Ancestors ==
Ancestors of Marie Louise Élisabeth d'Orléans

8. Louis XIII of France
4. Philippe I, Duke of Orléans
9. Anne of Austria
2. Philippe II, Duke of Orléans
10. Charles I Louis, Elector Palatine
5. Elizabeth Charlotte of the Palatinate
11. Charlotte of Hesse-Kassel
1. Marie Louise Élisabeth d'Orléans
12. Louis XIII of France (= 8)
6. Louis XIV of France
13. Anne of Austria (= 9)
3. Françoise Marie de Bourbon
14. Gabriel de Rochechouart, Duke of Mortemart
7. Madame de Montespan
15. Diane de Grandseigne
