= Louise Diane d'Orléans =

Princess of Conti (1716–1736)

- Princess of Conti
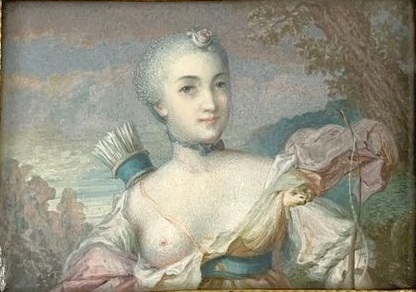
- Born: 27 June 1716; Palais-Royal, Paris, Kingdom of France
- Died: 26 September 1736 (aged 20); Château d'Issy, Kingdom of France
- Burial: 30 September 1736; Saint-André-des-Arcs, Paris, Kingdom of France
- Spouse: Louis François, Prince of Conti (m. 1732)
- Issue Detail: Louis François Joseph, Prince of Conti
- House: Orléans
- Father: Philippe II, Duke of Orléans
- Mother: Françoise Marie de Bourbon

Louise Diane d'Orléans (27 June 1716 – 26 September 1736) was Princess of Conti from her marriage to Prince Louis François in 1732, until her death in childbirth. She was the youngest child of Philippe II, Duke of Orléans and Françoise Marie de Bourbon, the youngest legitimised daughter of King Louis XIV of France and his mistress Madame de Montespan. She was born while her father was the regent for Louis XV. Some sources referred to her as Louis Diane.

== Biography ==
Louise Diane d'Orléans was born in the Palais-Royal, the Paris residence of the House of Orléans, on 27 June 1716 as the youngest child of the Philippe II, Duke of Orléans and Françoise Marie de Bourbon.

Louise's birth and her gender was seen as a disappointment and caused her paternal grandmother to lament that "It is unfortunate that all of my son's bastards are boys and his legitimate children are girls."

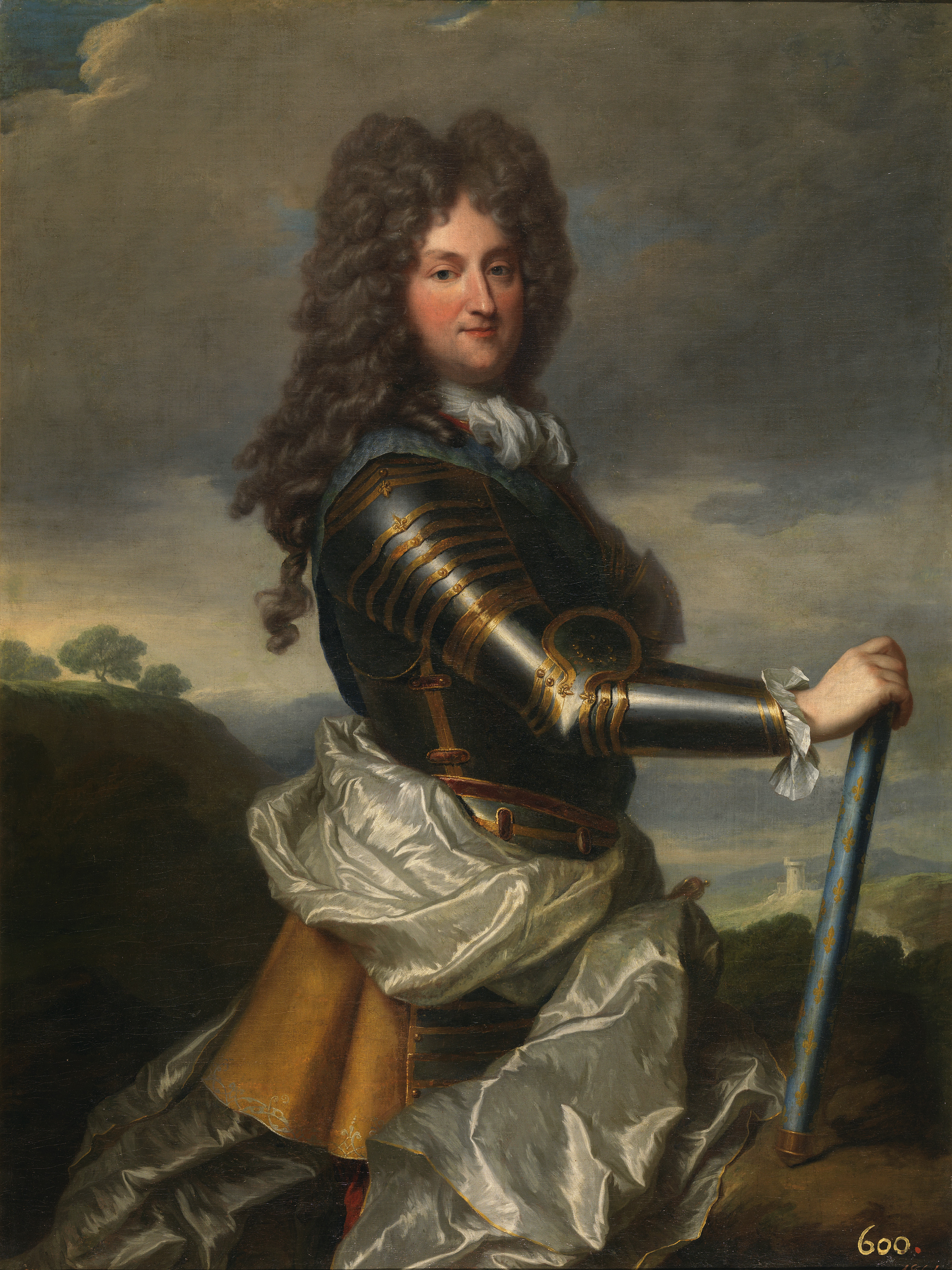
Jean Baptiste Santerre (Museo del Prado)

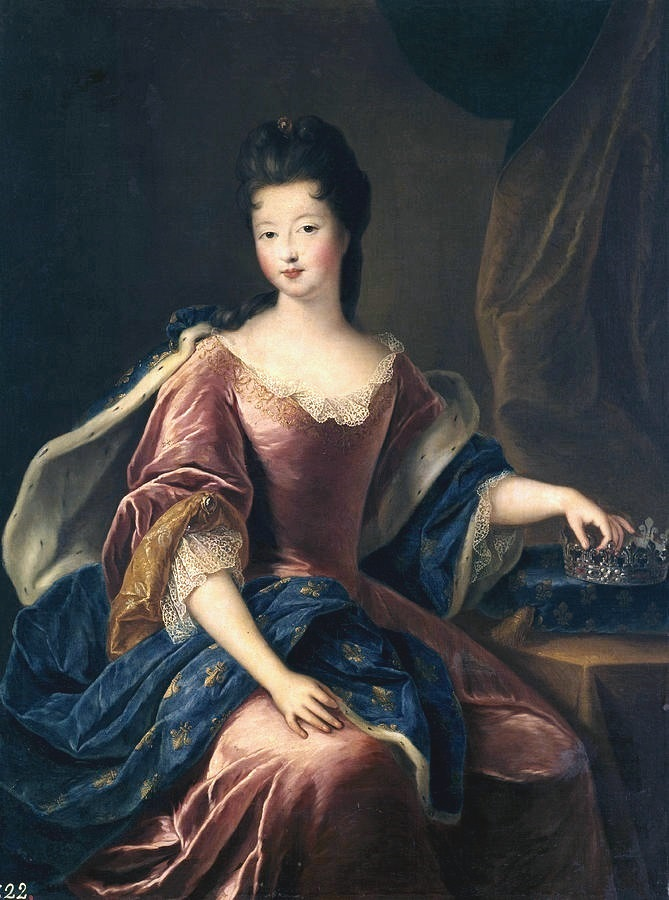
Françoise Marie de Bourbon by Pierre Gobert

Louise's parents relationship was not a harmonious one, with her father nicknaming her mother "Madame Lucifer" because of her haughty manner. They lived mostly separate lives, with the duchess living at the Palais-Royal with their children, while the duke lived at the Petit Palais while pursuing a dissipated life and openly flaunting his mistresses in front of his wife. Despite their marital discord they would go on have eight children.

Louise received her early education from the same governess as her aunt Élisabeth Charlotte d'Orléans, but due to their unruliness and their mother, the duchess's, laxness in supporting the governess and disciplining her children, it seems Louise and her sisters' education was severely neglected. Eventually, the sisters would be sent to the Convent of the Visitandines to receive education from the nuns there.

Louise's personality was described by her contemporaries very sensitive, and she was considered to be of the most beautiful daughters of the regent.

Until her marriage, Louise was known as Mademoiselle de Chartres. The style of Mademoiselle de Chartres had been used by her elder sister Adélaïde, who, by the time of Louise Diane's birth, was a nun at Chelles. Her aunt Élisabeth Charlotte d'Orléans also used the title.

Louise grew up in an era when her father, known as Philippe d'Orléans, or simply le Régent, was the de facto ruler of France, as he had been in charge of the affairs of the state since the death of Louise's maternal grandfather King Louis XIV. The Palais-Royal was where the régent held his court and lived openly with his mistress Marie Thérèse de Parabère. Her mother later acquired the Château de Bagnolet, where she lived quietly and without scandal.

As a member of the reigning House of Bourbon, she was a princesse du sang. As her mother, by then the Duchess of Orléans, was illegitimate by birth, Louise, like her siblings, was not a petite-fille de France.

In her youth, she was said to have been a very sensitive child and would grow up to be one of the more beautiful of the regent's daughters. As she was another girl (1 of 7 overall), her birth was not necessarily greeted with the joy that had met that of her brother, Louis, Duke of Orléans. Upon the death of her father in 1723, at Versailles, at the age of forty-nine, her only brother inherited the title of Duke of Orléans and, in 1724, he married Margravine Johanna of Baden-Baden.

== Marriage ==
In December 1731, it was decided that she should marry her cousin Louis François de Bourbon, Prince of Conti. Her marriage was arranged by her mother Françoise Marie and her first cousin (and subsequent mother-in-law) Louise Élisabeth, Dowager Princess of Conti.

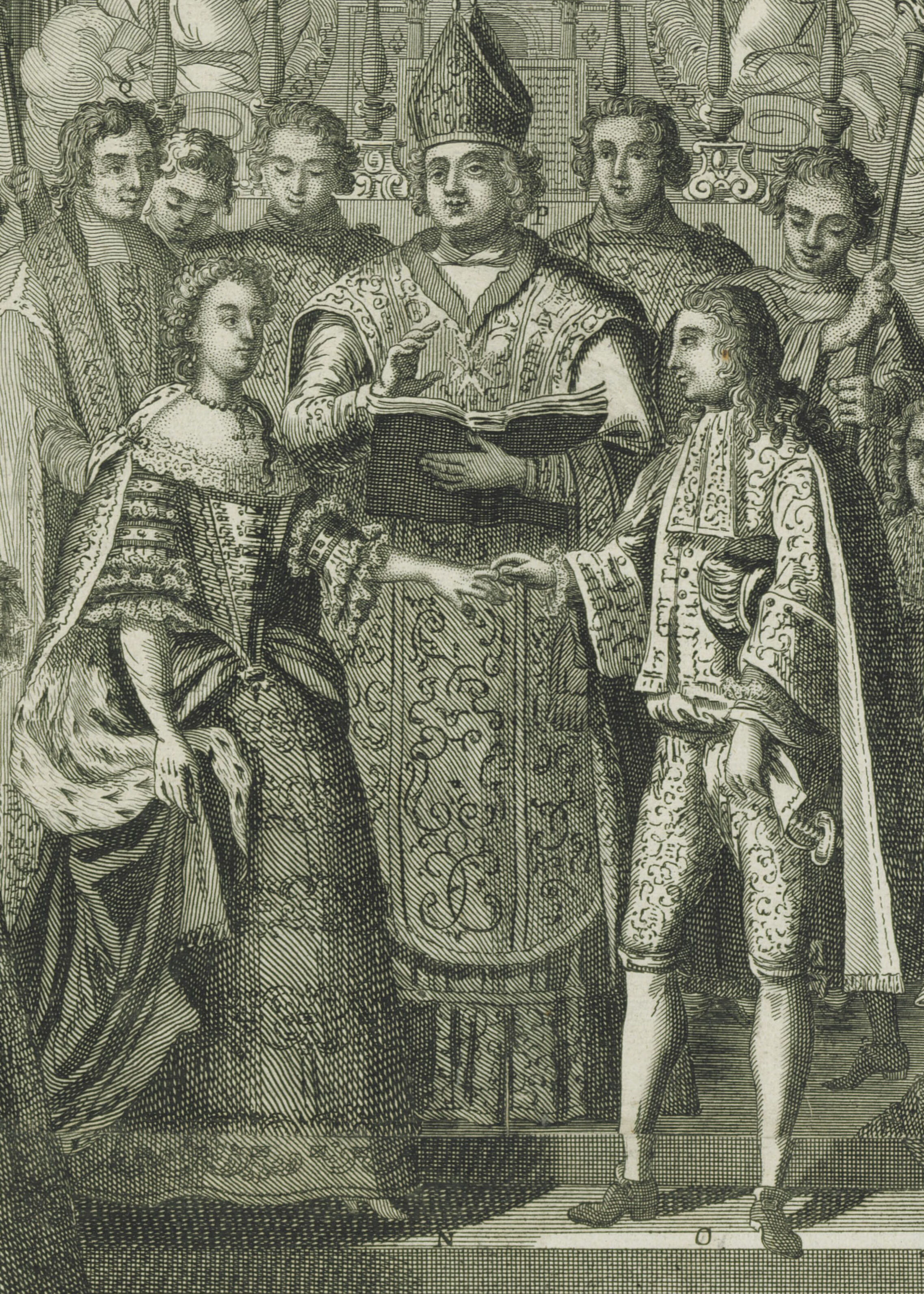
Marriage of the Prince of Conti and Mademoiselle de Chartres in the Chapel of Versailles (1732)

After being baptised on 19 January 1732 by the Cardinal of Rohan (then the Grand Almoner of France), she married the Prince of Conti three days later, on 22 January. The marriage ceremony took place at the Palace of Versailles. Louise was then fifteen years old. At her wedding, her Condé cousin, Élisabeth Alexandrine de Bourbon, had the honour of holding her train.

After the marriage, she became known at court as Her Serene Highness, the Princess of Conti. Her husband had succeeded to the Conti title in 1727 upon the death of his father Louis Armand II, Prince of Conti. In 1734, Louise gave birth to a son, heir to the Conti name, and, in 1736, to a second child who died at birth.

== Death ==
Louise died in childbirth on 26 September 1736 at Issy, outside Paris. She was buried at the Saint-André-des-Arcs church. At her death, due to the Queen Marie Leszczyńska being otherwise engaged, the queen sent Louise's cousin Marie Anne de Bourbon (Mademoiselle de Clermont) to represent her at Issy. According to tradition the heart of the young princess was removed and interred in the church of Val-de-Grace.

Her only surviving son, Louis François Joseph, was the last Prince of Conti.

== Issue ==
- Louis François Joseph de Bourbon, Prince of Conti (1 September 1734 - 13 March 1814); married his first cousin, Princess Maria Fortunata of Modena, and had no legitimate issue.
- Stillborn son* (26 September 1736).

== Sources ==
- Bryant, Mark (2004). "Mme de Maintenon: Partner, Matriarch, and Minister". In Orr, Clarissa Campbell (ed.). Queenship in Europe 1660-1815: The Role of the Consort. Cambridge University Press.
- Lever, Evelyne (2002). Madame de Pompadour: A Life. Translated by Temerson, Catherine. St. Martin's.
- Powell, Lawrence N. (2012). The Accidental City. Harvard University Press.
