= Princess of Conti =

The title of Princess of Conti was a French noble title, held by the wife of the Prince of Conti between 1582 and 1803 with an intermission between 1614 and 1654.

== Princesses of Conti ==
=== First Creation ===
Picture	Name	Father	Birth	Marriage	Became Princess	Ceased to be Princess	Death	Husband
	Jeanne-Françoise de Coeme, Lady of Lucé and Bonnétable	Louis de Coesme, Seigneur of Lucé (Coesme)	1560	1582		27 December 1601		François I
	Louise Marguerite of Guise	Henry I de Lorraine, Duke of Guise (Guise)	1588	24 July/1 May 1605		3 August 1614 husband's death	30 April 1631	François I

=== Second Creation ===
Picture	Name	Father	Birth	Marriage	Became Princess	Ceased to be Princess	Death	Husband
	Anne Marie Martinozzi	Girolamo Martinozzi (Martinozzi)	1637	22 February 1654		21 February 1666 husband's death	4 February 1672	Armand I
	Marie Anne de Bourbon, Légitimée de France	Louis XIV (Bourbon)	2 October 1666	16 January 1680		9 November 1685 husband's death	3 May 1739	Louis Armand I
	Marie Thérèse de Bourbon	Henri Jules de Bourbon, Prince of Condé (Bourbon)	1 February 1666	22 January 1688		22 February 1709 husband's death	22 February 1732	François Louis
	Louise Élisabeth de Bourbon	Louis III de Bourbon, Prince of Condé (Bourbon)	22 November 1693	9 July 1713		4 May 1727 husband's death	27 May 1775	Louis Armand II
	Louise Diane d'Orléans	Philippe d'Orléans (Orléans)	27 June 1716	21 January 1732		26 September 1736		Louis François
	Princess Maria Fortunata of Modena	Francesco III d'Este, Duke of Modena (Este)	24 November 1731	27 February 1759	2 August 1776 husband's accession	21 September 1803		Louis François Joseph
