= Louis Armand de Bourbon, prince de Conti =

Louis Armand de Bourbon, prince de Conti may refer to:

- Louis Armand I, Prince of Conti (1661–1685)
- Louis Armand II, Prince of Conti (1695–1727), his nephew
