= Marie Anne de Bourbon (1689–1720) =

Princess of Condé (1689–1720)

- Princess of Condé; Duchess of Bourbon
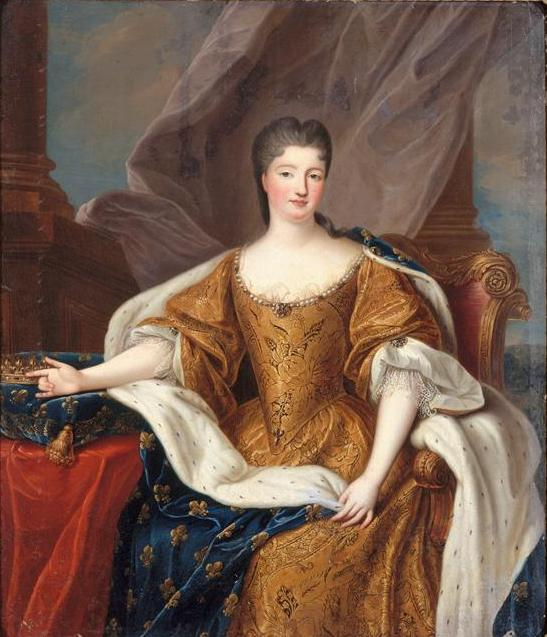
- Portrait by Pierre Gobert
- Born: 18 April 1689; Palace of Versailles, France
- Died: 21 March 1720 (aged 30); Hôtel de Condé, Paris, France
- Burial: Carmel du faubourg Saint-Jacques, Paris, France
- Spouse: Louis Henri, Duke of Bourbon (m. 1713)
- House: Bourbon-Conti
- Father: François Louis, Prince of Conti
- Mother: Marie Thérèse de Bourbon

Marie Anne de Bourbon, Duchess of Bourbon (French pronunciation: [maʁi an də buʁbɔ̃]; 18 April 1689 – 21 March 1720) was a princess of the blood at the French court of Versailles. She was the first wife of Louis Henri, Duke of Bourbon. She died childless during the Regency of Philippe II, Duke of Orléans, who was her husband's uncle. Marie Anne was referred to as "the younger duchess" to distinguish her from her mother-in-law, Louise-Françoise de Bourbon. Despite her husband being the Prince of Condé, he preferred to use the title of Duke of Bourbon, which his wife was known.

== Biography ==
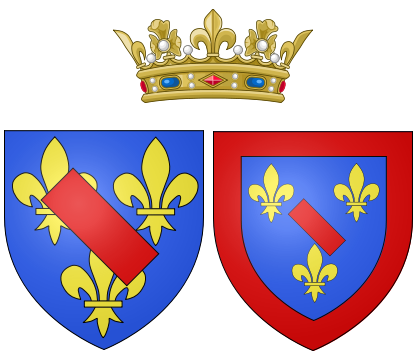
Arms of Marie Anne as Duchess of Bourbon

Marie Anne was the eldest daughter of Marie Thérèse de Bourbon and her promiscuous spouse, François Louis, Prince of Conti. Her father did not return his wife's affections; instead, he lived as a libertine, engaging in numerous love affairs with members of both sexes. His sex life caused tension and distance within the family and earned him the nickname of le Grand Conti. Marie Anne was born a Princess of the Blood at the Palace of Versailles. From her birth until her marriage at the age of 24, she was referred to as Mademoiselle de Conti, derived from her father's title. She was the eldest of seven children, although only she and two others survived into adulthood: her younger brother, Louis Armand, who succeeded his father as Prince of Conti in 1709, and her younger sister, Mademoiselle de La Roche-sur-Yon, who died childless, having outlived them all. Marie Anne was considered more attractive than her sister. She reconciled with her mother after her father died in 1709.

She was close to her maternal grandmother, Anne Henriette of Bavaria. According to the Duchess of Orléans, born Elisabeth Charlotte of the Palatinate, Madame, Marie Anne was responsible for her marriage to the Duke of Bourbon as it was she who wanted to prevent her Orléans cousin Marie Louise Élisabeth d'Orléans from marrying the First Prince of the Blood, the most senior male at court after the immediate royal family. In 1713, at the age of 24, she married her maternal cousin, Louis Henri, Duke of Bourbon, and Prince of Condé, who had been the Duke since his father's death in 1710. He was commonly known as Monsieur le Duc. She and her brother married two Condé siblings in a joint wedding ceremony at Versailles on 9 August. Her brother married Louise Élisabeth de Bourbon. After her marriage, Marie Anne took on the style of Her Serene Highness (Son Altesse sérénissime) Madame la duchesse de Bourbon.

Her husband was the eldest son of Louise Françoise de Bourbon - the eldest illegitimate daughter of Louis XIV and Madame de Montespan, and an old lover of Marie Anne's father. In fact, Louis Henri's younger sister, also named Marie Anne de Bourbon, was rumored to be an illegitimate daughter of Marie Anne's father, le Grand Conti.

The new couple, despite being married for seven years, never had any children. During her marriage, she had an affair with one Chevalier du Challar. Marie Anne died in Paris in 1720 at the age of 30.

Madame said of her;

The Duke's wife is not an ill-looking person: she has good eyes, and would be very well if she had not a, habit of stretching and poking out her neck. Her shape is horrible; she is quite crooked; her back is curved into the form of an S. I observed her one day, through curiosity, when the Dauphine was helping her to dress.

She is a wicked devil, treacherous in every way, and of a very dangerous temper. Upon the whole, she is not good for much. Her falsehood was the means of preventing the Duke from marrying one of my granddaughters. Being the intimate friend of Madame de Berri, who was very desirous that one of her sisters should marry the Duke and the other the Prince of Conti, she promised to bring about the marriage, provided Madame de Berry would say nothing of it to the King or me. After having imposed this condition, she told the King that Madame de Berry and my son were planning a marriage without his sanction; to punish them, she begged the King to marry the Duke to her, which was done.

Thanks to her good sense, she lives upon tolerable terms with her husband, although he has not much affection for her. They follow each their inclinations; they are not at all jealous of each other, and it is said they have separate beds.

She causes a great many troubles and embarrassments to her relation, the young Princess of Conti, and perfectly understands tormenting folks.

After her death, her husband remarried in 1728 to a young German princess, Princess Caroline of Hesse-Rotenburg, sister of the Queen of Sardinia. Later, when she died, the Duchess of Orléans wrote:

The young Duchess died yesterday evening (21st March, 1720). The Duke's joy at the death of his wife will be greatly diminished when he learns that she has bequeathed to her sister, Mademoiselle de La Roche-sur-Yon, all her property; and as the husband and wife lived according to the custom of Paris, 'en communaute', the Duke will be obliged to refund the half of all he gained by Law's bank.

She was buried at the Convent of the Carmel du faubourg Saint-Jacques, Paris.

== Ancestry ==
Ancestors of Marie Anne de Bourbon

16. Henri I, Prince of Condé
8. Henri II, Prince of Condé
17. Charlotte Catherine de La Trémoille
4. Armand, Prince of Conti
18. Henri I, duc de Montmorency
9. Charlotte Marguerite de Montmorency
19. Louise de Budos
2. François Louis, Prince of Conti
20. Vincenzo Martinozzi
10. Girolamo Martinozzi
21. Margherita Marcolini
5. Anne Marie Martinozzi
22. Pietro Mazzarini
11. Laura Margherita Mazzarini
23. Ortensia Bufalini
1. Marie Anne de Bourbon
24. Henri II, Prince of Condé (= 8)
12. Louis II, Prince of Condé
25. Charlotte Marguerite de Montmorency (= 9)
6. Henri Jules, Prince of Condé
26. Urbain de Maillé, 1st Marquis de Brézé
13. Claire Clémence de Maillé
27. Nicole du Plessis de Richelieu
3. Marie Thérèse de Bourbon
28. Frederick V of the Palatinate
14. Edward, Count Palatine of Simmern
29. Elizabeth Stuart
7. Anne Henriette of Bavaria
30. Charles I Gonzaga, Duke of Mantua and Montferrat
15. Anna Gonzaga
31. Catherine of Lorraine
