= Louise Adélaïde de Bourbon =

Louise Adélaïde de Bourbon may refer to:

- Louise Adélaïde de Bourbon (1696–1750) (1696–1750) known as Mademoiselle de La Roche-sur-Yon; daughter of François Louis, Prince of Conti and Marie Thérèse de Bourbon
- Louise Adélaïde de Bourbon (1757–1824) (1757–1824) known as Mademoiselle de Condé; daughter of Louis Joseph de Bourbon, Prince of Condé and Charlotte Godefried de Rohan; Abbess of Remiremont
