= Louis François, Prince of Conti =

Louis François I
- Prince of Conti
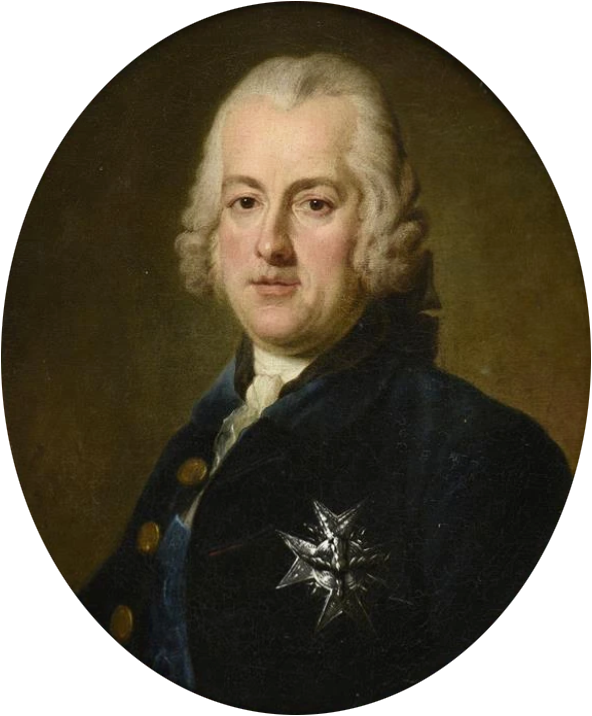

Prince of Conti
- Reign: 4 May 1727 – 2 August 1776
- Predecessor: François Louis
- Successor: Louis François II
- Born: 13 August 1717; Paris, Kingdom of France
- Died: 2 August 1776 (aged 58); Paris, France
- Spouse: Louise Diane d'Orléans (m. 1732; died 1736)
- Issue: Louis François II, Prince of Conti
Names
- Louis François de Bourbon
- House: Bourbon-Conti
- Father: Louis Armand II, Prince of Conti
- Mother: Louise Élisabeth de Bourbon
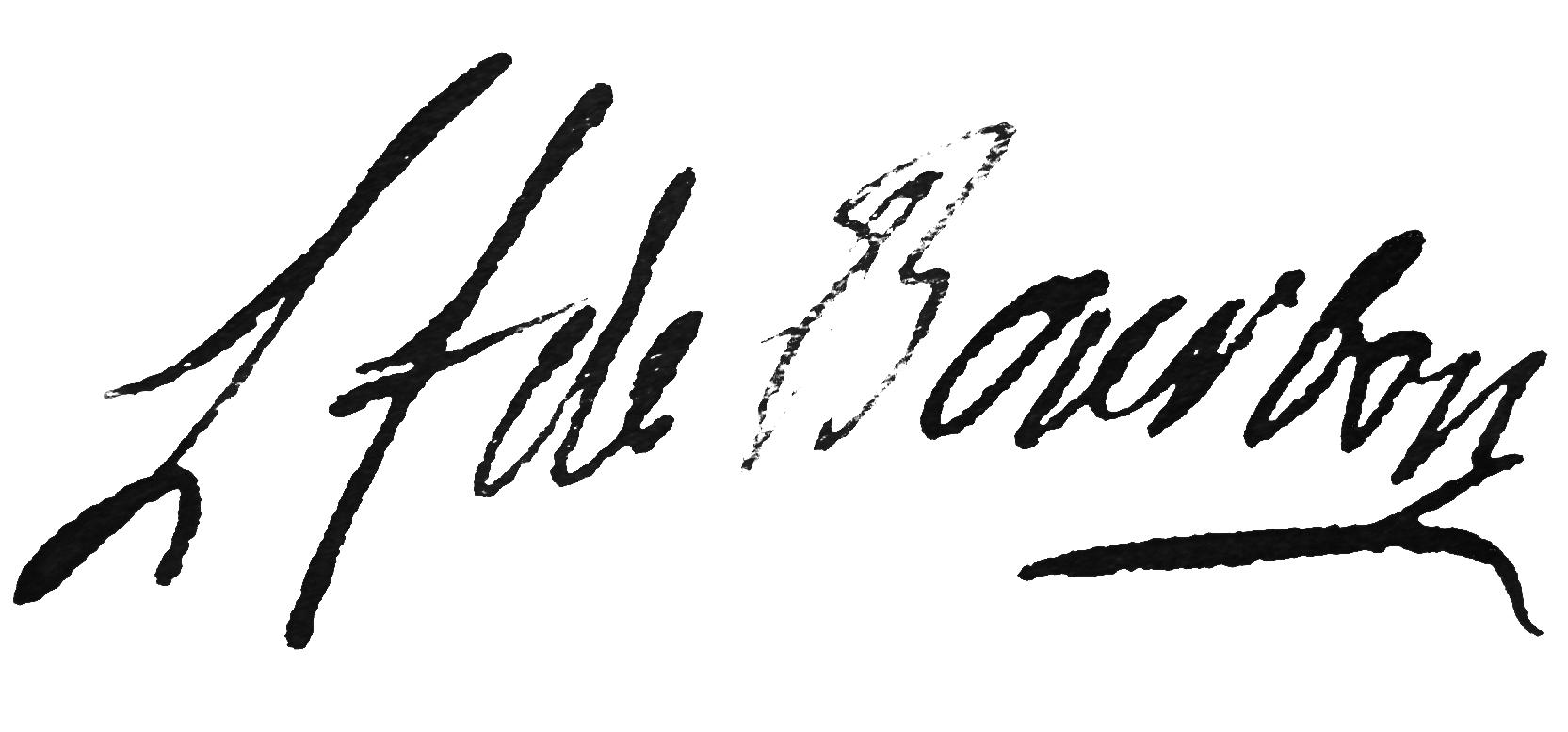
- Signature

Louis François de Bourbon, or Louis François I, Prince of Conti (13 August 1717 – 2 August 1776), was a French nobleman who became the Prince of Conti from 1727 to his death, succeeding his father, Louis Armand II de Bourbon. His mother was Louise Élisabeth de Bourbon, the daughter of Louis III, Prince of Condé and Louise Françoise de Bourbon, a legitimised daughter of King Louis XIV. His younger sister, Louise Henriette de Bourbon, was the mother of Philippe Égalité. As a member of the reigning House of Bourbon, he was a Prince du Sang.

== Biography ==
Louis François I de Bourbon was born in Paris.

In 1731, he married Louise Diane d'Orléans, Mademoiselle de Chartres (the first cousin of his mother Louise Élisabeth, through her mother), who was the youngest daughter of Philippe II, Duke of Orléans (the Régent of France during the minority of King Louis XV) and his wife, Françoise-Marie de Bourbon, the daughter of King Louis XIV and Madame de Montespan.

His mother, the Dowager Princess of Conti, and future mother-in-law, the Dowager Duchess of Orléans, organized his marriage. However, the short marriage ended when Louis François's wife died giving birth to a stillborn child at the Château d'Issy in 1736. He then stayed at the Château de L'Isle-Adam near Paris. In 1740, he proposed a marriage with the king's second daughter, Henriette of France (1727–1752), to the king, who turned down Louis François' request.

=== Military career ===
Louis François also pursued a military career and he accompanied the Duke of Belle-Isle to Bohemia when the War of the Austrian Succession broke out in 1741. His services there led to his command of the army in Italy, where he distinguished himself by forcing the pass of Villafranca and winning the battle of Coni in 1744.

In 1745, he was sent to check the Austrians in Germany. In 1746, he was transferred to the Netherlands and led the successful siege of Mons, but conflicts with the Maréchal de Saxe led to his retirement in 1747 to the Château de L'Isle-Adam.

In 1760, he bought a famous Burgundy vineyard, which then bore the name of La Romanée, at a high price. After the purchase, he added his own name to the vineyard and it has been known as Romanée-Conti since then. This vineyard produces some of the world's most expensive wine today.

=== Candidate for the Polish throne and court influence ===
In that same year, a faction of Polish nobles offered Conti the throne of Poland, where King Augustus III was expected to die soon. Conti was able to win the personal support of Louis XV for his candidacy. However, the policy of the king's ministers was to establish the ruling house of Saxony upon the throne in Poland, as Louis XV's daughter-in-law, Marie-Josèphe of Saxony, was a daughter of the ailing Augustus. As a result of this conflict, Louis XV began secret communications with his ambassadors at certain influential foreign courts that opposed the official communications being sent to those same ambassadors by his ministers. The system of couriers used to relay the king's secret messages developed later into a spy-network known as the Secret du Roi.

Although Conti did not secure the Polish throne, he did remain in the confidence of the king until 1755, when Madame de Pompadour destroyed his influence through her intrigues at court. His relationship with Louis XV deteriorated enough that when the Seven Years' War broke out in 1756, Conti was refused the command of the army of the Rhine. Angry, he began opposing the royal government, which caused Louis to refer to him as, "my cousin, the advocate".

In 1771, Conti took the lead in opposing the chancellor, Maupeou. He supported the parlements against the government and was hostile to Turgot especially. Due to the intensity of his anti-government feelings, he was suspected of aiding an uprising which took place in Dijon in 1775.

=== Later life ===
He was exiled from court and, following involvement in a Frondiste association with Protestants and with the affairs of Parlement, Conti settled into stylish retirement as Grand Prior of the Knights of the Order of Malta, resident at the Palais du Temple in Le Marais.

Eventually, Conti accumulated a vast and celebrated art collection, which he housed in a special gallery at the Temple, having collected it mainly during the last twenty years of his life. This was dispersed by auction between April and June 1777, a sale which impacted the Parisian art market through the following decade. His collection included Michel Barthélemy Ollivier's English Tea Served in the Salon des Glaces at the Palais du Temple, dated 1764, showing the infant Mozart at the clavichord (now in the Palace of Versailles).

Conti inherited literary tastes from his father, was a brave and skillful general, and a diligent student of military history. His mistress, the cultivated Comtesse de Boufflers, presided over a salon at his home in Paris, which attracted many men of letters. Through his mistress, he became a patron of Jean Jacques Rousseau.

His son, Louis François Joseph, succeeded him and became the last Prince of Conti.

== Issue ==
Name	Portrait	Lifespan	Notes
Louis François Joseph de Bourbon; Prince of Conti		1 September 1734 - 13 March 1814	Born in Paris, he was known as the "Count of La Marche" before succeeding as Prince of Conti; married his first cousin, Maria Fortunata d'Este, the daughter of Francesco III d'Este, Duke of Modena and Charlotte Aglaé d'Orléans, the sister of his mother; had no legitimate issue; died in Barcelona, Spain, at the age of 79.
X de Bourbon		26 September 1736	Born at the Château d'Issy, the child was a stillbirth, whose mother died after the birth.

== Ancestors ==
Ancestors of Louis François, Prince of Conti

8. Armand de Bourbon, Prince of Conti
4. François Louis, Prince of Conti
9. Anne Marie Martinozzi
2. Louis Armand de Bourbon, Prince of Conti
10. Henri Jules de Bourbon, Prince of Condé
5. Marie Thérèse de Bourbon
11. Anne Henriette of Bavaria
1. Louis François de Bourbon, Prince of Conti
12. Henri Jules de Bourbon, Prince of Condé =10
6. Louis de Bourbon, Prince of Condé
13. Anne Henriette of Bavaria =11
3. Louise Élisabeth de Bourbon
14. Louis XIV of France
7. Louise Françoise de Bourbon, Légitimée de France
15. Françoise-Athénaïs de Rochechouart de Mortemart, Marchioness of Montespan
