= Louise Adélaïde de Bourbon (1696–1750) =

French noble

- Mademoiselle de La Roche-sur-Yon
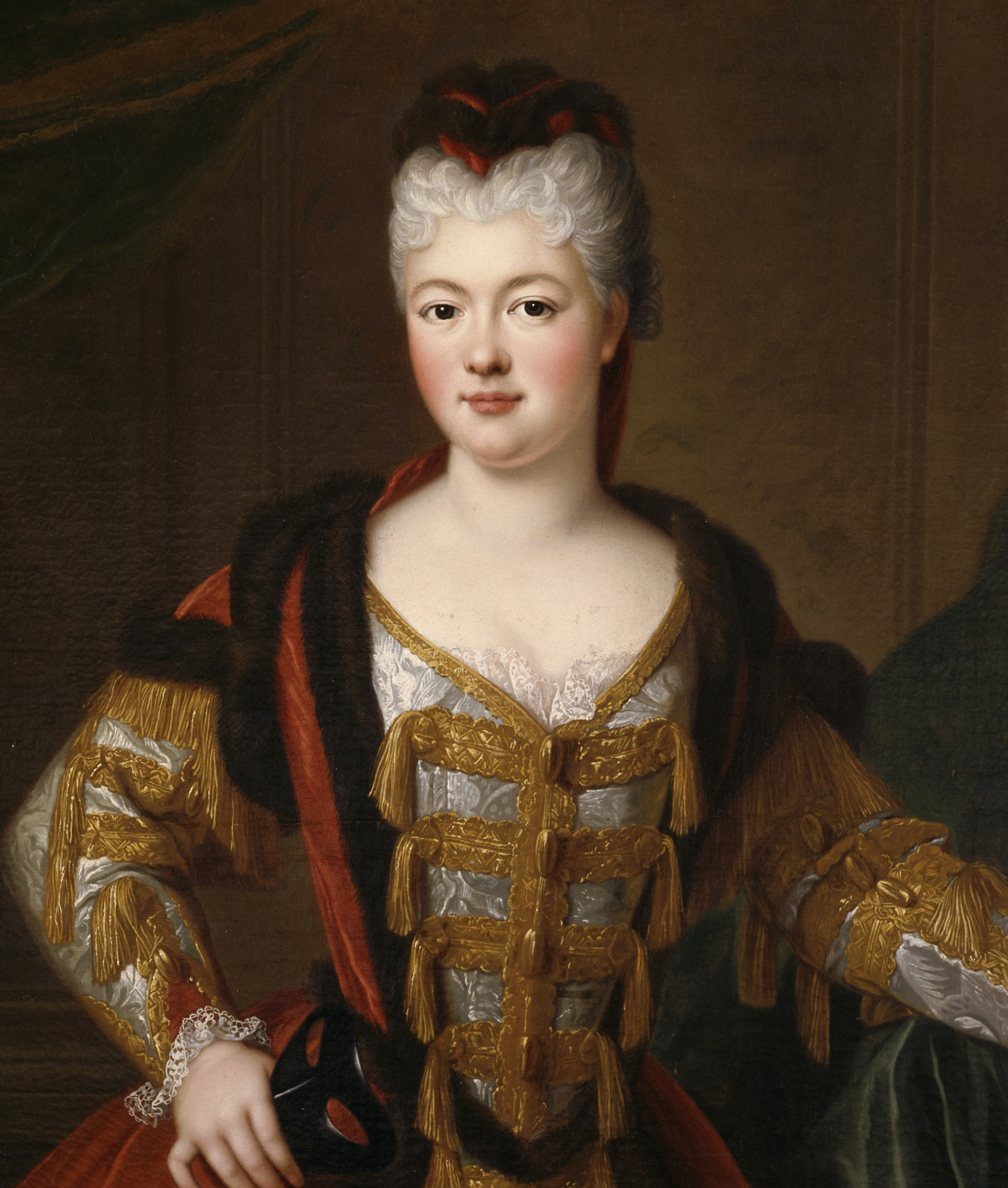
- Portrait by Pierre Gobert
- Born: 2 November 1696; Hôtel de Conti (quai Conti), Paris, France
- Died: 20 November 1750 (aged 54); Paris, France
- Burial: Carmel du faubourg Saint-Jacques, Paris
- House: Bourbon-Conti
- Father: François Louis, Prince of Conti
- Mother: Marie Thérèse de Bourbon

Louise Adélaïde de Bourbon (2 November 1696 – 20 November 1750) was a French princess of the Blood and member of the courts of Kings Louis XIV and Louis XV. She never married, but she had many illegitimate children.

== Biography ==
Born at the Hôtel de Conti in Paris Louise Adélaïde was the youngest surviving daughter of François Louis, Prince of Conti and his wife Marie Thérèse de Bourbon. From birth, Louise Adélaïde was known by her style of Mademoiselle de La Roche-sur-Yon. Her oldest sister was Marie Anne de Bourbon (1689–1720), future Princess of Condé; her oldest surviving brother was Louis Armand de Bourbon, the future Prince of Conti.

The year after her birth, her father was made the Titular King of Poland by Louis XIV but later declined the offer due to his affections for the Duchess of Bourbon, his mistress and daughter of the king. On 16 February 1707 she was baptised in the Royal Chapel of Versailles and named in honour of Louis, Grand Dauphin and Marie Adélaïde, Duchess of Burgundy.

In 1709, Mademoiselle de La Roche-sur-Yon lost her father and her brother succeeded as Prince of Conti. Her older sister married in 1713 at the age of 24; the groom was her maternal cousin Louis Henri, Duke of Bourbon.

Louise Adélaïde never married, although in 1714 it was thought that she might marry Philip V of Spain and in 1748, a marriage was projected with Stanisław I Leszczyński, former King of Poland

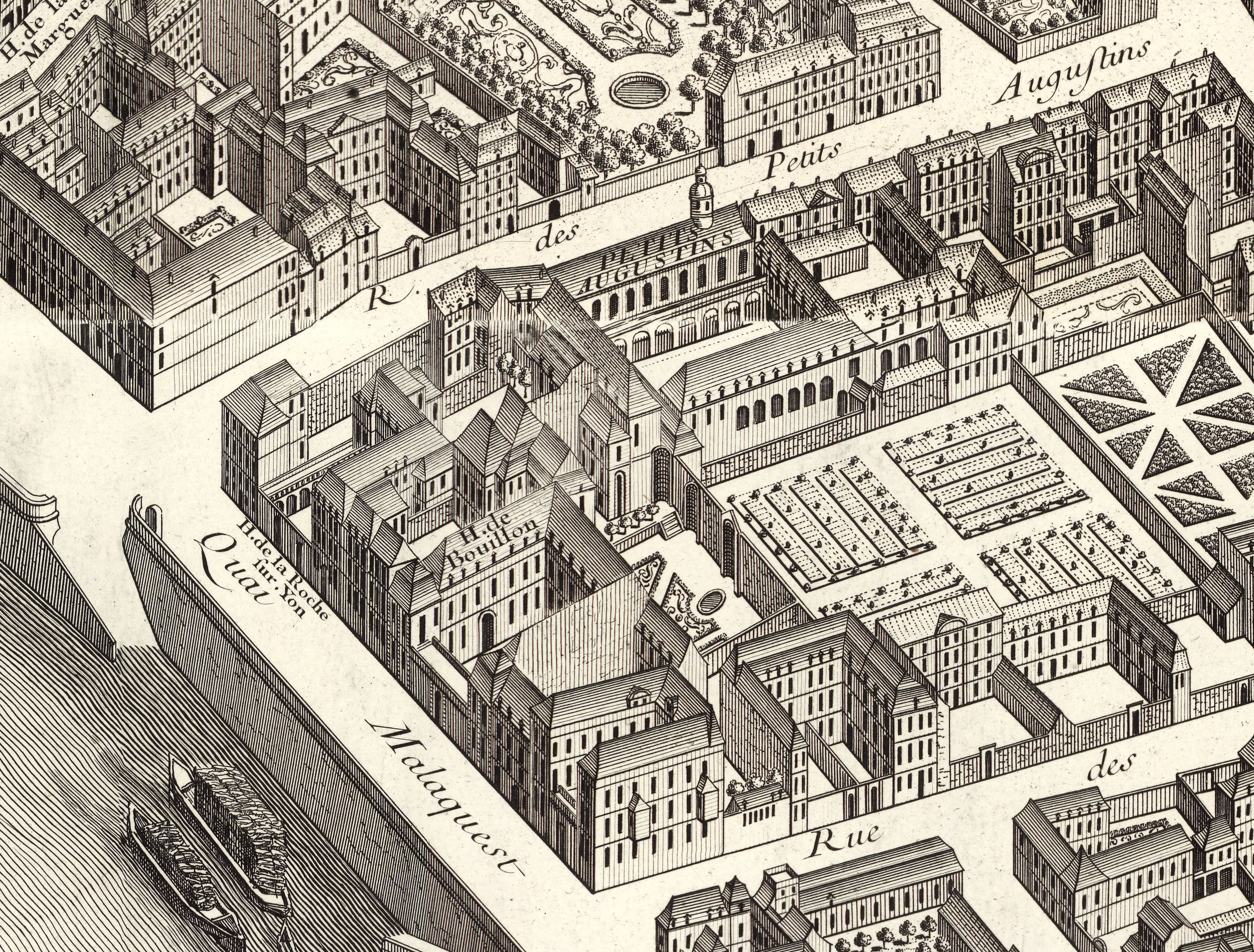
The Hôtel de La Roche-sur-Yon on the 1739 Turgot map of Paris

At the death of her sister the Princess of Condé in 1720, Louise Adélaïde was given all property owned by the Princess – much to the annoyance of the Prince of Condé, Duke of Bourbon.

In 1732 her mother died having reconciled with her children – the Conti family had been estranged from their mother due to their father's behaviour. It was around this time that she purchased the Hôtel de Lauzun on the quai Malaquais from Geneviève Marie de Durfort, the widow of the Duke de Lauzun. At that time it became known as Hôtel de La Roche-sur-Yon and is shown with this name on the 1739 Turgot map of Paris.

== Death ==
Having outlived all her siblings and parents, Mademoiselle de La Roche-sur-Yon died in Paris at the age of 54. She was buried at the Carmel du faubourg Saint-Jacques cemetery, in the capital, Paris, France.

René Louis de Voyer de Paulmy, Marquis d'Argenson noted in his memoirs: "Mademoiselle de la Roche-sur-Yon, princess of the blood, died last night of the smallpox. She was a good princess, and left many bastards."

== Ancestry ==
Ancestors of Louise Adélaïde de Bourbon (1696–1750)

8. Henri II, Prince of Condé
4. Armand, Prince of Conti
9. Charlotte Marguerite de Montmorency
2. François Louis, Prince of Conti
10. Girolamo Martinozzi
5. Anne Marie Martinozzi
11. Laura Margherita Mazzarini
1. Louise Adélaïde de Bourbon
12. Louis II, Prince of Condé
6. Henri Jules, Prince of Condé
13. Claire Clémence de Maillé
3. Marie Thérèse de Bourbon
14. Edward, Count Palatine of Simmern
7. Anne Henriette of Bavaria
15. Anna Gonzaga
