= French frigate Railleuse (1689) =

French Navy 18-gun ship

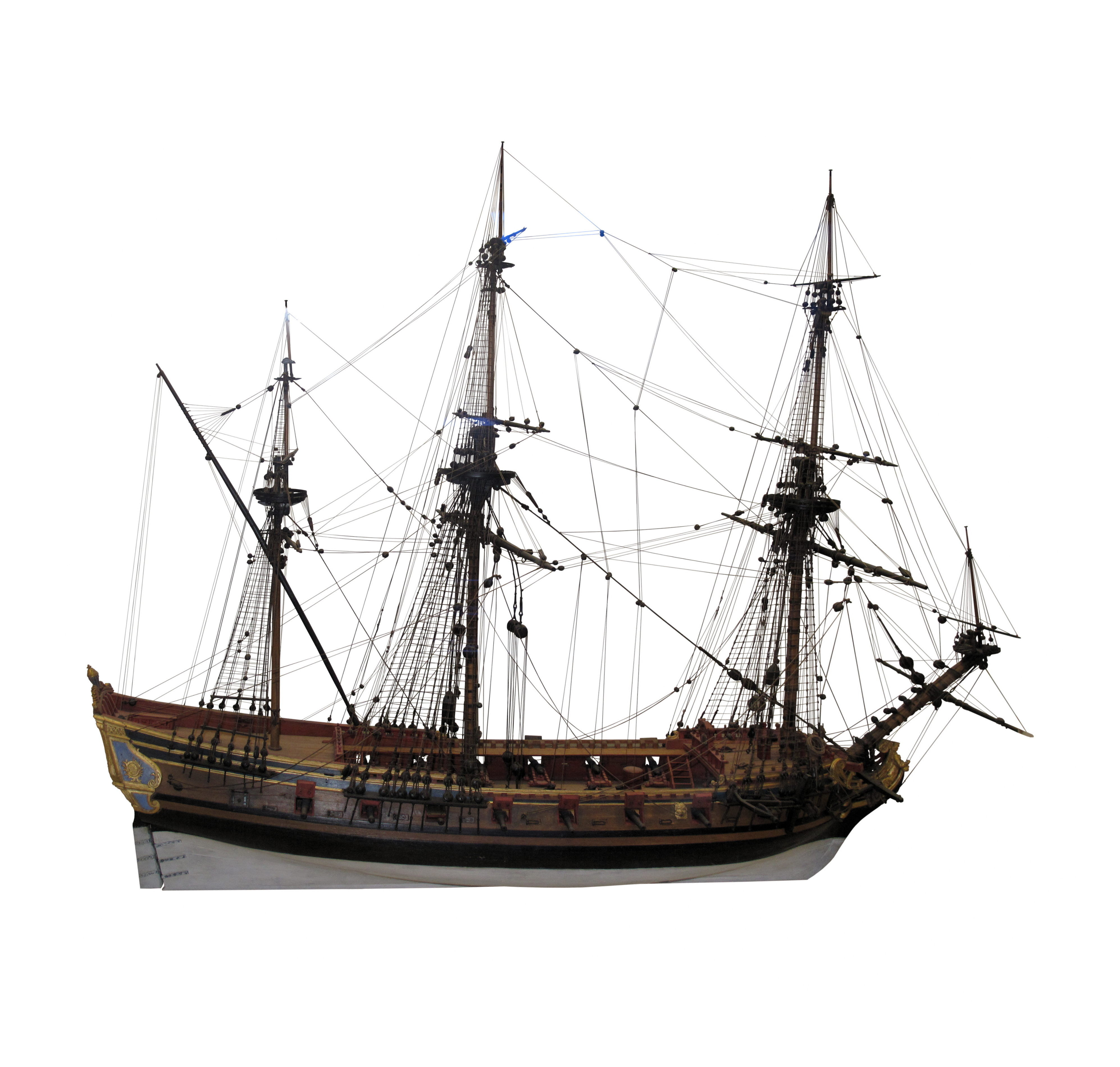
- 1/50th scale model of Railleuse, on display at the Swiss Museum of Transport.

History

France
- Name: Railleuse
- Namesake: "banteter", "jester" (female form)
- Builder: Dunkirk
- Launched: 1689
- Fate: Destroyed on 5 August 1703

General characteristics
- Class & type: Frigate
- Tonnage: 160
- Length: 28.6 m (93 ft 10 in)
- Beam: 4.4 m (14 ft 5 in)
- Draft: 3.1 m (10 ft 2 in)
- Complement: 90
- Armament: 18 × 6-pounder long guns
- Armour: timber

Railleuse was an 18-gun frigate of the French Navy, launched in 1689.

== Career ==
Under Captain Jean Bart, Railleuse ferried François Louis, Prince of Conti to Poland, departing Dunkirk on 6 September 1697 and reaching Gdańsk on the 20th. She then returned him to France on 11 December.

She was destroyed by fire on 5 August 1703, along with Joyeuse, when three English ships of the line attacked the convoy that she was escorting.
