= Louis Henri, Duke of Bourbon =

French royal and politician (1692–1740)

Louis Henri
- Prince of Condé; Duke of Bourbon; Grand Master of France
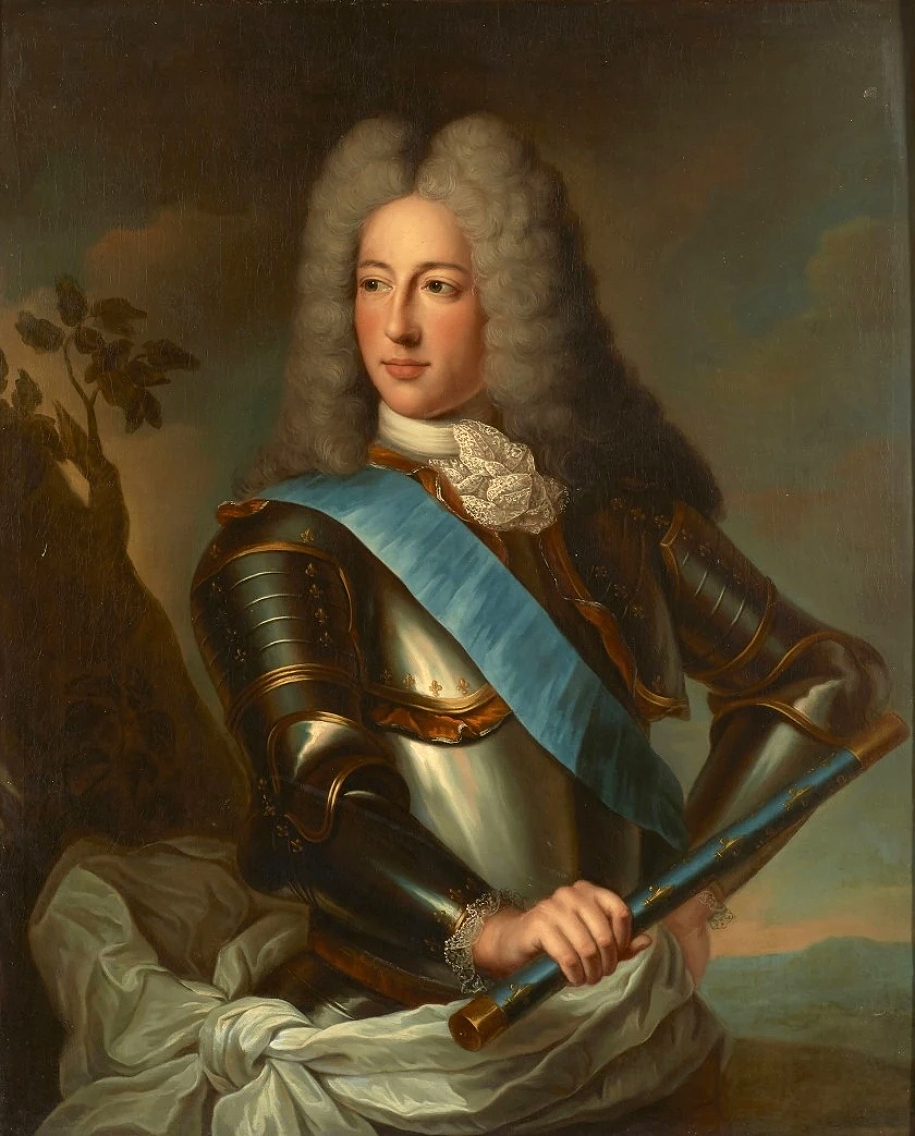

Prince of Condé
- Tenure: 4 March 1710 – 27 January 1740
- Predecessor: Louis III
- Successor: Louis Joseph

First Minister of State
- In office 2 December 1723 – 11 June 1726
- Preceded by: Philippe II, Duke of Orléans
- Succeeded by: André-Hercule de Fleury
- Born: 18 August 1692; Palace of Versailles, Île-de-France, France.
- Died: 27 January 1740 (aged 47); Château de Chantilly, Île-de-France, France
- Burial: Église Collégiale Saint-Martin, Colmar, France
- Spouse: Marie Anne de Bourbon (m. 1713; died 1720) Landgravine Caroline of Hesse-Rotenburg (m. 1728)
- Issue: Louis Joseph, Prince of Condé; Henriette, Marquise de Laguiche
Names
- Louis Henri Joseph de Bourbon
- House: Bourbon-Condé
- Father: Louis III, Prince of Condé
- Mother: Louise Françoise de Bourbon
- Religion: Catholicism
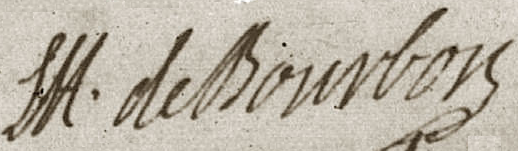
- Signature

Louis Henri, Duke of Bourbon (Louis Henri Joseph; 18 August 1692 – 27 January 1740), was a French nobleman and politician who served as Prime Minister of France from 1723 to 1726. As a member of the reigning House of Bourbon, he was a prince du sang.

Louis Henri was the second child and eldest son of Louis III, Prince of Condé, and Louise Françoise de Bourbon, the eldest daughter of King Louis XIV and his mistress Madame de Montespan. Following the death of his father in 1710, he became head of the Bourbon-Condé cadet branch of the House of Bourbon. As such, he was entitled to be known as Prince of Condé, but he used the title Duke of Bourbon instead and was known at court as Monsieur le Duc. After his maternal grandfather died in 1715, Louis Henri became a member of the regency council led by Philippe II, Duke of Orléans, the regent for the new minor king Louis XV.

In 1723, Louis Henri succeeded the Duke of Orléans as chief minister to Louis XV. He negotiated the King's marriage to the Polish princess Marie Leszczyńska. In 1726, Louis XV dismissed Louis Henri as chief minister and replaced him with Cardinal de Fleury. Louis Henri died at his manor, the Château de Chantilly, in 1740. His titles were inherited by his 4-year-old son, Louis Joseph.

== Early years ==
Louis Henri was born at Versailles, the eldest son of Louis III, Prince of Condé and Louise Françoise de Bourbon, the eldest legitimised daughter of Louis XIV and his maîtresse-en-titre, Madame de Montespan. He was styled at birth Duke of Enghien, and as congratulations for his birth, his grandmother Madame de Montespan gifted his mother her finest pearl and diamond parure for her daughter.

He was the great-grandson of Louis de Bourbon, le Grand Condé, and ranked as a prince du sang. Following the death one after the other of the heirs to the throne of France in the early 18th century (except for the duc d'Anjou, great-grandson of Louis XIV and future king as Louis XV) Bourbon was third in the order of succession to the throne, being preceded for a time only by Philippe, the 2nd duc d'Orléans who became regent, and the latter's son, Louis d'Orléans, duc de Chartres.

He was described in a contemporary description of him as:

moderately good looking as a young man, but being over-tall he afterwards began to stoop, and became 'as thin and dry as a chip of wood.'

Satirical pamphlets directed against royalty were a common form of literature and the chronicles left by courtiers were influenced by rivalries or prejudice, so he may not have looked so bad. Based on collaborating evidence from other sources, however, it is probably safe to assume that he was tall, and not plump.

It is fairly certain he only had the use of one eye: "He was disfigured by an accident which befell him while hunting, when the Duke of Berry put out one of his eyes," probably before he was twenty-five.

== Regency ==
In September 1715, Philippe d'Orléans, who had just become regent for the 5-year-old king Louis XV, appointed the then 23-year-old duc de Bourbon to his first Regency Council, the highest consultative body in the French government during the king's minority (equivalent to the Conseil d'en-haut, appointed by adult kings).

In 1718, he replaced Louis-Auguste de Bourbon, duc du Maine as superintendent of the king's education. This happened at the Regency Council meeting of 26 August, at which Maine and Louis-Alexandre de Bourbon, Comte de Toulouse, legitimised sons (princes légitimés de France) of Louis XIV, were demoted in rank. The actual instruction of the young king was not much disturbed however, since it was mostly done by his old and trusted tutor, André-Hercule de Fleury, Bishop of Fréjus, who remained in place.

Many of the surviving descriptions of the duke's personality are highly uncomplimentary. They fall under the general categories greed, bad manners, stupidity. For example, Barbier said he "had a very limited mind, knows nothing, and only likes pleasure and hunting." He was described as pretending to like hunting to ingratiate himself with the king.

== Prime minister ==
The Regency ended when Louis XV reached the age of majority, thirteen, in February 1723. Cardinal Dubois, who had been the Regent's premier ministre, remained in that capacity for the king. However, Dubois died in August 1723. Thereupon the former regent became the king's premier ministre, until his own death the following 2 December. Bourbon rushed to see the king that very evening and requested the prime ministership. Cardinal de Fleury, who was present at the meeting, recommended acceptance, and Louis XV indicated his assent by a silent nod. Guizot says that Louis "sought in his perceptor's [tutor's] eyes the guidance he needed". G. P. Gooch and Perkins also said that Fréjus acquiesced in the appointment. Jones, on the other hand, says that Fréjus was not there; also that after the meeting, in order to protect his own influence with the king, which was great, Fréjus got the king to agree never to hold discussions with Bourbon unless he too was present. This was an unusual, and for Bourbon, eventually an intolerable situation. Orléans had been able to see the king whenever he wanted. Within a few years Fréjus was able to assume control of the government himself.

To assess why the king — or Fréjus — chose, or allowed, Bourbon to become premier ministre, says the French lawyer and writer d'Angerville, writing in 1781:

In making the choice, which no doubt was not the best he might have made, because he lacked the necessary experience not only of men but of himself, he nevertheless acted in strict accordance with the rules of etiquette. He deemed it his duty to confer the post, which was the most important in the kingdom, upon a prince of the royal house. As they were all young men, he appointed the eldest, who, however, was but thirty one years old. The manner in which His Royal Highness [the Duc de Bourbon] had managed his own revenues, and had added to them, despite his youth (that being a period when a man's thoughts are wont to be exclusively centred upon pleasure) was a strong presumption that he would prove a capable public administrator, and the fact that he was already rich led people to imagine that he would not trouble his head about adding to his fortune. Finance, indeed, was the most important branch of public affairs at that time. What France needed was a government which would pursue a policy of peace, conciliation and retrenchment, and avail itself of the tranquil condition of Europe in order to bring about by trade, industry and the gradual restoration of the metal reserve, a recovery from the state of exhaustion into which the country had fallen. [From the wars in Louis XIV's reign.] No one, however, failed to appreciate how immensely inferior in talent the Duke was to the Regent.

One of Bourbon's first moves as prime minister was to replace d'Argenson, the minister of police, with Nicolas Ravot d'Ombreval, who was a relative of Bourbon's mistress, the marquise de Prie. This gave Bourbon control of press censorship, and also gave him control of much of the mail.

He made the first promotion to the rank of Marshal of France since 1715 — and made some new appointments to France's highest chivalric order, the Order of the Holy Spirit (Ordre du Saint-Esprit). The recipients were almost all supporters of Monsieur le Duc.

=== Persecution of Protestants ===
The persecution of the Huguenots under the reign of Louis XIV was stopped by the regent, despite those who continued to advocate rigour in the treatment of the Protestants. Prominent among these was the Archbishop of Rouen, Louis III de La Vergne de Tressan, Grand Almoner of France during the Regency. He argued with both the regent and his most influential minister, Cardinal Dubois, in favour of severe measures against Protestants. They rejected his ideas.

When Bourbon came to be prime minister, however, the bishop found in him a more receptive audience, and he was given the go-ahead to draw up a general law against heresy.

== King's affairs ==
One of the most notable achievements of the Duke's premiership was the arrangement of the King's marriage. The King had been betrothed to Mariana Victoria, the infanta of Spain, daughter of the Spanish king, in 1721, when she was just three years old, and the French king only eleven. By 1724, the king was fourteen but the infanta was still a decade away from child-bearing age. Some felt that this was too long for France to wait for an heir. This was especially so because, if Louis XV died without an heir, it was feared that, armed with a hereditary right he had renounced when he became king of Spain, Philip V de Bourbon, who had recently abdicated the Spanish throne, would ignore the Treaty of Utrecht and claim the French throne, thus plunging France and Spain into conflict with the other European powers.

It appears that by the summer of 1724, the marquise de Prie, and possibly also Monsieur le Duc, were considering breaking Louis XV's engagement with the infanta, despite the great offence this would cause Spain, and finding him a wife who might provide the country with an heir at an earlier date.

By, at latest, the winter of 1724, replacement of the infanta was being considered. Candidates included the Duke's sisters, especially Mademoiselle de Vermandois. Mme de Prie was opposed to this choice because it would give the duchesse de Bourbon, Vermandois and the duke's mother too much influence. The duchess and Mme de Prie did not like each other. Furthermore, Fréjus was opposed to Louis marrying anyone from the Bourbon-Condé branch of the royal family.

In April 1725, the seven-year-old infanta was sent back to Madrid — Louis did not even say goodbye to her. A new candidate was sought urgently because, should Louis die with no heir, and assuming Philippe V of Spain did not seize the throne, then it would pass to the new duc d'Orléans, son of the deceased regent; the House of Orléans and the House of Condé were rivals, so this would cast Monsieur le Duc into the political wastelands.

Prominent among these was a daughter of George II of Great Britain. The prize was offered to her if she would consent to become a Catholic. However that would have caused great difficulties for her father, as he was occupying the British throne mainly because he was Protestant, whereas his rival, James Stuart, was Catholic; he had to politely decline the offer of France to his daughter.

Another prominent contender was the grand duchess, later empress, Elizabeth of Russia. Others on the list included the Princess Anne Charlotte of Lorraine; a princess of Savoy who was Louis XV's first cousin, and the Landgravine Caroline of Hesse-Rotenburg.

== Marie Leszczynska ==
The choice finally made was the daughter of the deposed king of Poland. Her name was Marie Leszczyńska; her father, Stanislaus, had occupied the Polish throne from 1704 with the backing of Charles XII of Sweden. He lost it after five years because his sponsor was beaten by Peter the Great of Russia, at Poltava. Stanislaus had found refuge, first in Germany, then in France, where the regent had given him a house at Wissembourg in Alsace, a pension of fifty thousand livres, irregularly paid, and, as a sign of respect, a few regiments of soldiers as an honour guard; they, along with a handful of retainers who had followed the forsaken king in his wanderings, comprised his bare little court. "His property in Poland had been confiscated and his wife's jewels pawned.

Marie did not have a reputation for great beauty or intelligence, but she was not ugly, was healthy as well as kind, generous, and calm. She had already been thought of as a wife for the duc de Bourbon. Now he and Mme de Prie decided she would be ideal for the King. On 31 March 1725, the Council met and agreed that the offer would go to Marie Leszczyńska. On 27 May, the name of the Queen-to-be was made public.

The young duc d'Orléans stood in for the bridegroom during the marriage by procuration, which took place in the cathedral of Strasbourg, and was officiated by the Cardinal de Rohan, bishop of Strasbourg and Grand Almoner of France. The bride and groom were wed in person at Fontainebleau.

Bourbon remained prime minister until his dismissal in 1726 in favour of the young king's tutor, Cardinal Fleury.

Saint-Simon, the memoir writer known for his acid portraits of grandees, described the Duke of Bourbon as a man with "an almost stupid foolishness, an indomitable obstinacy, an insatiable self-interest". On the other hand, the Cardinal de Fleury said that he found in the Duke of Bourbon "goodness, probity, and honour" and that he considered himself one of the duke's friends.

== Later life ==
After his spell in the government, Bourbon was exiled to his country estate, the Château de Chantilly, 40 kilometers northeast of Paris. The château then underwent a sort of renaissance, being described as a "splendid residence.". Bourbon redecorated the building as well as the grounds and entertained there when he could avoid hosting the Parisian set which had banished him. He died there, aged 47. The titles of the Bourbon-Condé family then passed to his 4-year-old son who was to hold the title of prince de Condé for more than seven decades.

== Wealth ==
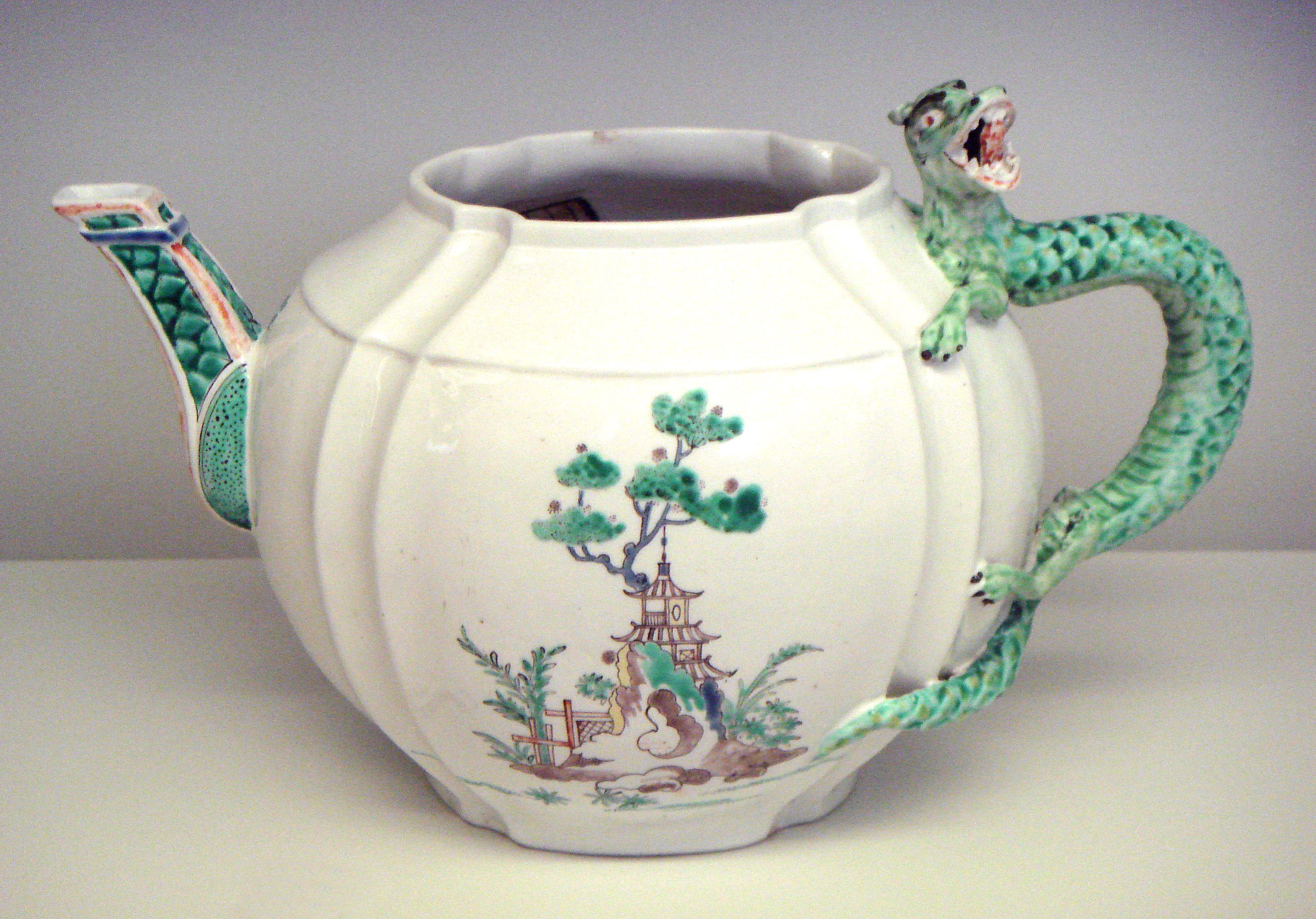
Chantilly soft-paste porcelain teapot 1735-1740

Chantilly porcelain was established by the Prince de Condé. During the Regency his several pensions, together with the income from his extensive estates, gave him an income of 1.8 million livres, the historian Bernier, writing in 1984, estimating the livre as equivalent to about $4.50.

During the Regency he made large amounts of money by speculating in the financial Système (1716–20) of John Law. He bought paper notes, waited for their value to rise, then, before the Système failed in 1720, took them to Law's bank (which had become the national bank) and traded them in for gold. On 3 March 1720, following the example of the Prince de Conti who the day before had gone to Law's bank and withdrawn fourteen million livres in gold in several large carts, Bourbon went to the bank and took away twenty-five million. The bank closed later that year due to lack of reserves. Bourbon made 40 million livres off the Système, or perhaps 20 million. Historian James Breck Perkins says, "he asked enormous advantages in return for the protection he extended [to John Law and his associates], and the unfortunate adventurer [Law] was not in a position to say no to so powerful a nobleman." After the Système went under, "the government compelled some humbler speculators to disgorge their gains, but no one ventured to disturb the head of the house of Condé."

== Marriages and issue ==
On 9 July 1713 at Versailles, he married Marie Anne de Bourbon who died in 1720. Marie Anne was the eldest daughter of Marie Thérèse de Bourbon and François Louis, Prince de Conti. His younger sister Louise Élisabeth de Bourbon, married Marie Anne's brother, Louis Armand II de Bourbon, prince de Conti. They had no children. At her death, Marie Anne gave all her property to her sister Mademoiselle de La Roche-sur-Yon.

On 23 July 1728, he married Caroline of Hesse, a daughter of Ernest Leopold, Landgrave of Hesse-Rotenburg and they had one son:

- Louis Joseph de Bourbon (9 August 1736 – 13 May 1818), who led the Army of Condé during the French Revolutionary Wars.

Caroline had once been on a list of possible wives for Louis XV. Her husband was pardoned by Louis XV in 1730; this was regarding his exile to the Château de Chantilly in 1725. The couple lived at the Palais Bourbon which had been built by her mother-in-law Louise Françoise de Bourbon.

In addition, Louis Henri had an illegitimate daughter with Armande Félice de La Porte Mazarin (1691–1729), the wife of Louis de Mailly, marquis de Nesle (1689–1767), whom he officially recognized,

- Henriette de Bourbon (23 April 1725 – 11 September 1780), Mademoiselle de Verneuil, who married Jean, marquis de Laguiche, (1719–1770) in 1740.

== Notes ==
Louis Henri, Duke of Bourbon House of Bourbon-Condé Cadet branch of the House of Bourbon Born: 18 August 1692 Died: 27 January 1740
French royalty
Preceded by Louis de Bourbon	Duc de Bourbon; 18 August 1692 – 27 January 1740	Succeeded by Louis Joseph de Bourbon
Preceded by Louis de Bourbon	Duc d'Enghien; 18 August 1692 – 27 January 1740	Succeeded by Louis V Joseph de Bourbon-Condé
Preceded by Louis de Bourbon	Prince de Condé; 4 March 1710 – 27 January 1740	Succeeded by Louis Joseph de Bourbon
Royal titles
Preceded by Louis de Bourbon	Monsieur le Duc; 4 March 1710 – 27 January 1740	Succeeded by Louis Joseph de Bourbon
Political offices
Preceded by Philippe d'Orléans	Prime Minister of France; 1723-1726	Succeeded by André-Hercule de Fleury, Évêque de Fréjus
