= Marie Thérèse de Bourbon =

Queen of Poland (titular) (1666–1732)

- Queen consort of Poland & Grand Duchess consort of Lithuania (titular); Princess of Conti
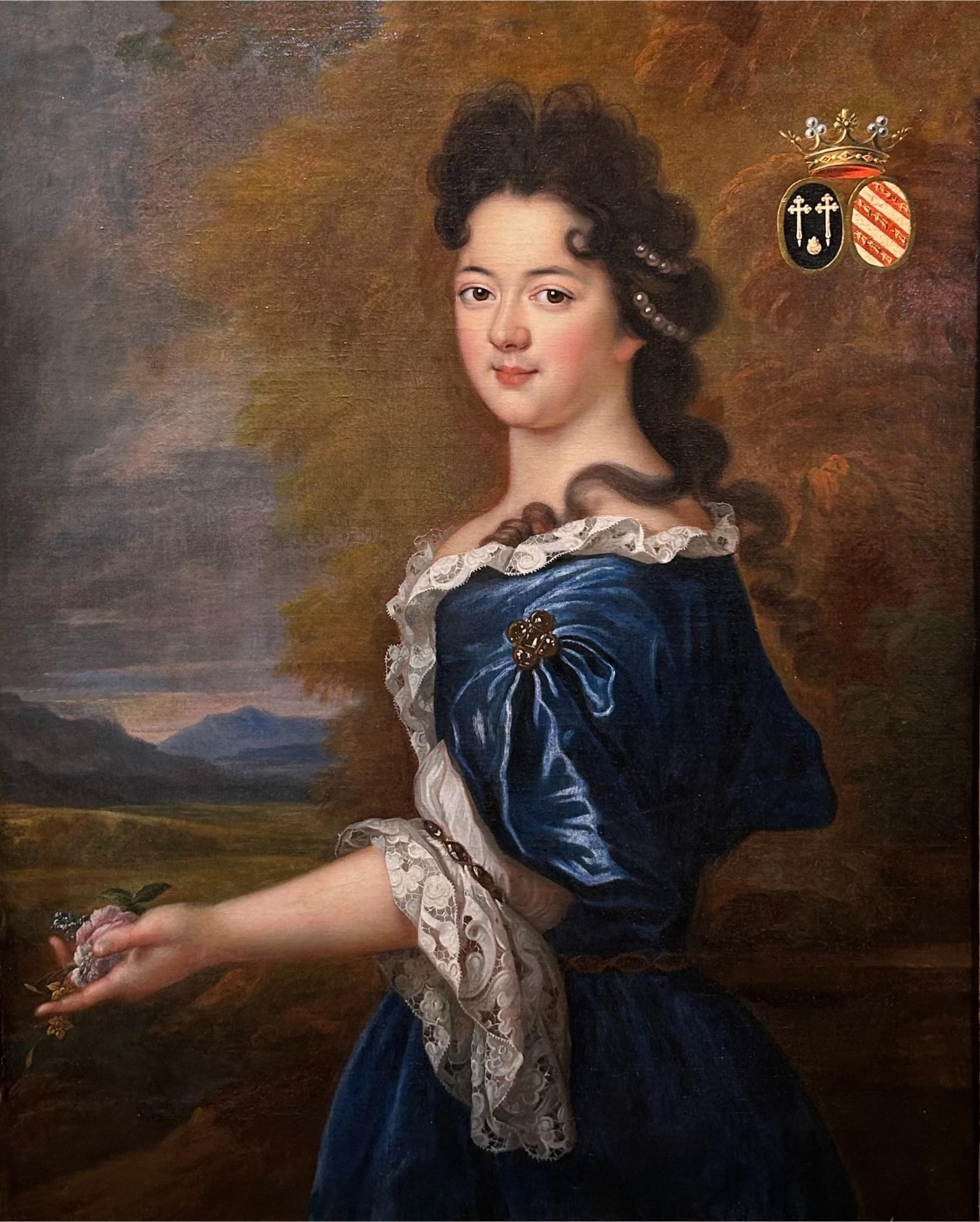
- Born: 1 February 1666; Hôtel de Condé, Paris, France
- Died: 22 February 1732 (aged 66); Hôtel de Conti (quai Conti), Paris, France
- Burial: Église Saint-André des Arcs, L'Isle-Adam, France
- Spouse: François Louis, Prince of Conti (m. 1688; died 1709)
- Issue Detail: Marie Anne, Princess of Condé; Louis Armand II, Prince of Conti; Louise Adélaïde, Mademoiselle de La Roche-sur-Yon
Names
- Marie Thérèse de Bourbon
- House: Bourbon-Condé
- Father: Henri Jules, Prince of Condé
- Mother: Anne Henriette of the Palatinate

Marie Thérèse de Bourbon (1 February 1666 – 22 February 1732) was the titular Queen consort of Poland in 1697. She was the daughter of the Prince of Condé. As a member of France's reigning House of Bourbon, she was a princesse du sang.

== Biography ==
Marie Thérèse de Bourbon, was born at the Hôtel de Condé in Paris on 1 February 1666 to Henri-Jules de Bourbon, prince de Condé, the then Duke of Bourbon, and Princess Anne Henriette of the Palatinate. Known from birth as Mademoiselle de Bourbon, she was named after the queen, Maria Theresa of Spain (wife of King Louis XIV).

On her father’s side, she belonged to a cadet branch of the French royal House of Bourbon; on her mother’s side, she descended from German and English royalty, including the House of Nassau.

It was planned for her to marry the Italian Emmanuel Philibert of Savoy, Prince de Carignan, but on 22 January 1688, Marie-Thérèse married François Louis, Prince of Conti, le Grand Conti, head of the Conti cadet branch of the House of Bourbon, in the chapel of Versailles.

The bride was passionately in love with her husband, but his attentions were elsewhere. It was well known at court that he had an affair with his wife's sister-in-law, the Duchess of Bourbon; it was also said that he had homosexual tendencies and did not pay his wife much attention.

Marie Thérèse had a difficult relationship with her children and, as a result, lived quietly at the various Conti residences, mainly at the Château de L'Isle-Adam. The family later reconciled after the death of the Prince de Conti. Marie Thérèse was known for her quiet personality and her piety, much praised by many at court. Elizabeth Charlotte of the Palatinate, Dowager Duchess of Orléans and mother of the Regent Philippe d'Orléans, wrote of the widowed Marie Thérèse:

This Princess is the only one of the House of Condé who is good for anything. I think she must have some German blood in her veins. She is little, and somewhat on one side, but she is not hunchbacked. She has fine eyes, like her father; with this exception, she has no pretensions to beauty, but she is virtuous and pious. What she has suffered on account of her husband has excited general compassion;

=== Queen of Poland ===
In 1697, Marie Thérèse's husband was offered the Crown of Poland by Louis XIV. The Prince de Conti went to Poland to inspect his potential new kingdom, while Marie Thérèse stayed in France. During this time, she was considered the titular Queen of Poland and her husband the king. Based on votes that cast by the Polish nobility, her husband was the more popular candidate, but when he arrived in Gdańsk, he found that Augustus II the Strong had taken his place on the throne, and so he returned to France.

=== Dowager princess ===
In 1709, her husband died in Paris. In order to tell the widows apart after the death of their respective husbands, the dowager Princesses of Conti were each accorded the title of Douairière preceded by the number corresponding to the order in which they had been consort to the head of the Bourbon-Contis, e.g., Madame la Princesse de Conti première douairière. In 1727 the two dowager Princesses de Conti were joined by a third, Louise Élisabeth de Bourbon.

After the death of her husband, she started to renovate the Parisian home of the Conti family, the Hôtel de Conti on the Quai de Conti on the left bank of the Seine.

In 1713, her daughter Marie Anne married Louis Henri, Duke of Bourbon, known as Monsieur le Duc, the son of her husband's former mistress Louise-Françoise de Bourbon, Princess de Condé On the same day, in a double wedding ceremony at Versailles, her son, the new Prince de Conti, married another child of the Princess de Condé, Louise Élisabeth de Bourbon, who then took the title that Marie Thérèse had had for almost thirty years.

On 30 May 1716, Marie Thérèse purchased empty land to the west of the Hôtel de Seignelay on the rue de Bourbon (now rue de Lille) and commissioned the architect Robert de Cotte to design a new hôtel particulier. On 27 December 1718, when the building was still incomplete and unoccupied, she sold it to her brother-in-law and sister (Louis Auguste, Duke of Maine and Louise Bénédicte de Bourbon), who hired a new architect, Armand-Claude Mollet, to redesign and complete it, after which it became known as the Hôtel du Maine (destroyed 1838).

Marie Thérèse died on 22 February 1732 at the Hôtel de Conti, probably due to the syphilis she had contracted from her husband. She was buried at the Église Saint-André des Arcs, in L'Isle d'Adam.

Through her granddaughter Louise Henriette de Bourbon-Conti, Duchess d'Orléans, grandmother of Louis Philippe, King of the French, Marie Thérèse is an ancestor of several of Europe's 19th and 20th century monarchs.

== Issue ==
- Marie Anne de Bourbon (18 April 1689 - 21 March 1720) married Louis Henri, Duke of Bourbon but had no issue.
- Prince of La Roche-sur-Yon (18 November 1693 - 22 November 1693), died in infancy.
- Prince de La Roche-sur-Yon (1 December 1694 - 25 April 1698), died in childhood.
- Louis Armand de Bourbon, Prince de Conti (10 November 1695 - 4 May 1727) married Louise Élisabeth de Bourbon-Condé and had issue.
- Louise Adélaïde de Bourbon (2 November 1696 – 20 November 1750) died unmarried.
- Mademoiselle d'Alais (19 November 1697 - 13 August 1699), died in childhood.
- Louis François de Bourbon, Count d'Alais (27 July 1703 - 21 January 1704), died in infancy.

== Ancestry ==
Ancestors of Marie Thérèse de Bourbon

16. Henri I, Prince of Condé
8. Henri II, Prince de Condé
17. Charlotte Catherine de La Trémoille
4. Louis II, Prince de Condé
18. Henri I, duc de Montmorency
9. Charlotte Marguerite de Montmorency
19. Louise de Budos
2. Henri Jules, Prince of Condé
20. Charles de Maillé, seigneur de Brézé
10. Urbain de Maillé, marquis de Brézé
21. Jacqueline de Thévalle
5. Claire-Clémence de Maillé-Brézé
22. François du Plessis, seigneur de Richelieu
11. Nicole du Plessis de Richelieu
23. Suzanne de La Porte
1. Marie Thérèse de Bourbon
24. Frederick IV, Elector Palatine
12. Frederick V of the Palatinate
25. Louise Juliana of Nassau
6. Edward, Count Palatine of Simmern
26. James I of England and VI of Scotland
13. Elizabeth Stuart
27. Anne of Denmark
3. Anne Henriette of Bavaria
28. Louis Gonzaga, Duke of Nevers
14. Charles Gonzaga, Duke of Mantua and Montferrat
29. Henriette of Cleves
7. Anna Gonzaga
30. Charles, Duke of Mayenne
15. Catherine of Lorraine
31. Henriette of Savoy
