= Hôtel de Conti =

Hôtel de Conti can refer to:

- Hôtel de Conti, the name of the Hôtel du Plessis-Guénégaud on the Quai Malaquais in Paris from 1660 to 1670
- Hôtel de Conti or Grand Hôtel de Conti, the names of the Hôtel de Nevers (left bank) in Paris from 1670 to about 1749
- Hôtel de Conti, the name of the Hôtel de Brienne on the rue Saint-Dominique in Paris from 1733 to 1776
