= Louise Élisabeth de Bourbon =

Princess of Conti (1693–1775)

- Princess of Conti
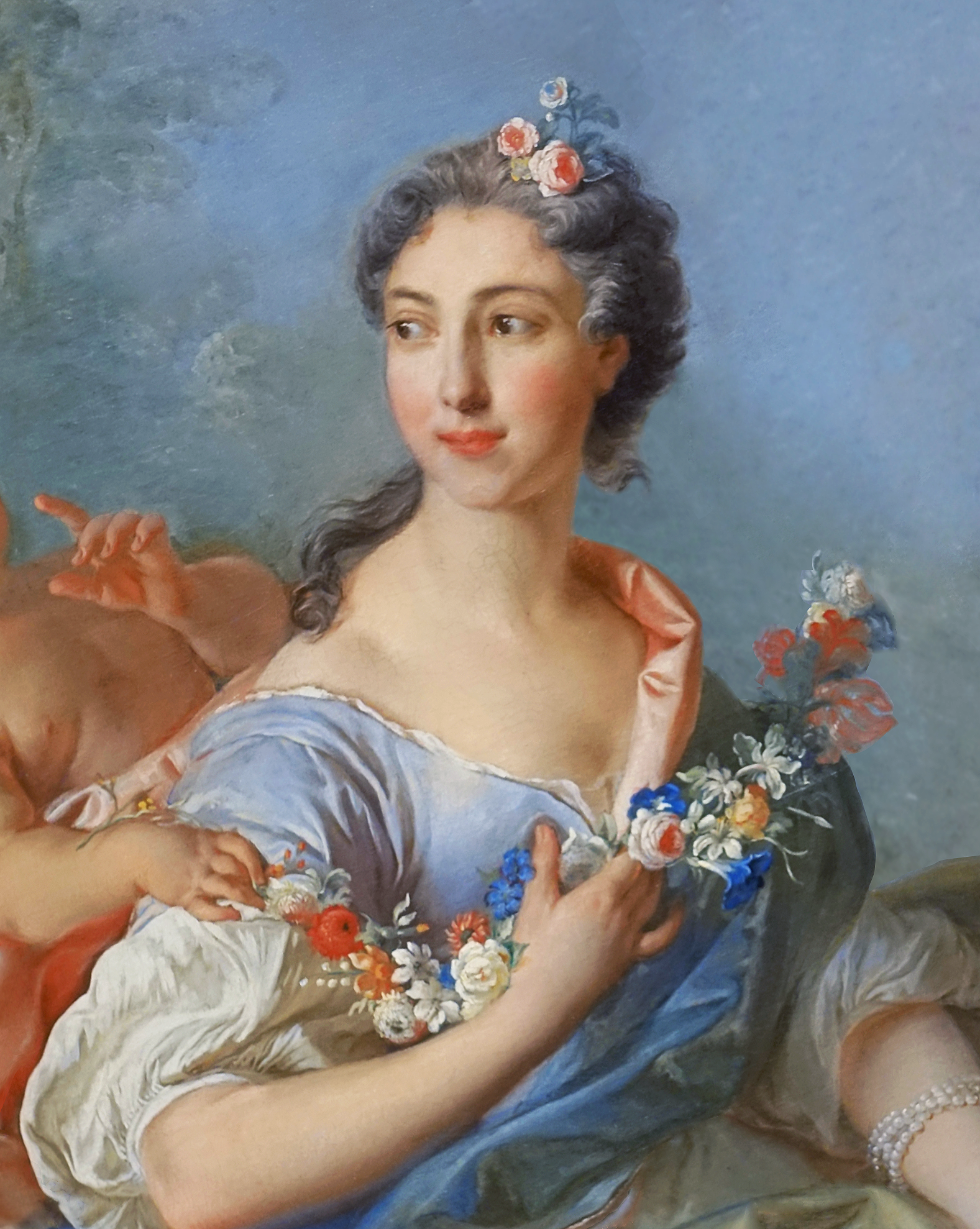
- Louise Élisabeth by Noël-Nicolas Coypel
- Born: 22 November 1693; Palace of Versailles, Versailles, France.
- Died: 27 May 1775 (aged 81); Hôtel de Conti (rue Saint-Dominique), Paris, France
- Burial: Église Saint-Sulpice, Paris, France.
- Spouse: Louis Armand II, Prince of Conti (m. 1713; died 1727)
- Issue Detail: Louis François I, Prince of Conti; Louise Henriette, Duchess of Orléans
- House: Bourbon-Condé
- Father: Louis III, Prince of Condé
- Mother: Louise-Françoise de Bourbon
- Religion: Roman Catholicism

- Coat of arms of Louise Élisabeth de Bourbon

Louise Élisabeth de Bourbon (22 November 1693 – 27 May 1775) was a daughter of Louis III de Bourbon, Prince of Condé, and his wife, Louise Françoise de Bourbon, légitimée de France, a legitimised daughter of King Louis XIV and his famous mistress, Madame de Montespan.

She was the wife of Louis Armand II de Bourbon, Prince of Conti. It was Louise Élisabeth who presented Madame de Pompadour to the court of King Louis XV. Louise Élisabeth was the Duchess of Étampes in her own right, having succeeded to the title at the death of her aunt, Marie Anne de Bourbon, Dowager Duchess of Vendôme. The county of Sancerre, previously held by her brother Louis Henri I, Prince of Condé, also became her property in 1740 at his death.

== Biography ==
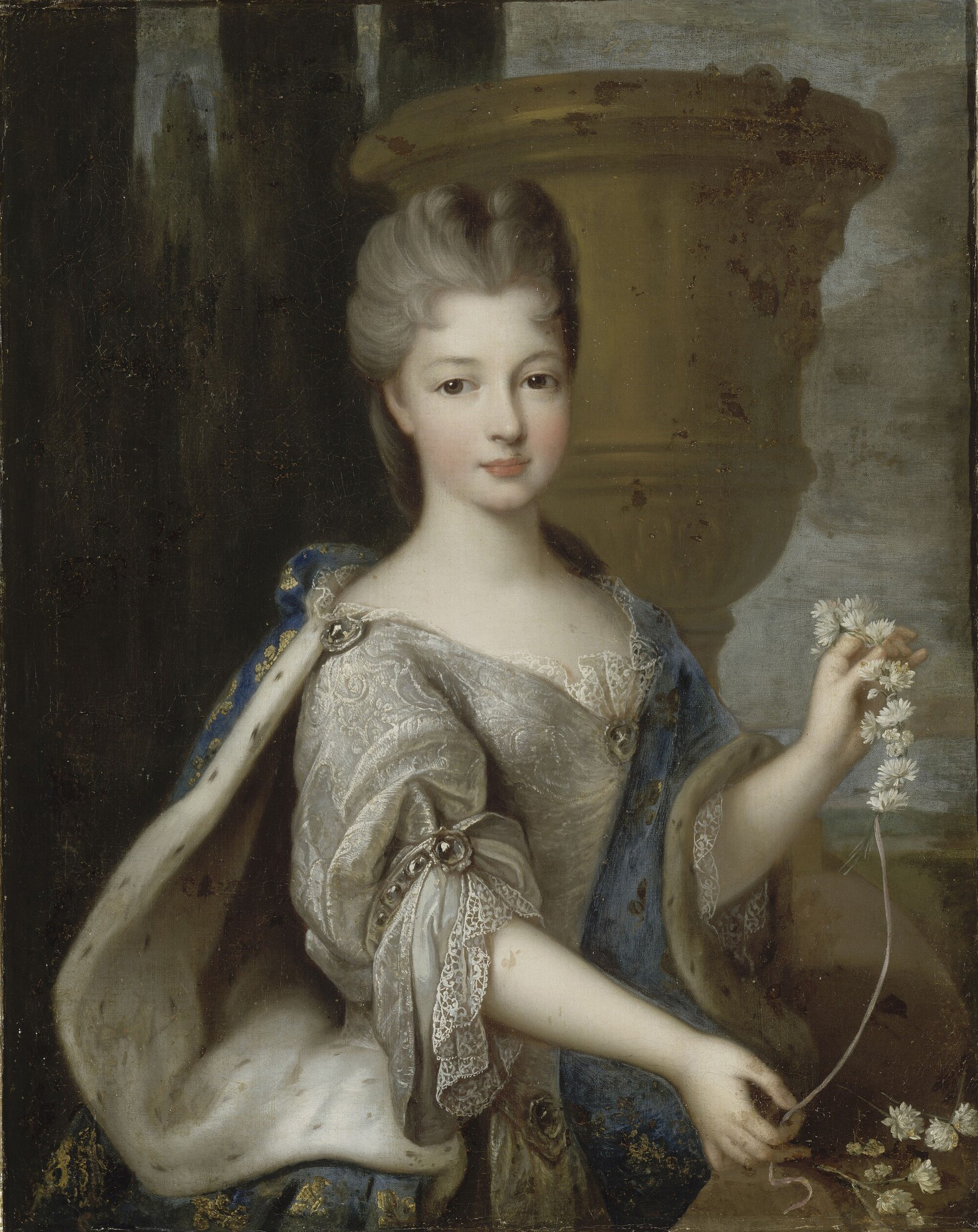
Louise Élisabeth as a child, by Pierre Gobert.

Louise Élisabeth was born on 22 November 1693, at the Palace of Versailles. As a member of the House of Bourbon-Condé, she was a princesse du sang. In youth, she was known at court as Mademoiselle de Charolais, a style later borne by her younger sister. Her parents' second daughter, and third child, she was one of nine children. She was baptised in the chapel of Versailles on 24 November 1698 with her brother Louis Henri and her sister Louise Anne.

=== Marriage ===
At the age of seventeen, it was suggested by her ambitious mother that she marry one of the king's grandsons, the young Duke of Berry. The marriage, however, did not take place due to the machinations of Louise Élisabeth's aunt, the Duchess of Orléans, who wanted the Duke for her own daughter, Marie Louise Élisabeth d'Orléans.

On 9 July 1713, Louise Élisabeth married her first cousin Louis Armand de Bourbon, Prince of Conti, at Versailles. Her husband, who was three years younger than his bride, had become the Prince of Conti in 1709 upon the early death of his father François Louis, Prince of Conti. His mother was the pious Marie Thérèse de Bourbon, eldest granddaughter of Le Grand Condé.

Her marriage was part of a double wedding between the Condé and Conti branches of the House of Bourbon; Louise Élisabeth's older brother Louis Henri de Bourbon married Mademoiselle de Conti, Marie Anne de Bourbon-Conti. The ceremony took place in the newly built Royal Chapel of Versailles.

Present at the wedding were her mother, paternal grandmother the Princess Palatine Anne, Dowager Princess of Condé; Charles, Duke of Berry, and his wife Marie Louise Élisabeth d'Orléans, her uncles Louis-Auguste de Bourbon, duc du Maine, Louis-Alexandre de Bourbon, comte de Toulouse and Philippe II, Duke of Orléans, as well as her aunts Françoise-Marie de Bourbon, Duchess of Orléans, and the two widowed Princesses of Conti, Marie Anne de Bourbon and Marie Thérèse de Bourbon.

In August 1716, at the age of twenty-two, Louise Élisabeth contracted smallpox from her husband, whom she had been nursing through his illness. A year later she gave birth to her first child. She and her husband had five children.

The Princess Palatine Elizabeth Charlotte, Duchess of Orléans (Madame), sister in law of Louis XIV and famous memoir writer, wrote of Louise Élisabeth c. 1719:

She is a person full of charms, and a striking proof that grace is preferable to beauty. When she chooses to make herself agreeable, it is impossible to resist her. Her manners are most fascinating; she is full of gentleness, never displaying the least ill-humour, and always saying something kind and obliging. It is greatly to be regretted that she is not in the society of more virtuous persons, for she is herself naturally very good; but she is spoiled by bad company. She has an ugly fool for her husband, who has been badly brought up; and the examples which are constantly before her eyes are so pernicious that they have corrupted her and made her careless of her reputation. Her amiable, unaffected manners are highly delightful to foreigners. Among others, some Bavarians have fallen in love with her, as well as the Prince Ragotzky; but she disgusted him with her coquetry.

..she does not love her husband, and cannot do so, no less on account of his ugly person than for his bad temper. It is not only his face that is hideous, but his whole person is frightful and deformed. She terrified him by placing some muskets and swords near her bed, and assuring him that if he came there again with his pistols charged, she would take the gun and fire upon him, and if she missed, she would fall upon him with the sword. Since this time he has left off carrying his pistols.

Louise Élisabeth had several extramarital affairs, such as her liaison with the handsome Philippe Charles de La Fare. These infidelities incensed her husband, whose jealousy made him turn physically violent against his wife. He is reported to have hurt his wife to the point that she had to see a doctor on two separate occasions. After a particularly dramatic scene in the Conti household, the princess refused to live with her husband anymore and took refuge with her mother. Later she fled to a convent. According to Saint-Simon, she once said of her husband:

he could not make a prince du sang without her, while she could make one without him.

The first years of her marriage were full of court cases at the Parlement of Paris against her husband due to his violent temper and her desire to leave him. In 1725, she consented to return to the Prince of Conti, who had her confined to the Château de l'Isle-Adam. She was able later, however, to convince him to allow her to return to Paris in order to give birth to her daughter, Louise Henriette. Her husband died a year later.

Due to his open support of the Scottish economist John Law who had implemented the introduction of paper money to France during the Régence of the young King Louis XV, her husband had made a fortune.

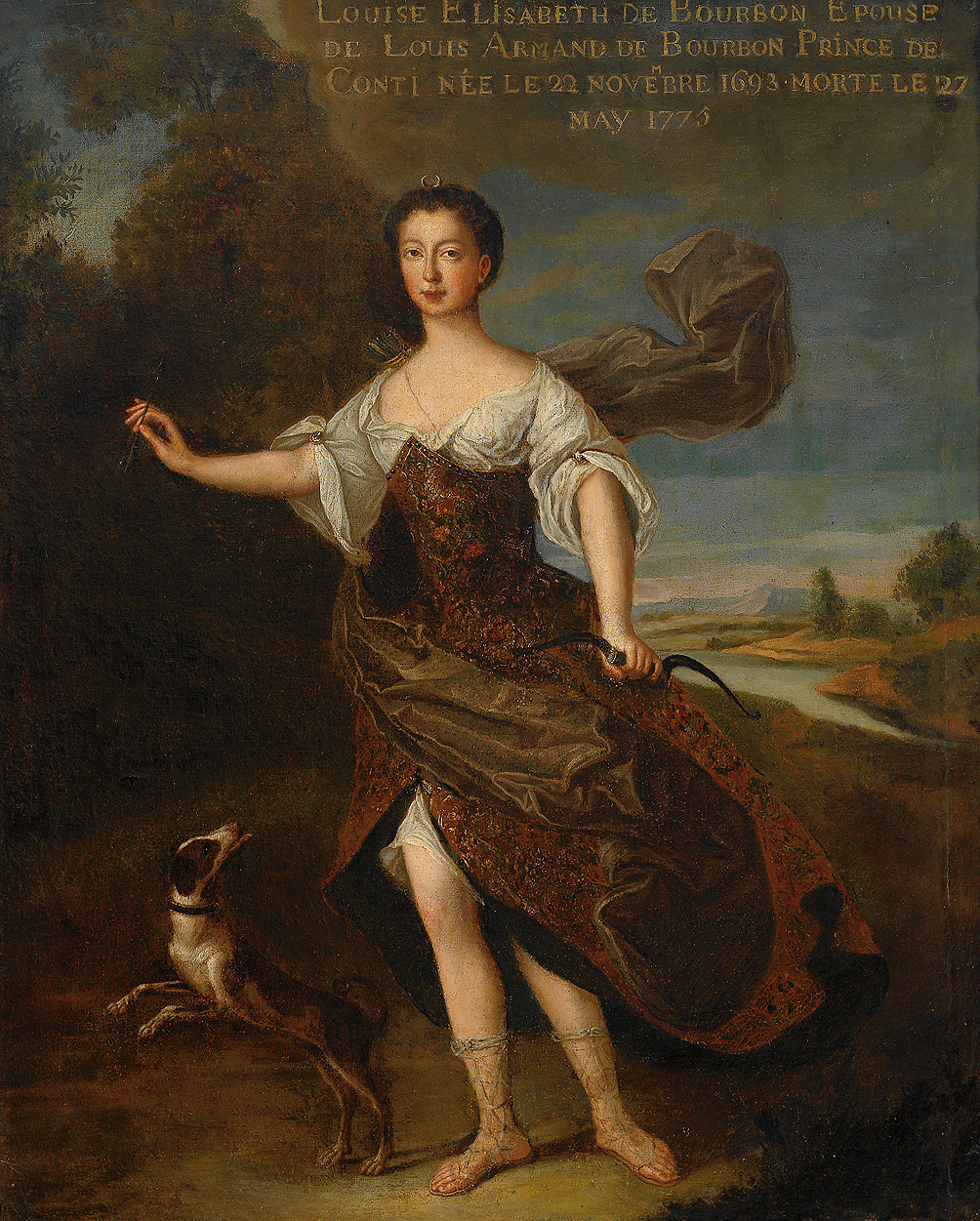
A posthumous painting of Louise Élisabeth

Her husband died in 1727 at the Hôtel de Conti (quai Conti) in Paris due to a "chest swelling". Louise Élisabeth was known at court either as Madame la Princesse de Conti troisième or Madame la Princesse de Conti dernière douairière, in order to distinguish Louise Élisabeth from the other two widowed princesses of Conti still alive:

- Marie Anne de Bourbon (1666–1739), the legitimised daughter of Louis XIV and Louise de La Vallière and wife of Louis Armand I de Bourbon, Prince of Conti. She was known as Madame la Princesse de Conti première douairière as she was the first to be widowed in 1685. Her husband's Conti title fell upon his younger brother, François de Bourbon, Prince of Conti.
- Marie Thérèse de Bourbon (1666–1732), the wife of François Louis de Bourbon, Prince of Conti and Louise Élisabeth's mother-in-law. She was known as Madame la Princesse de Conti seconde douairière after losing her husband in 1709.

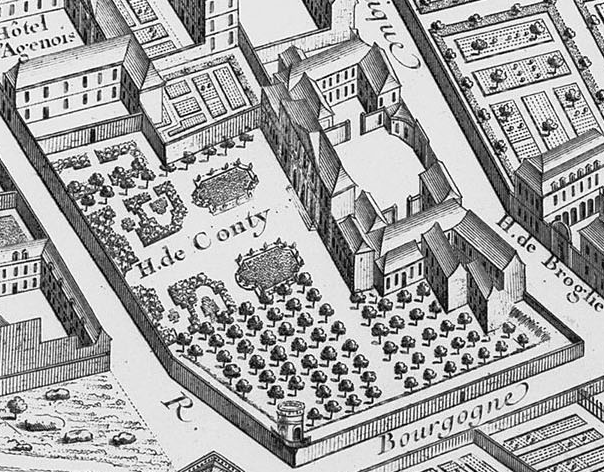
The Hôtel de Conti (rue Saint-Dominique) on the 1739 Turgot map of Paris

In 1733 Louise Élisabeth purchased a townhouse with an extensive garden on the rue Saint-Dominique in Paris from Françoise de Mailly (widow of Louis Phélypeaux, Marquis de La Vrillière), and hired the architect Nicolas Simonnet to redecorate the interiors. At that time it also became known as the Hôtel de Conti. It is shown on the 1739 Turgot map of Paris as "H. de Conty".

The Dowager Princess and her aunt the Dowager Duchess of Orléans joined forces in 1743 to arrange the marriage of her son to her first cousin, Louise Diane d'Orléans, and that of her daughter to Louise Diane's nephew, the heir to the House of Orléans. This helped to somewhat smooth over the century-long feud between the House of Condé and House of Orléans, a feud fueled by the animosity between Louise Élisabeth's mother and aunt, the Princess of Condé and the Duchess of Orléans, both legitimised daughters of Louis XIV and Madame de Montespan.

After the death of her mother in June 1743, she acquired the château de Louveciennes, which later reverted to the Crown. Louis XV in turn gave it to the successor of Madame de Pompadour, Madame du Barry. The Dowager Princess of Conti later also acquired the château de Voisins.

Later, in 1746, the Dowager Princess was asked by Louis XV to present his new mistress, the future Madame de Pompadour, at court. She attended the ball at Versailles in honour of the marriage of Infanta Maria Teresa Rafaela of Spain to Louis, Dauphin of France in 1745. According to Nancy Mitford's Madame de Pompadour book, the proud Dowager Princess was annoyed at no one recognising her. She obliged the king in the hope that he would help her escape her debts, a tactic which worked.

Just before her death, the princess gave her townhouse on the rue Saint-Dominique to her grandson, Louis François Joseph, Comte de La Marche, and she died there at the age of eighty-one, on 27 May 1775. She was buried at the Église Saint-Sulpice in Paris.

== Issue ==
Name	Portrait	Lifespan	Notes
Louis de Bourbon, Count of La Marche		28 March 1715 - 1 August 1717	Born in Paris, he died in infancy;
Louis François I de Bourbon, prince de Conti		13 August 1717 - 2 August 1776	Born in Paris, he was the heir to the Conti titles and lands. Husband of Louise Diane d'Orléans; had issue;
Louis Armand de Bourbon, Duke of Mercœur		19 August 1720- 13 May 1722	Born in Paris, he died in infancy;
Charles de Bourbon, Count of Alais		5 February 1722- 7 August 1730	Born in Paris, he died in infancy;
Louise Henriette de Bourbon, Duchess of Orléans		20 June 1726 – 9 February 1759	Born in Paris, she was Louise Élisabeth's only daughter; known as Mademoiselle de Conti in her youth, she married Louis Philippe d'Orléans, Duke of Chartres at Versailles in 1743; she had issue and was the mother of Philippe Égalité and Bathilde d'Orléans, the last princesse de Condé.

== Ancestry ==
Ancestors of Louise Élisabeth de Bourbon

16. Henri II, Prince of Condé
8. Louis II, Prince of Condé
17. Charlotte Marguerite de Montmorency
4. Henri Jules, Prince of Condé
18. Urbain de Maillé, marquis de Brézé
9. Claire-Clémence de Maillé-Brézé
19. Nicole du Plessis de Richelieu
2. Louis III, Prince of Condé
20. Frederick V, Elector Palatine
10. Edward, Count Palatine of Simmern
21. Elizabeth Stuart
5. Anne Henriette of Bavaria
22. Charles Gonzaga, Duke of Mantua and Montferrat
11. Anne Gonzaga
23. Catherine of Mayenne
1. Louise Élisabeth de Bourbon
24. Henry IV of France
12. Louis XIII of France
25. Marie de' Medici
6. Louis XIV of France
26. Philip III of Spain and II of Portugal
13. Anne of Austria
27. Margaret of Austria
3. Louise Françoise de Bourbon
28. Gaspard de Rochechouart, marquis de Mortemart
14. Gabriel de Rochechouart, duc de Mortemart
29. Louise de Maure, comtesse de Maure
7. Madame de Montespan
30. Jean de Grandseigne, marquis de Marsillac
15. Diane de Grandseigne
31. Catherine de La Béraudière, dame de Villenon

Louise Élisabeth de Bourbon House of Bourbon-Condé Born: 22 November 1693 Died: 27 May 1775
French nobility
Preceded by Vacant; Anne Louise Bénédicte de Bourbon	Mademoiselle de Charolais; 1693–1713	Succeeded by Louise Anne de Bourbon
Preceded by Louis Henri de Bourbon, Prince of Condé	Countess of Sancerre; 27 January 1740– 27 May 1775	Succeeded by Sahuguet Family
Preceded by Marie Anne de Bourbon	Duchess of Étampes; 1718–1752	Succeeded by Louise Henriette de Bourbon
Preceded by Vacant; Marie Thérèse de Bourbon	Princess of Conti; 1713–1775	Succeeded by Vacant; Louise Diane d'Orléans
