= Hôtel du Plessis-Guénégaud =

Demolished townhouse in Paris

Coordinates: 48°51′28″N 2°20′05″E

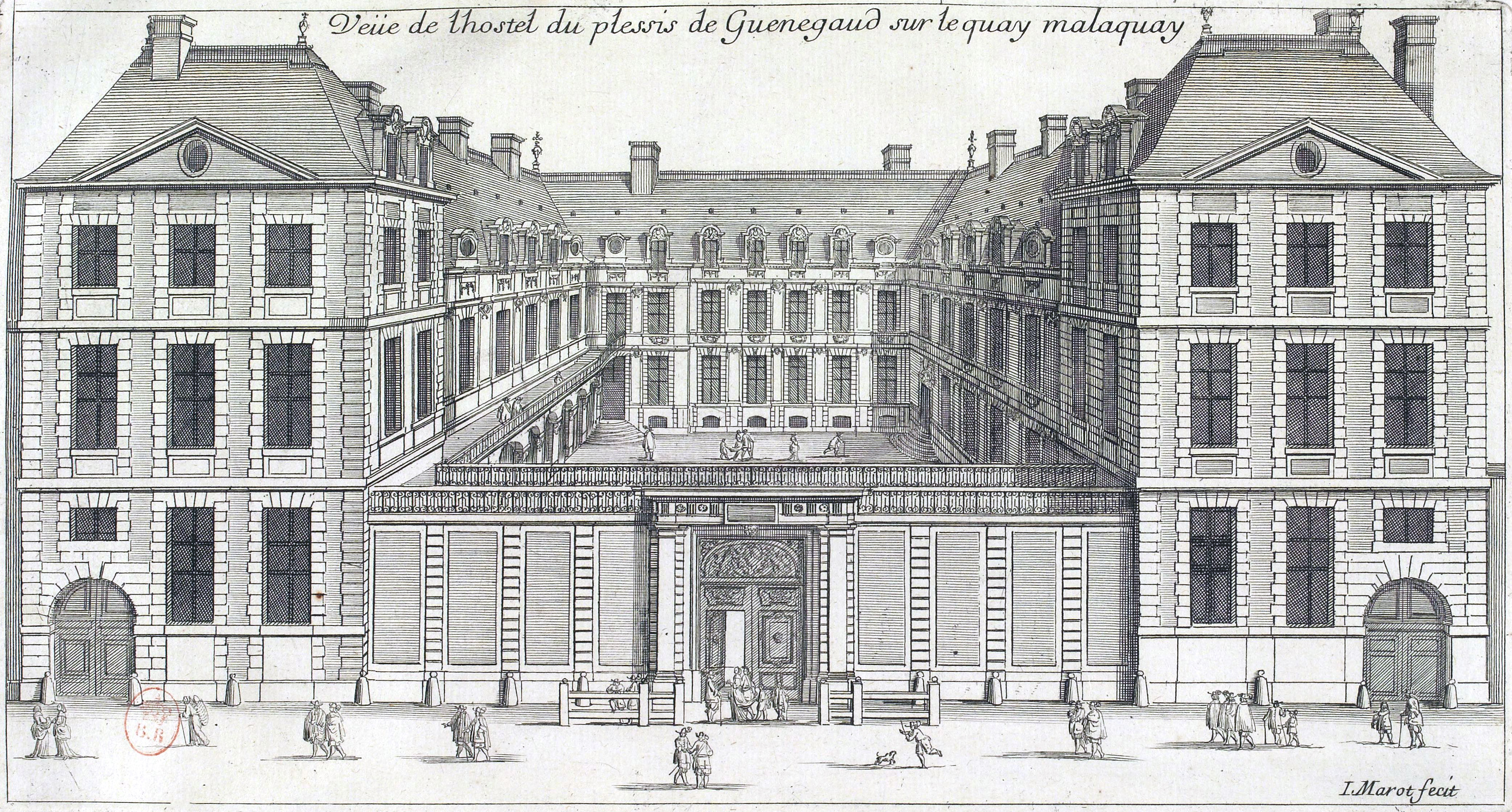
Hôtel du Plessis-Guénégaud, engraved by Jean Marot

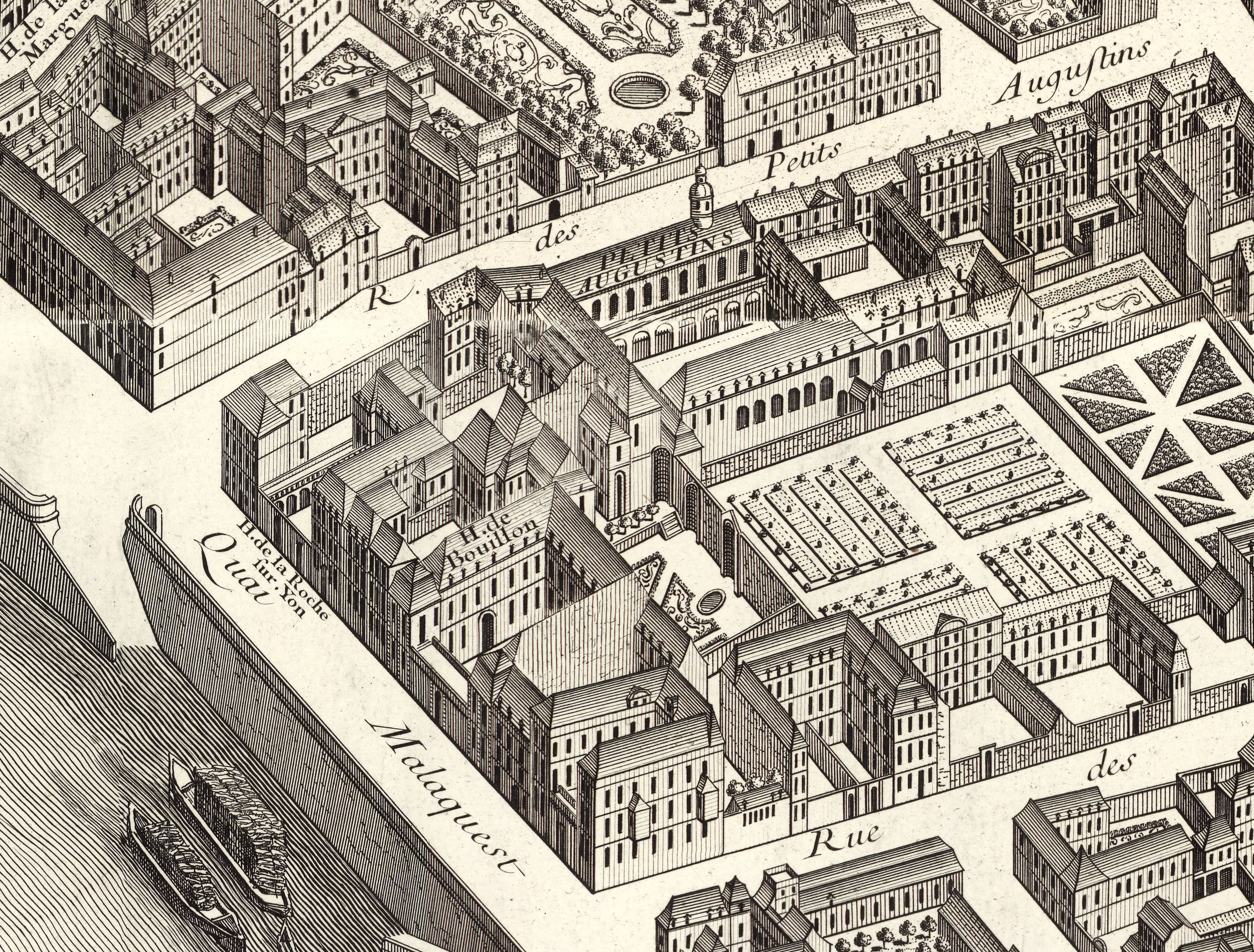
The Hôtel de La Roche-sur-Yon on the Turgot map of Paris, published in 1739, when the hôtel was owned by Mademoiselle de La Roche-sur-Yon

The Hôtel du Plessis-Guénégaud (French pronunciation: [otɛl dy plɛsi ɡeneɡo]) was a French aristocratic townhouse (hôtel particulier), built 1630–1632 for the financier Louis Le Barbier to the designs of architect Clément Métezeau. It was located at what is now 13 Quai Malaquais in the 6th arrondissement of Paris. The hôtel was demolished in 1843.

== Names ==
The site had been owned from 1628 by Auguste de Loménie, Sieur de la Ville-aux-Clercs, who had become the Count of Brienne from his marriage in 1623 to Louise de Béon. His hôtel is shown as Hôtel de Brienne on the 1652 Gomboust map of Paris. Subsequently it was known by other names, including Hôtel de Conti (1660–1670), Hôtel du Plessis-Guénégaud (1670–1680, engraved by Jean Marot), Hôtel de Créquy (1680–1712), Hôtel de Lauzun (1712–1733), Hôtel de La Roche-sur-Yon (on the 1739 Turgot map of Paris), and Hôtel Mazarin (during the reign of Louis XVI). It became the property of the state during the French Revolution but in 1818 was returned to its former owners, who demolished it in 1843. The property was acquired by the École des Beaux-Arts in 1858, and Félix Duban began construction of the Bâtiment des Expositions, which was completed in 1862.

== Hôtel de Conti ==
In 1660, Anne-Marie Martinozzi, Princesse de Conti, who was a niece of Cardinal Mazarin, acquired the hôtel, which then became known as the Hôtel de Conti. Two of her sons, Louis Armand de Bourbon (1661–1685) and François Louis de Bourbon (1664–1709), were born in it. In 1670 she exchanged this hôtel, as well as her beautiful country house in Bouchet, for the Hôtel de Guénégaud on the Quai de Nevers, only a short distance upstream. After the exchange, this house on the Quai Malaquais became the Hôtel du Plessis-Guénégaud, and her new house became the Hôtel de Conti. The Quai de Nevers was renamed Quai de Conti.

== See also ==
- Hôtel de Conti

== Bibliography ==
- Ayers, Andrew (2004). The Architecture of Paris. Stuttgart; London: Edition Axel Menges. ISBN 9783930698967.
- Berty, Adolphe; L.-M. Tisserand (1876). Topographie historique du vieux Paris: Région du Bourg Saint-Germain, [Vol. 3]. Paris: Imprimerie Nationale. Title page at Gallica.
- Deutsch, Kristina (2015). Jean Marot : Un graveur d'architecture à l'époque de Louis XIV. Berlin: De Gruyter. ISBN 9783110375954.
- Dumolin, Maurice (1929). Études de topographie parisienne, vol. 1. Paris. OCLC 1101322568.
- Gady, Alexandre (2008). Les Hôtels particuliers de Paris du Moyen Âge à la Belle Époque. Paris: Parigramme. ISBN 9782840962137.
- Mauban, André (1944). Jean Marot: Architecte et Graveur Parisien. Paris: Les Éditions d'Art et d'Histoire. OCLC 7057275.
