= François Louis, Prince of Conti =

François Louis de Bourbon
- King of Poland & Grand Duke of Lithuania (titular)
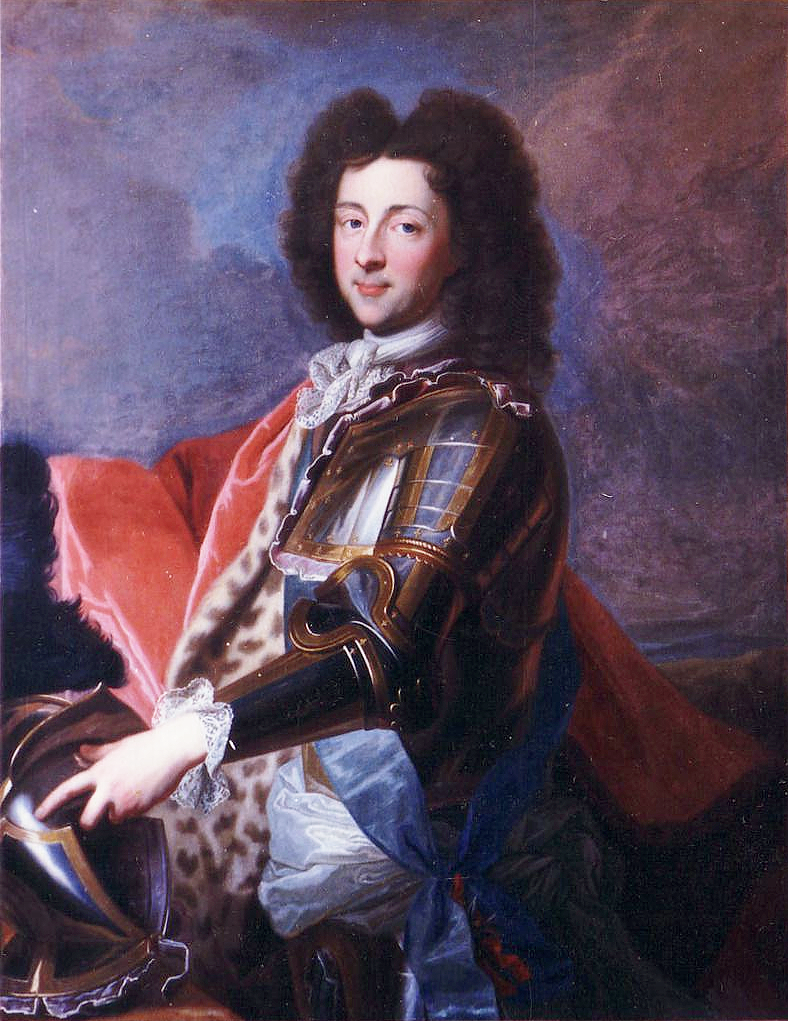

Prince of Conti
- Reign: 9 November 1685 – 22 February 1709
- Predecessor: Louis Armand
- Successor: Louis Armand II
- Born: 30 April 1664; Hôtel de Conti (quai Malaquais), Paris, Kingdom of France
- Died: 22 February 1709 (aged 44); Hôtel de Conti (quai Conti), Paris, Kingdom of France
- Burial: L'Isle-Adam
- Spouse: Marie Thérèse de Bourbon
- Issue: Marie Anne, Princess of Condé; Louis Armand II, Prince of Conti; Louise Adélaïde de Bourbon
- House: Bourbon-Conti
- Father: Armand, Prince of Conti
- Mother: Anne Marie Martinozzi
- Religion: Roman Catholicism
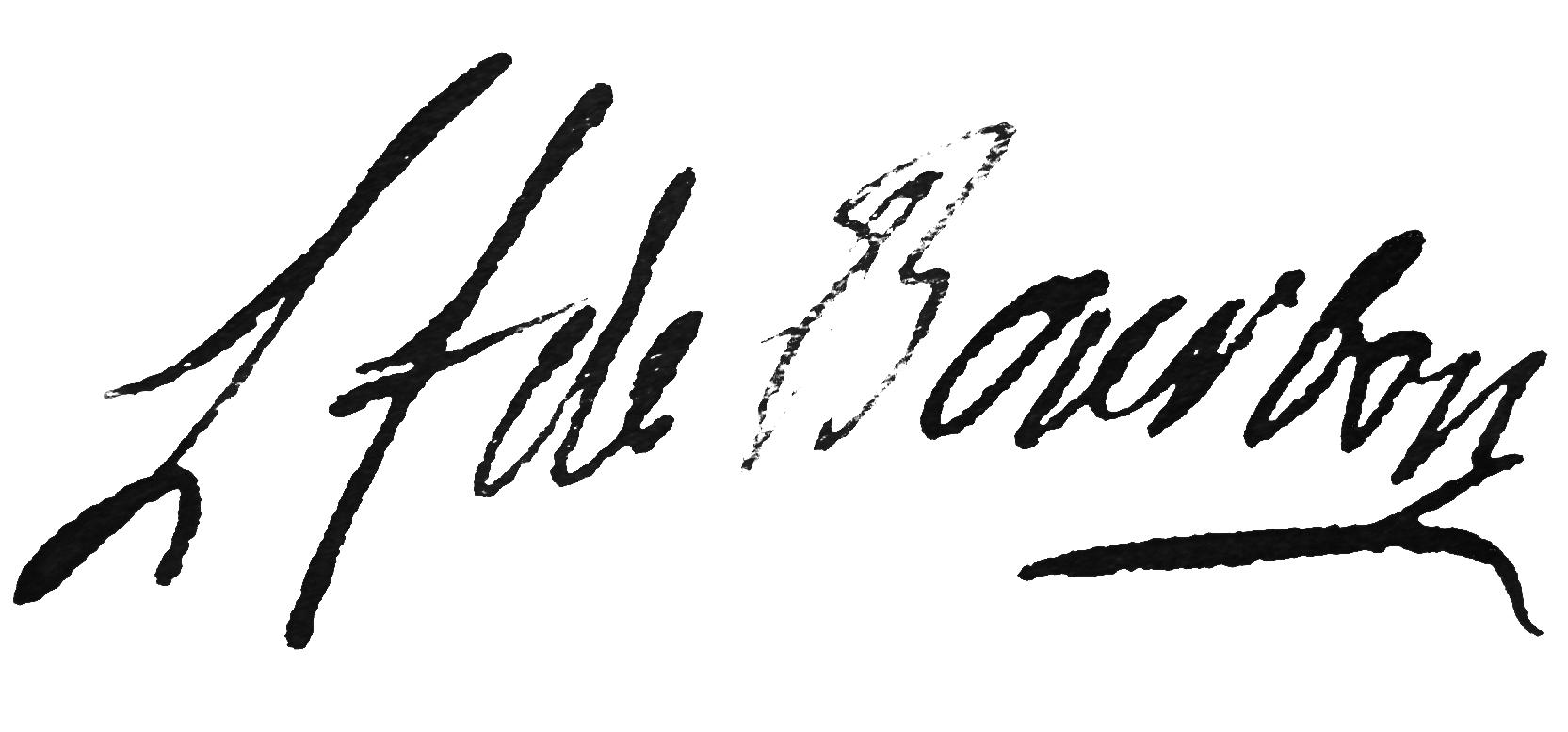
- Signature

François Louis de Bourbon, le Grand Conti (30 April 1664 – 22 February 1709), was a French nobleman who held the title Prince de Conti, succeeding his brother, Louis Armand de Bourbon, in 1685. Until this date, he used the title of Prince of La Roche-sur-Yon. He was proclaimed as the King of Poland in 1697. He is the most famous member of the Conti family, a cadet branch of the Princes of Condé. As a member of the reigning House of Bourbon, he was a prince du sang.

== Biography ==
=== Early life ===
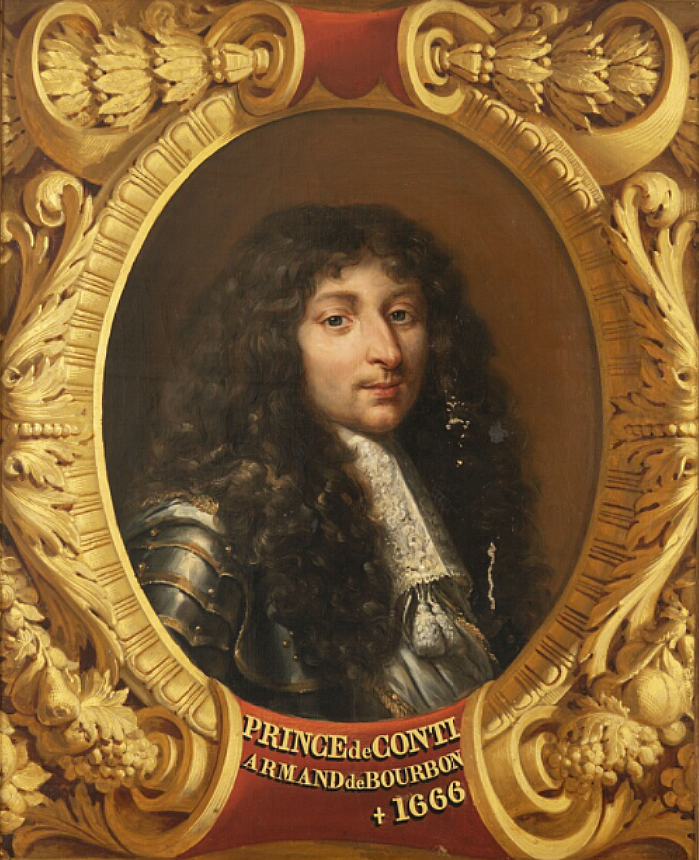
François Louis's father Armand de Bourbon

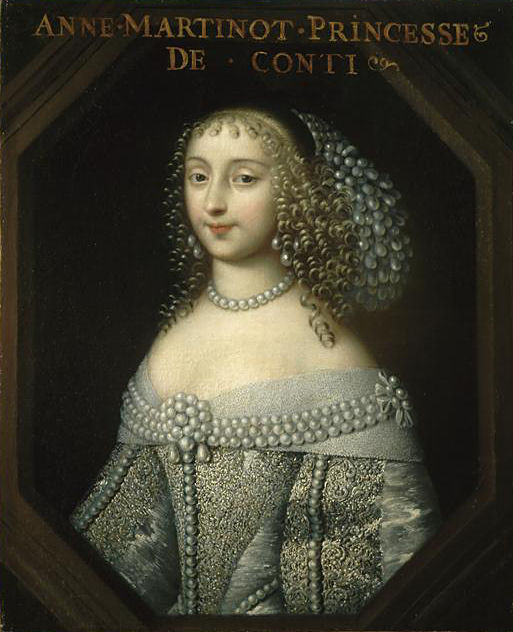
François Louis's mother Anne Marie Martinozzi

Coat of Arms of François Louis de Bourbon, Prince of Conti

Born at the Hôtel de Conti (quai Malaquais) in Paris, François was the son of Armand de Bourbon, Prince of Conti and Anne Marie Martinozzi, daughter of Girolamo Martinozzi and niece of Cardinal Mazarin, through her mother. He had one older brother, Louis Armand I, Prince of Conti (1661–1685), who married Marie Anne de Bourbon, the illegitimate daughter of King Louis XIV and his mistress, Louise de La Vallière.

Conti's mother, Anne Marie Martinozzi was one of the Mazarinettes, nieces of the powerful Cardinal Mazarin. Conti's mother was described as being possessed of a beautiful appearance, blonde hair, a sweet temper, generous, with a lot of wit and intelligence.

Conti's father on the other hand, although seen as intelligent, suffered from a deformity and was considered something of a cypher. Having a reputation for vacillating between debauchery and extreme piousness, his strange behaviour was noted by his contemporaries.

His father died in 1666 from syphilis when Conti was just two years old. Its possible that he passed down the disease to his son Francois. Conti's mother died when he was eight years old from an apoplexy.

In his parents respective wills, they entrusted their two now orphaned sons to the care of the Duchess of Longueville, their paternal aunt, and the guardianship of the two boys to their uncle the Grand Condé. The Grand Condé despite his enmity against Conti's father, would become particularly attached to François-Louis and make him his protégé hoping to groom him for military life. Louis-Francois cousin, and son of the Grand Condé, Henri Jules was not given to such pursuits and mentally unstable.

François-Louis and his brother were educated by Claude Fleury alongside the Dauphin Louis de Bourbon. Fleury remarked that François-Louis could not sit still, but that this was natural for his age and that nevertheless he had a good memory and remembered what he was taught.

François-Louis also had an Italian valet, who accompanied him throughout his education, and as a result he “spoke Italian almost as if it was his natural language".

=== Banishment from court ===
In 1682, Conti and several other young men at the highest levels of the French aristocracy were involved in a scandal, when it was discovered that they had formed a society dedicated to the "italian vice".

Among the other members were the Comte de Vermandois (the king's son), Prince de Turenne, son of the Duke of Bouillon and Anne Marie Mancini, the Chevalier de Sainte-Maure (ménin to the Dauphin), the Chevalier de Mailly, the Comte de Roucy, Marquise de Créquy, son of Marechal de Créquy, and the Comte de Marsan, the brother of Philippe, Chevalier de Lorraine, who was himself the lover of the king's brother the Duke of Orléans. This led to Conti being banished from court to Chantilly, where his uncle, the Grand Condé, could keep a watchful eye over him.

=== Military career ===
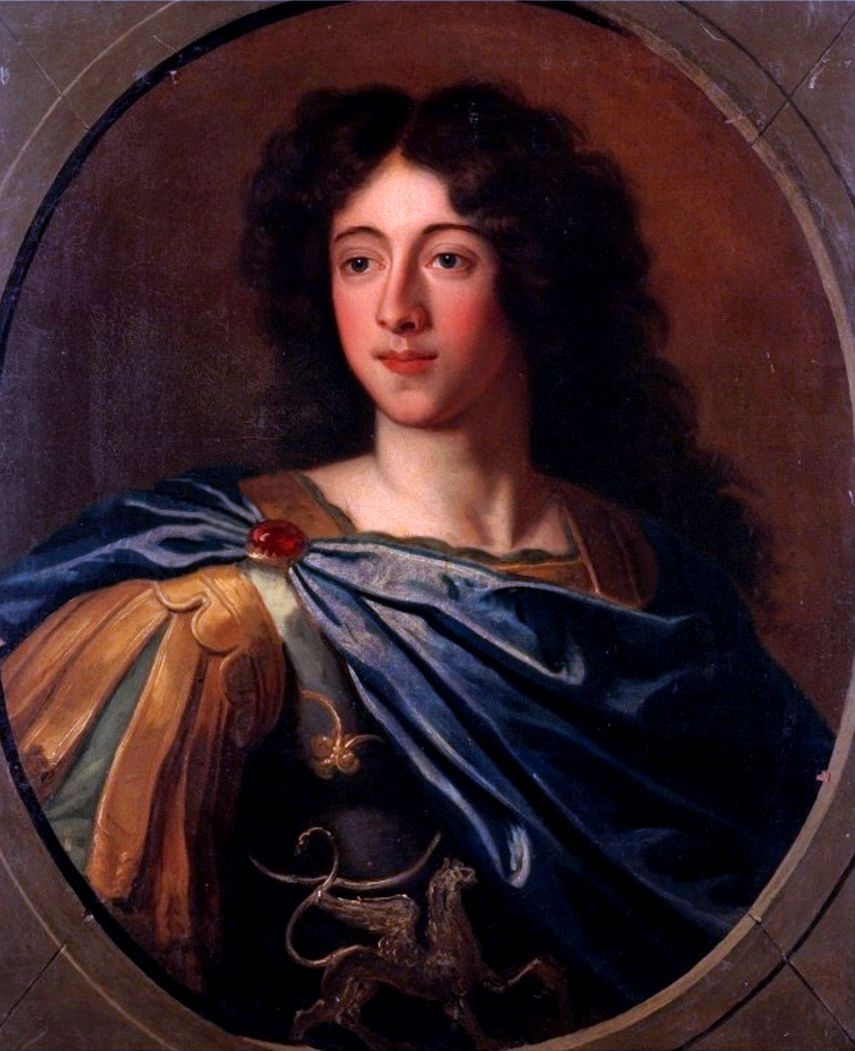
Portrait of François Louis by an unknown artist, second half of the 17th century

In 1683, Conti assisted the Imperialists in Hungary, and while there, he wrote some letters in which he referred to King Louis XIV as le roi du théâtre; because of this, and because of an early engagement at the side of the Turks, in 1685, on his return to France, he was temporarily banished to Chantilly.

=== Candidacy for throne of Poland-Lithuania ===

Polish-Lithuanian coat of arms for François Louis, granted by Louis XIV of France

In 1697, Conti was put forward as a candidate in the Polish–Lithuanian royal election of that year, eventually being elected King of Poland and Grand Duke of Lithuania, but was forced to concede after Augustus the Strong, the Elector of Saxony, sent an army to force Conti from his headquarters in Oliwa.

== Marriage ==
Conti was the protégé of his uncle, Louis de Bourbon, le Grand Condé, whose granddaughter, Marie Thérèse de Bourbon (1666–1732), he married at the Palace of Versailles on 22 January 1688, before the assembled court. Marie Thérése along with her sisters were called "dolls of the blood" (French: les poupées du sang) because of their small stature.

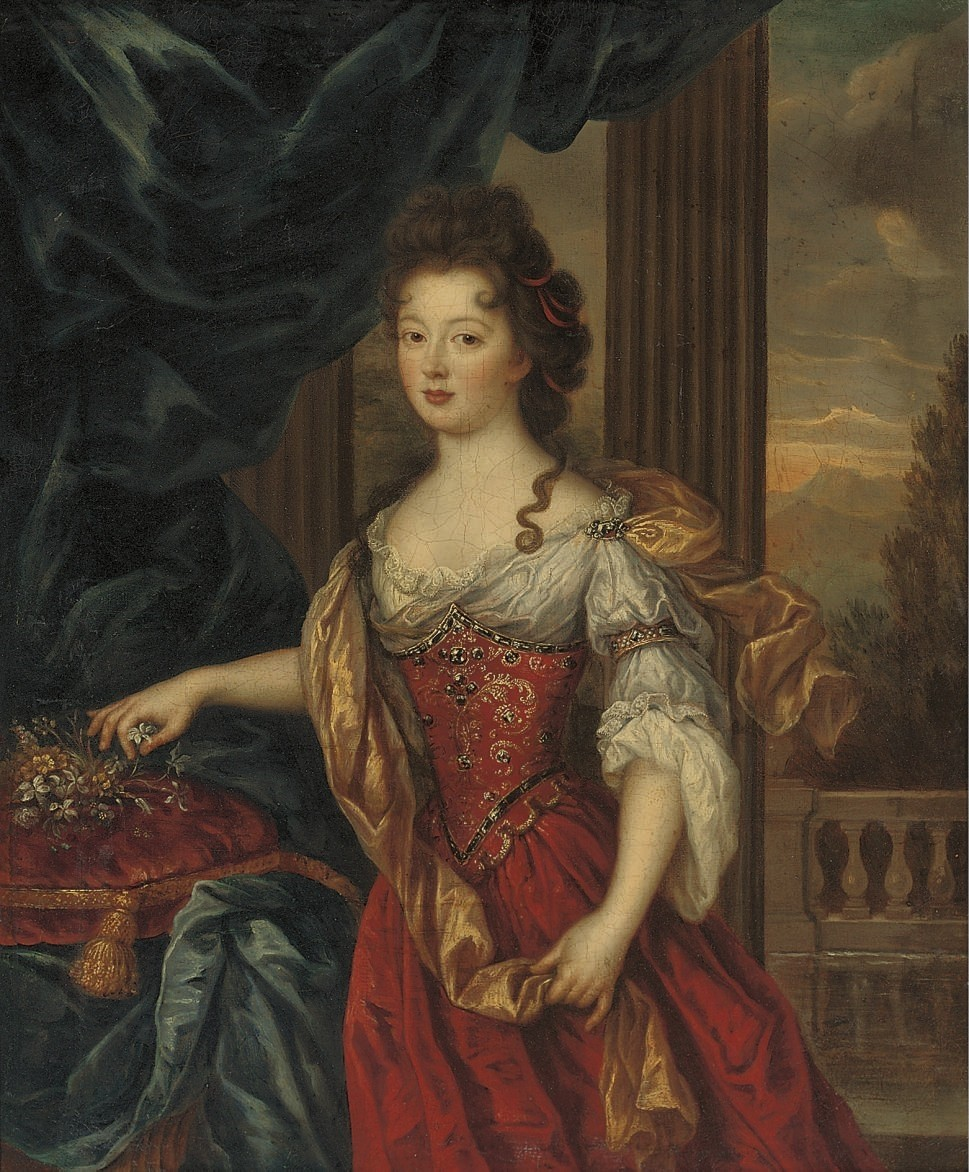
Portrait of François Louis's wife Marie Thérèse de Bourbon (painted by the Circle of Pierre Mignard)

The bride was passionately in love with her husband, and although the couple would go on to have seven children, his attentions were focused elsewhere. It was well known at court that he was in love with his wife's sister-in-law, Louise-Françoise de Bourbon, wife of Louis III, Prince of Condé, who was the eldest legitimated daughter of King Louis XIV and his mistress, Madame de Montespan. Marie Anne de Bourbon, the daughter of Louise-Françoise de Bourbon, was thought to have been the fruit of this affair. It was also noted, however, that he had homosexual tendencies and did not pay his wife much attention. He lived as a libertine, engaging in numerous love affairs with members of both sexes. His scandalous philandering and debaucheries caused tension and distance within the family, and earned him the nickname of le Grand Conti.

He served in the French army, but he never managed to achieve a rank higher than lieutenant-general. In 1689, he accompanied his intimate friend, François Henri de Montmorency, duc de Luxembourg, to the Netherlands, and shared in the French victories at Fleurus, Steinkirk, and Neerwinden. On the death of his cousin, Jean Louis d'Orléans, Duke of Longueville (1646–1694), and in accordance to his will, Conti claimed the Principality of Neuchâtel against Marie d'Orleans-Longueville, Duchess de Nemours (1625–1707), a sister of the Duke.

He failed to obtain military assistance from the Swiss, and by the King's command, yielded the disputed territory to Marie d'Orleans, although the courts of law had decided in his favour. In 1697, King Louis XIV offered him the Polish crown, and by means of bribes, the Abbé de Polignac secured his election. On 27 June 1697, he was formally proclaimed as the King of Poland by Cardinal Radziejowski.

Conti started rather unwillingly for his new kingdom, probably, as the Duke of Saint-Simon remarks, owing to his affection for Louise-Françoise de Bourbon. He departed on the Railleuse, under Captain Jean Bart, on 6 September 1697.

When he reached Danzig, he found his rival Augustus II, Elector of Saxony, already in possession of the Polish crown. Conti returned to France, where he was graciously received by King Louis XIV, although Saint-Simon says the King was vexed to see him again. But the misfortunes of the French armies, during the earlier years of the War of the Spanish Succession, compelled the King to appoint Conti, whose military renown stood very high, to command the troops in Italy.

On 4 February 1699, Conti purchased the Château d'Issy, a small French Baroque château on the outskirts of Paris, bought for the sum of 140,000 livres. The estate remained the property of the Princes of Conti until the Revolution of 1789, when it was confiscated as biens nationaux.

== Death ==
The Prince of Conti fell ill and died on 22 February 1709 at the Hôtel de Conti (quai Conti), his death calling forth exceptional signs of mourning from all classes. He died from a combination of gout and syphilis. He was buried alongside his mother at his estate in L'Isle-Adam, Val-d'Oise, near Paris.

He was succeeded as Prince de Conti by his eldest son, Louis Armand II de Bourbon.

== Issue ==
Conti married Marie Thérèse de Bourbon, aged 22, who was the daughter of Henri Jules, Prince of Condé and Princess Anne Henriette of the Palatinate. They had the following seven children together:

- Marie Anne de Bourbon (18 April 1689 - 21 March 1720), married Louis Henri I, Prince of Condé, but had no issue.
- Prince of La Roche-sur-Yon (18 November 1693 - 22 November 1693), died in infancy.
- Prince of La Roche-sur-Yon (1 December 1694 - 25 April 1698), died in infancy.
- Louis Armand II, Prince of Conti (10 November 1695 - 4 May 1727), married Louise Élisabeth de Bourbon, daughter of Louis III, Prince of Condé, and had issue.
- Louise Adélaïde de Bourbon (2 November 1696 – 20 November 1750), died unmarried but had many illegitimate children.
- Mademoiselle d'Alais (19 November 1697 - 13 August 1699), died in infancy.
- Louis François de Bourbon, Count of Alais (27 July 1703 - 21 January 1704), died in infancy.

== Ancestry ==
Ancestors of François Louis, Prince of Conti

8. Henri I, Prince of Condé
4. Henri II, Prince of Condé
9. Charlotte Catherine de La Trémoille
2. Armand, Prince of Conti
10. Henri I, duc de Montmorency
5. Charlotte Marguerite de Montmorency
11. Louise de Budos
1. François Louis de Bourbon
12. Vincenzo Martinozzi
6. Girolamo Martinozzi
13. Margherita Marcolini
3. Anne Marie Martinozzi
14. Pietro Mazzarini
7. Laura Margherita Mazzarini
15. Ortensia Buffalini

== Sources ==
- Mansel, Philip (2020). King of the World: The Life of Louis XIV. University of Chicago Press. ISBN 9780226690926.

François Louis, Prince of Conti House of Bourbon Born: 30 April 1664 Died: 22 February 1709
French nobility
Preceded by Louis Armand de Bourbon	Prince of Conti; 9 November 1685 – 22 February 1709	Succeeded by Louis Armand de Bourbon
