= Princes of Conti =

French noble title

Coat of arms of the Princes of Conti

Prince of Conti (French: prince de Conti) was a French noble title, assumed by a cadet branch of the princely house of Bourbon-Condé.

== History ==
The title derives its name from Conty, a small town in northern France, c. 35 km southwest of Amiens, which came into the Bourbon-Condé family by the marriage of Louis de Bourbon, first Prince of Condé, with Eleanor de Roye in 1551.

François de Bourbon (1558–1614), the third son of this marriage, was given the title of marquis de Conti and was later elevated to the rank of prince de Conti. He died in 1614 and the title lapsed, since his only child had predeceased him in 1610.

In 1629, the title of Prince of Conti was revived in favor of Armand de Bourbon (1629–1666), second son of Henry II, Prince of Condé, and brother of Louis, the Grand Condé. During the time that the House of Bourbon ruled France, from the reign of King Henry IV of France to the reign of King Louis-Philippe of the French, the Princes of Conti were considered to be princes du sang in the Kingdom of France. The holders of this title used the style of Serene Highness.

== Marquis and Princes of Conti ==
- 1558-1614: marquis, then from 1581 onwards 1st prince François de Bourbon

At his death, the title was not passed on, for want of direct descendants. The title was bestowed in 1629 upon:

- 1629-1666 : 2nd prince Armand
- 1666-1685 : 3rd prince Louis Armand I
- 1685-1709 : 4th prince François Louis
- 1709-1727 : 5th prince Louis Armand II
- 1727-1776 : 6th prince Louis François I
- 1776-1814 : 7th prince Louis François II

At his death, the title was not passed on, for want of legitimate descendants.

== Family tree ==
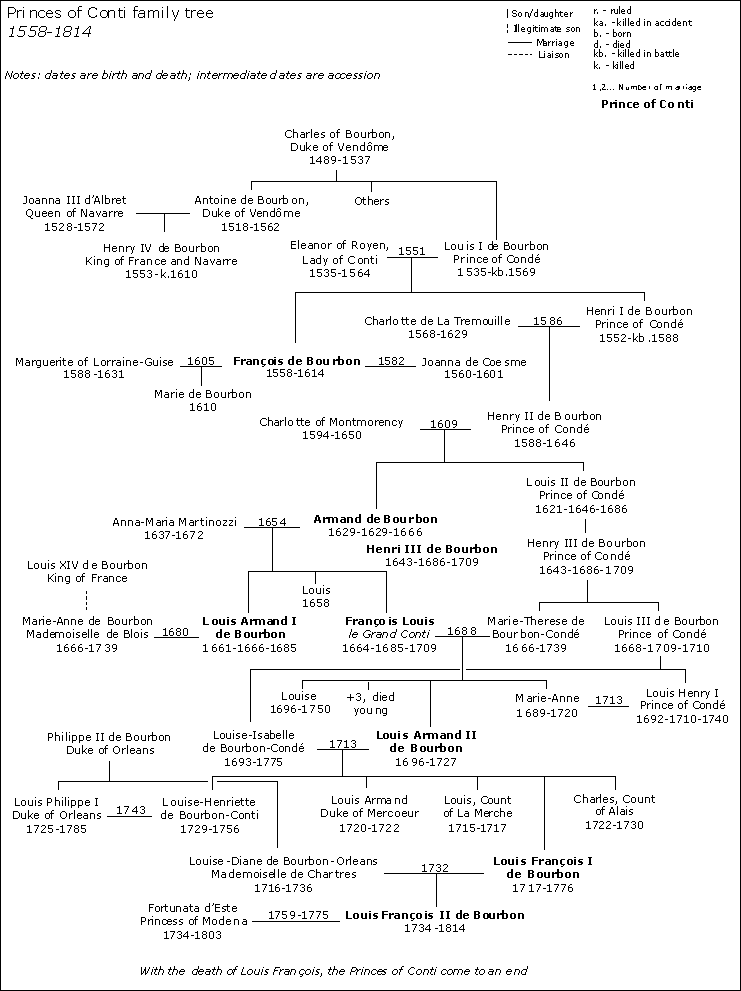

== See also ==
- Princess of Conti
- Château de L'Isle-Adam
- Hôtel de Conti (quai Malaquais) (1660–1670)
- Hôtel de Conti (quai Conti) (1670–1749)
- Hôtel de Conti (rue Saint-Dominique) (1733–1776)
