= Louis Armand II, Prince of Conti =

Prince of Conti from 1709 to 1727

Louis Armand II de Bourbon
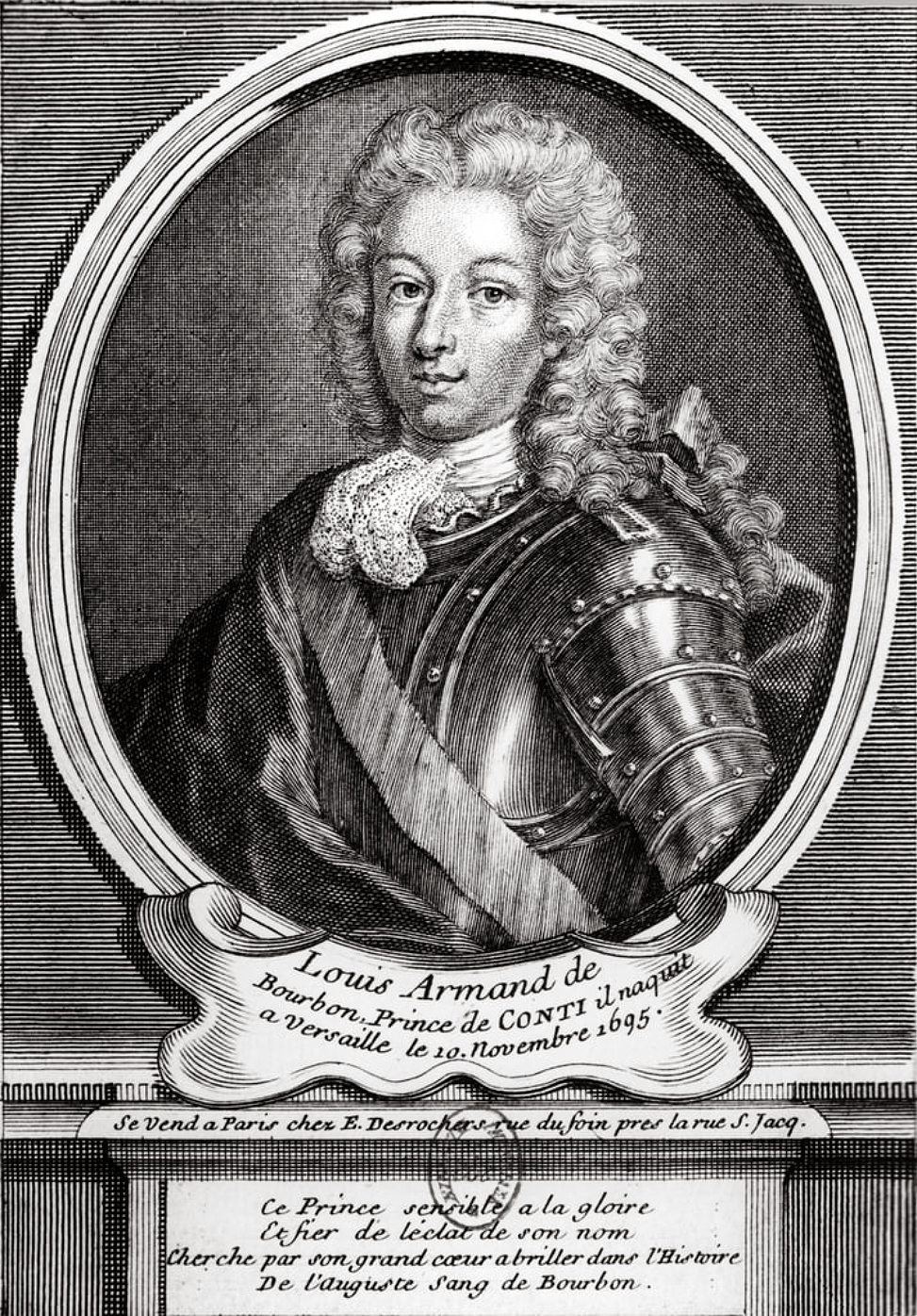

Prince of Conti
- Reign: 22 February 1709 – 4 May 1727
- Predecessor: François Louis
- Successor: Louis François
- Born: 10 November 1695; Palace of Versailles, Versailles, France
- Died: 5 April 1727 (aged 31); Hôtel de Conti (quai Conti), Paris, France
- Spouse: Louise Élisabeth de Bourbon
- Issue Detail: Louis François, Prince of Conti; Louise Henriette, Duchess of Orléans
Names
- Louis Armand de Bourbon
- House: Bourbon-Conti
- Father: François Louis, Prince of Conti
- Mother: Marie Thérèse de Bourbon

Louis Armand de Bourbon (10 November 1695 – 4 May 1727) was Prince of Conti from 1709 to his death, succeeding his father, François Louis de Bourbon. As a member of the reigning House of Bourbon, he was a Prince du Sang. His mother was Marie Thérèse de Bourbon, daughter of Henri Jules, Prince of Condé and granddaughter of Louis de Bourbon, le Grand Condé. He was nominated as the Prince of Orange by King Louis XIV of France in 1712.

His male line descendants died out in 1814; through his daughter, however, he is an ancestor of the present-day pretenders to the throne of France and Italy, the kings of Spain and Belgium and the Grand Duke of Luxembourg.

== Biography ==
Born at the Palace of Versailles, he was one of seven children born of his parents, and their only son to live past the age of 5. Due to him being her sole surviving son, Louis Armand was the favorite child of his mother, who doted on him.

At the age of 8, on 30 June 1704, he was baptised. Held at Versailles, King Louis XIV had Mary of Modena as the guest of honour at the ceremony; Mary was the widow of the exiled King James II of England and Louis Armands cousin once removed, as Mary's mother Laura Martinozzi was the sister of Louis Armands grand-mother Anne-Marie Martinozzi.

At the age of 13 his father died in Paris (22 February 1709) and Louis Armand succeeded to the Conti title and wealth, although there was no real principality. On 1 January 1711, Louis Armand was made a knight of the Order of the Holy Spirit.

On 9 July 1713, Louis Armand married his maternal first cousin, Louise Élisabeth de Bourbon, known as Mademoiselle de Bourbon. Another proposed bride was her sister, Louise Anne de Bourbon. Louise Élisabeth was the daughter of Louis III, Prince of Condé and Louise-Françoise de Bourbon, a legitimised daughter of King Louis XIV and his famous mistress, Madame de Montespan.

The event also took place at Versailles and was part of a double marriage; on the same day, his oldest sister, Marie Anne de Bourbon, married Louis Henri I, Prince of Condé, known as the Duke of Bourbon.

In the end, Louise Élisabeth's brother Charles, Count of Charolais, even proposed to Charlotte Aglaé, who is said to have considered the proposal but refused. Charlotte Aglaé herself married the Duke of Modena in 1720, in the presence of Louis Armand and Louis Élisabeth.

The marriage of Louis Armand and Louise Élisabeth would later become stormy.

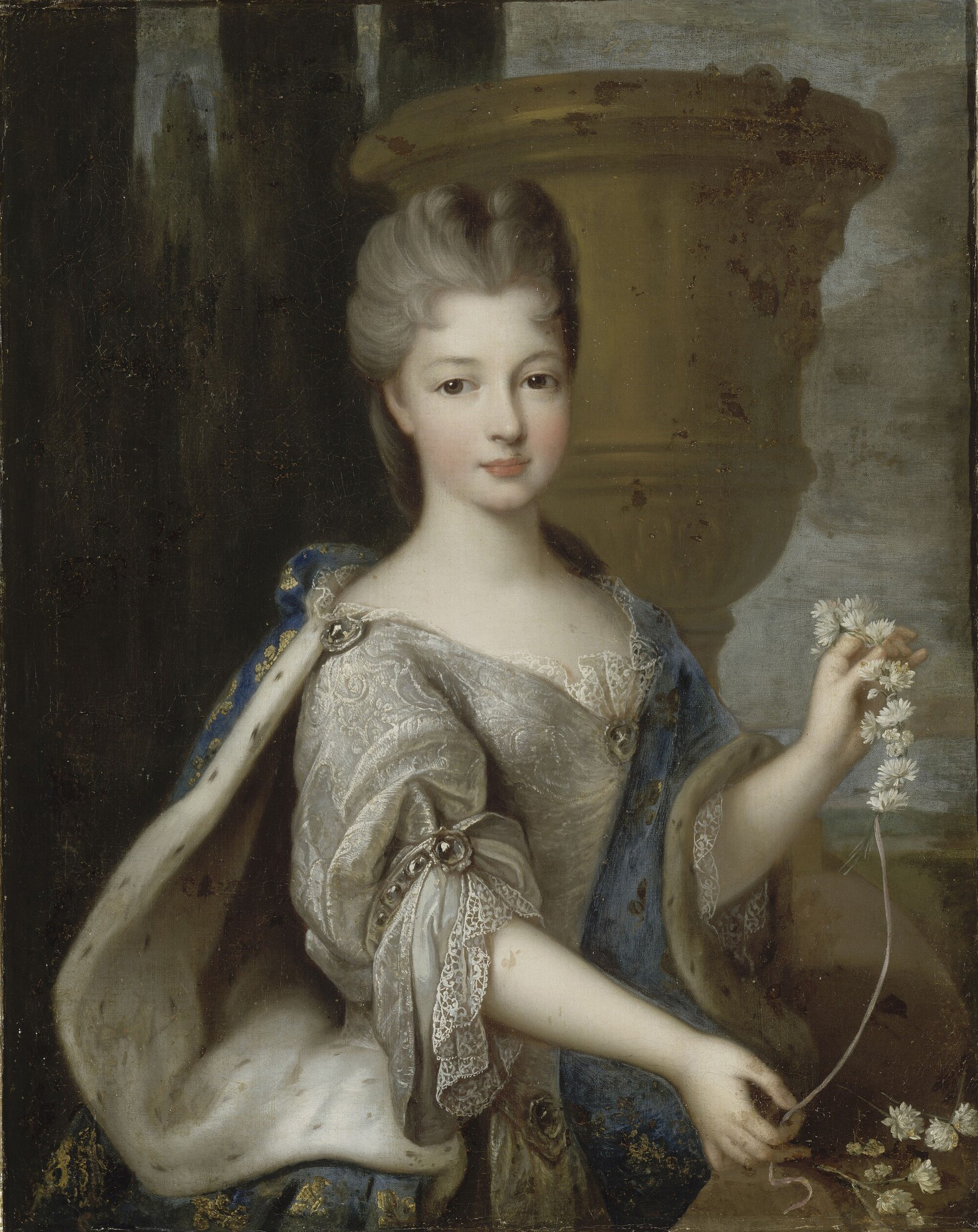
Louise Élisabeth, his wife by Pierre Gobert.

Louise Élisabeth was known to have been unfaithful to her husband, a liaison with the handsome Philippe Charles de La Fare was well known at court. In August 1716, Louis Armand caught Smallpox; it was Louise Élisabeth who would nurse him until his recovery. Louise Élisabeth later caught the illness herself but survived the disease.

It was at this time that Louis Armand found out about Louise Élisabeth's affair with Monsieur de La Fare. He is reported to have hurt his wife to the point that she had to see a doctor on two separate occasions and to carry loaded pistols with which to intimidate his wife.

Louise Élisabeth stayed at the Palais Bourbon which was her mothers private home in Paris. She also stayed at a convent in the capital. At the birth of their second son in 1717, Louis Armand said to her that he did not care for the child as he could not have been his; in turn, the proud Louise Élisabeth replied that she did not care for the child either because he was his.

The Duchess of Orleans describes him in her memoirs as a madman who would make terrible grimaces in public and who was prone to violence. This she attests went against his timid personality and was an effort to be feared.

Louise Élisabeth and Louis Armand had to go to many court hearings in Paris. In 1725, she consented to return to the Prince of Conti, who had her confined to the Château de l'Isle-Adam. She was able later, however, to convince him to allow her to return to Paris in order to give birth to her daughter. It was while in Paris she gave birth to their only daughter Louise Henriette.

He was treated with great liberality by King Louis XIV, and also by the Regent, Philippe II, Duke of Orléans. Louis Armand was a prominent supporter of the financial schemes of John Law, by which he made large sums of money.

It was during the Regency of 1715–1723, Louis Armand was appointed a member of the Regency council itself as well as a member of the Council of War. In April 1717 he received the government of the Poitou region of France. This appointment came with a wage of 45,000 Livres.

He served under Marshal Villars in the War of the Spanish Succession, but he lacked the soldierly qualities of his father.

== Death ==
Louis Armand died at the Hôtel de Conti (quai Conti) in Paris due to a "chest swelling".

== Issue ==
Name	Portrait	Lifespan	Notes
Louis de Bourbon; Count of La Marche		28 March 1715 - 1 August 1717	Born in Paris, he died in infancy;
Louis François de Bourbon; Prince of Conti		13 August 1717 - 2 August 1776	Born in Paris, he was the heir to the Conti titles and lands. Husband of Louise Diane d'Orléans; had issue;
Louis Armand de Bourbon; Duke of Mercœur		19 August 1720- 13 May 1722	Born in Paris, he died in infancy;
Charles de Bourbon; Count of Alais		5 February 1722- 7 August 1730	Born in Paris, he died in childhood;
Louise Henriette de Bourbon; Duchess of Orléans; Duchess of Étampes		20 June 1726 – 22 February 1759	Born in Paris, she was Louise Élisabeth's only daughter; known as Mademoiselle de Conti in her youth, she married Louis Philippe I, Duke of Orléans, Duke of Chartres, at Versailles in 1743; she had issue and was the mother of Philippe Égalité and Bathilde d'Orléans, the last princesse de Condé.

== Ancestry ==
Ancestors of Louis Armand II, Prince of Conti

8. Henri II, Prince of Condé
4. Armand, Prince of Conti
9. Charlotte Marguerite de Montmorency
2. François Louis, Prince of Conti
10. Girolamo Martinozzi
5. Anne Marie Martinozzi
11. Laura Margherita Mazzarini
1. Louis Armand de Bourbon
12. Louis II, Prince of Condé
6. Henri Jules, Prince of Condé
13. Claire Clémence de Maillé
3. Marie Thérèse de Bourbon
14. Edward, Count Palatine of Simmern
7. Anne Henriette of Bavaria
15. Anna Gonzaga

Louis Armand II, Prince of Conti House of Bourbon Born: 10 November 1695 Died: 4 May 1727
French nobility
Preceded by François Louis de Bourbon	Prince of Conti; 22 February 1709 – 4 May 1727	Succeeded by Louis François de Bourbon
