= Jacobite line of succession to the English and Scottish thrones in 1714 =

The following is the Jacobite line of succession to the English and Scottish thrones as of the death of Anne, Queen of Great Britain, on 1 August 1714. It reflects the laws current in England and Scotland immediately before the Act of Settlement 1701, which disqualified Catholics from the throne.

== Background ==
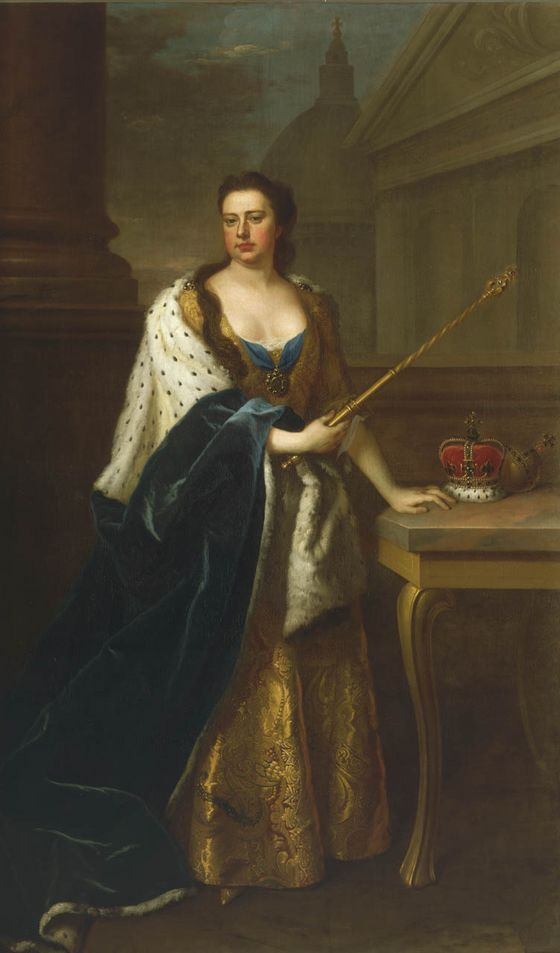
Queen Anne, the last monarch of the House of Stuart

Queen Anne of Great Britain was the last monarch of the House of Stuart. All of Anne's children died before age 12, resulting in a succession crisis which ultimately led to an Act of Parliament to designate Anne's successor.

The Act of Settlement, drawn up in 1701, settled the succession on Sophia of the Palatinate, Electress of Hanover, and the heirs of her body, barring any Roman Catholics or spouses of Roman Catholics from the succession. This was a deliberate action to exclude Anne's nearest blood relation, the exiled Roman Catholic James Stuart (who would later be known as the 'Old Pretender'), her half-brother, from inheriting the throne. The Act changed the course of British history and had many political consequences, including the two Jacobite revolts.

At the time of Anne's death in August 1714, 66 descendants of the Stuart dynasty were alive, but the first 54, being Roman Catholic, were excluded by the Act of Settlement. The succession to the British throne thus fell to the eldest son of Electress Sophia (who had died a few months before): Elector George Louis of Hanover, who became George I of Great Britain.

This article lists the 66 potential claimants.

== Line of succession ==
To show how each person's claim was derived, their ancestors back to King James VI and I – the first to occupy both thrones – are listed, without numbers. Eligible Protestants according to the Act of Settlement are noted in italics.

- James I and VI, King of England and Scotland (d. 1625)
  - Charles I, King of England and Scotland (d. 1649)
    - James II and VII, King of England and Scotland (d. 1701)
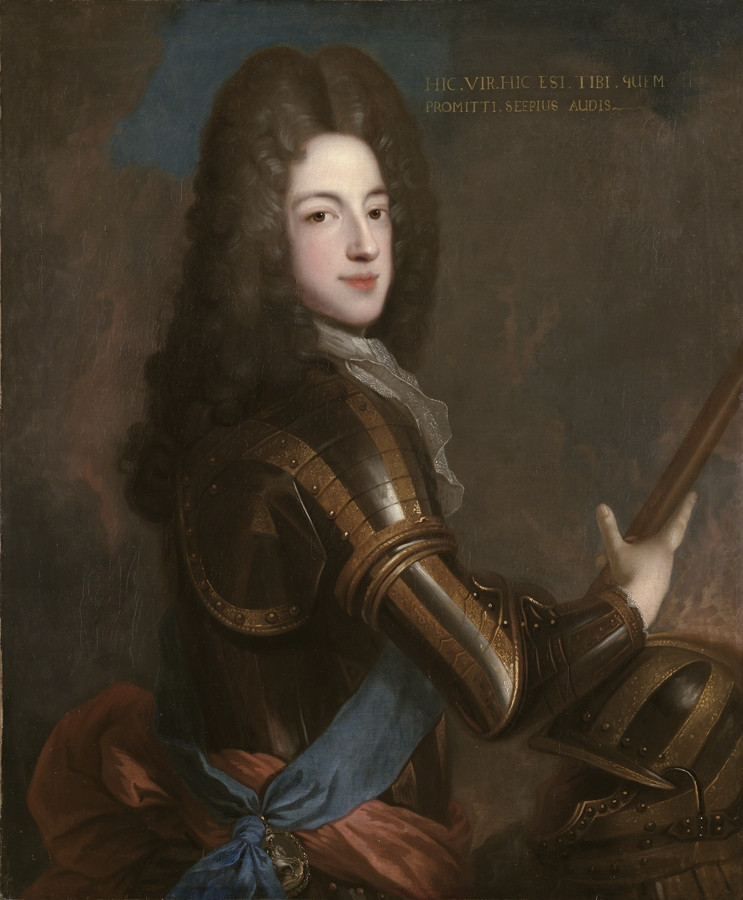
      Anne's half-brother and first in line to the throne, James Francis Edward Stuart
      - (1) James Francis Edward Stuart (1688–1766): Claimant from 1701 in opposition to heir designate George I Louis, Elector of Hanover.
    - Henrietta of England (d. 1670)
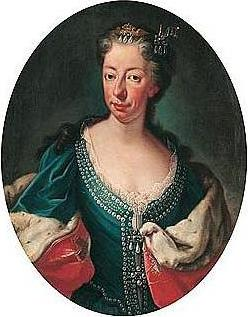
      Anne Marie d'Orléans, Queen of Sardinia, paternal first cousin of Anne and James Stuart
      - (2) Anne Marie, Queen of Sicily (1669–1728)
        - (3) Victor Amadeus, Prince of Piedmont (1699–1715)
        - (4) Prince Charles Emmanuel of Savoy, future King Charles Emmanuel III of Sardinia (1701–1773)
        - Marie Adélaïde of Savoy (d. 1712)
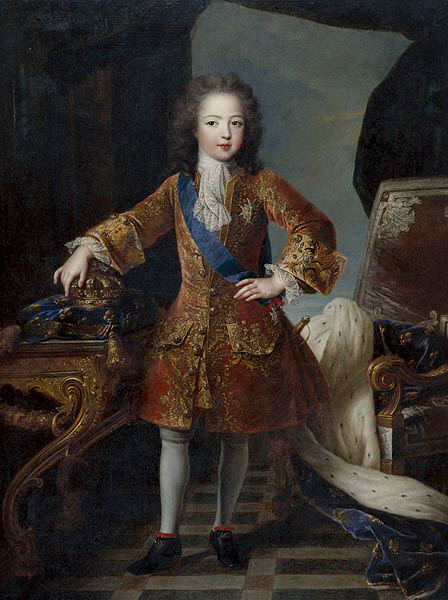
          Louis XV of France, the only surviving son of Anne Marie's eldest daughter Marie Adélaïde
          - (5) Louis, Duke of Anjou, future King Louis XV of France (1710–1774)
        - Maria Luisa of Savoy (d. 1714)
          - (6) Louis, Prince of Asturias, future King Louis of Spain (1707–1724)
          - (7) Infante Philip of Spain (1712–1719)
          - (8) Infante Ferdinand of Spain, future King Ferdinand VI of Spain (1713–1759)
  - Elizabeth of Bohemia (d. 1662)
    - Charles I Louis, Elector Palatine (d. 1680)
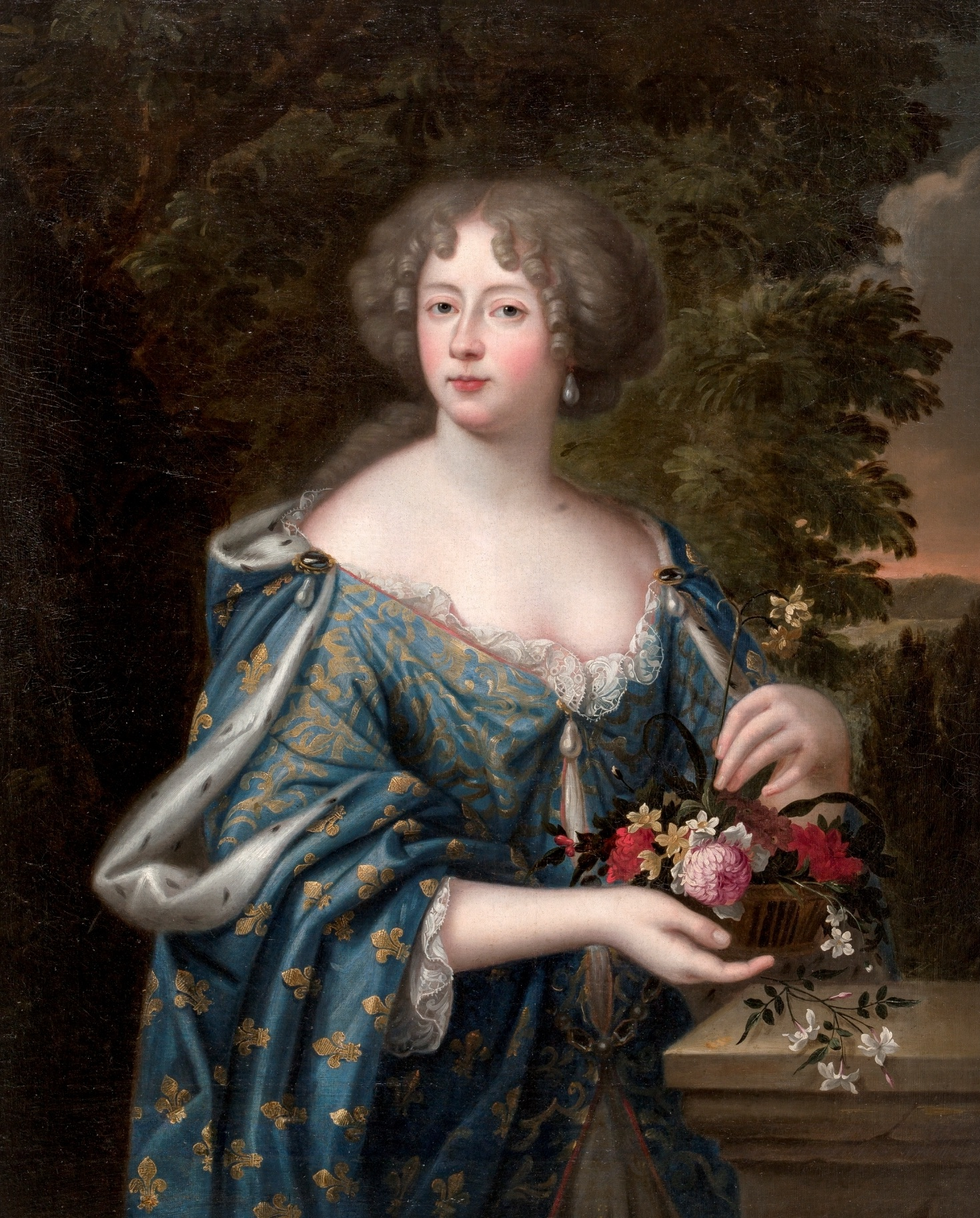
      Elizabeth Charlotte, Duchess of Orleans
      - (9) Elisabeth Charlotte, Dowager Duchess of Orléans (1652–1722)
        - (10) Philippe d'Orléans, Duke of Orléans (1674–1723)
          - (11) Louis d'Orléans, Duke of Chartres, future Duke of Orléans (1703–1752)
          - (12) Marie Louise Élisabeth d'Orléans (1695–1719)
          - (13) Louise Adélaïde d'Orléans (1698–1743)
          - (14) Charlotte Aglaé d'Orléans (1700–1761)
          - (15) Louise Élisabeth d'Orléans (1709–1742)
        - (16) Élisabeth Charlotte, Duchess of Lorraine (1676–1744)
          - (17) Prince Leopold Clement of Lorraine (1707–1723)
          - (18) Prince Francis Stephen of Lorraine, future Holy Roman Emperor (1708–1765)
          - (19) Prince Charles Alexander of Lorraine (1712–1780)
          - (20) Princess Elisabeth Therese of Lorraine (1711–1741)
          - (21) Princess Anne Charlotte of Lorraine (1714–1773)
    - Edward, Count Palatine of Simmern (d. 1663)
      - Louise Marie von Simmern (d. 1679)
        - (22) Louis Otto, Prince of Salm (1674–1738)
          - (23) Princess Dorothea of Salm (1702–1751)
          - (24) Princess Elisabeth of Salm (1704–1739)
          - (25) Princess Christine of Salm (1707–1775)
        - (26) Eleonore Christine, Duchess of Ursel (1678–1757)
      - (27) Anne Henriette, Dowager Princess of Condé (1648–1723)
        - Louis, Prince of Condé (d. 1710)
          - (28) Louis Henri, Prince of Condé (1692–1740)
          - (29) Charles, Count of Charolais (1700–1760)
          - (30) Louis, Count of Clermont (1709–1771)
          - (31) Marie Anne Éléonore, Mademoiselle de Bourbon (1690–1760)
          - (32) Louise Elisabeth, Princess of Conti (1693–1775)
          - (33) Louise Anne de Bourbon, Mlle de Sens (1695–1758)
          - (34) Marie Anne de Bourbon, Mlle de Clermont (1697–1741)
          - (35) Henriette Louise de Bourbon, Mlle de Vermandois (1703–1772)
          - (36) Élisabeth Alexandrine de Bourbon, Mlle de Gex (1705–1765)
        - (37) Marie Thérèse, Second Dowager Princess of Conti (1666–1732)
          - (38) Louis Armand, Prince of Conti (1695–1727)
          - (39) Marie Anne, Princess of Condé (1689–1720)
          - (40) Louise Adelaide de Bourbon, Mlle de la Roche-sur-Yon (1696–1750)
        - (41) Louise Bénédicte, Duchess of Maine (1676–1753)
          - (42) Louis Auguste, Prince of Dombes (1700–1755)
          - (43) Louis Charles, Count of Eu (1701–1775)
          - (44) Louise Françoise de Bourbon, Mlle du Maine (1707–1743)
        - (45) Marie Anne, Dowager Duchess of Vendôme (1678–1718)
      - (46) Benedicta Henrietta, Dowager Duchess of Brunswick-Lüneburg (1652–1730)
        - Charlotte Felicity, Duchess of Modena (d. 1710)
          - (47) Francesco d'Este, future Duke Francis III of Modena (1698–1780)
          - (48) Giovanni Federigo d'Este (1700–1727)
          - (49) Benedicta Ernestina d'Este (1697–1777)
          - (50) Anna Amalia Josepha d'Este (1699–1778)
          - (51) Enrichetta d'Este (1702–1777)
        - (52) Wilhelmina Amalia, Holy Roman Empress (1673–1742)
          - (53) Archduchess Maria Josefa of Austria (1699–1757)
          - (54) Archduchess Maria Amalia of Austria (1701–1756)
    - Sophia, Electress of Hanover (d. 1714) designated heir according to the Act of Settlement (1701)
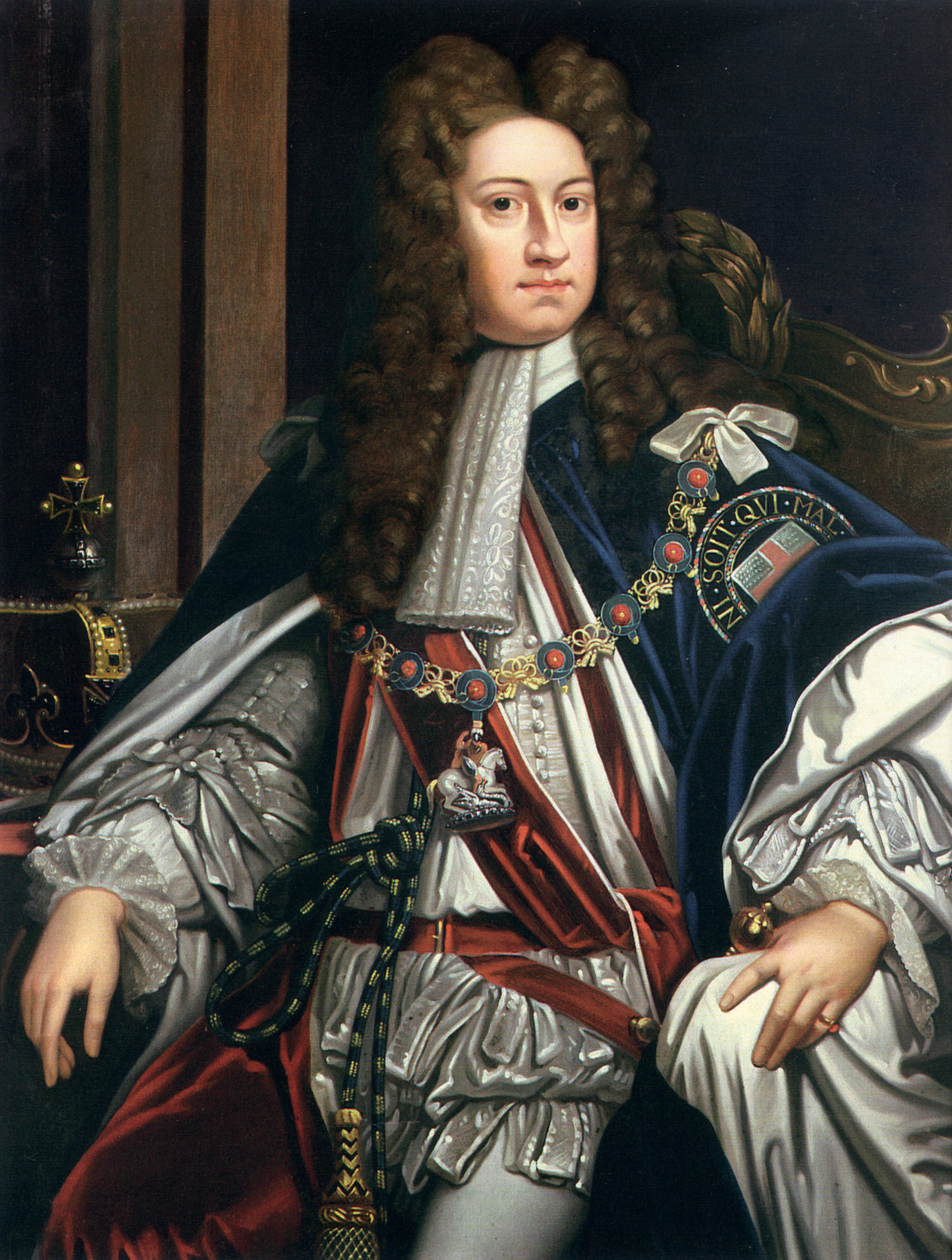
      George Ludwig, the first Protestant in succession to the British throne at the death of Queen Anne
      - (55) George I Louis, Elector of Hanover (1660–1727)
        - (56) George Augustus of Hanover, duke of Cambridge, future king George II (1683–1760)
          - (57) Frederick Louis of Hanover, future prince of Wales (1707–1751)
          - (58) Anne of Hanover (1709–1759)
          - (59) Amelia of Hanover (1711–1786)
          - (60) Caroline of Hanover (1713–1757)
        - (61) Sophia Dorothea of Hanover (1687–1757)
          - (62) Frederick of Prussia, future king of Prussia (1712–1786)
          - (63) Wilhelmine of Prussia (1709–1758)
      - (64) Maximilian William of Hanover (1666–1726)
      - (65) Ernest Augustus of Hanover, future duke of York and Albany, future prince-bishop of Osnabrück (1674–1728)
      - Sophia Charlotte of Hanover (d. 1705)
        - (66) Frederick William I, king in Prussia (1688–1740)

== See also ==
- Succession to the British throne
- List of heirs to the English throne
- List of heirs to the Scottish throne
- List of heirs to the British throne
