= Louise Françoise, Princess of Condé =

Princess of Condé; legitimized daughter of Louis XIV

Louise Françoise
- Princess of Condé; Duchess of Bourbon; Légitimée de France
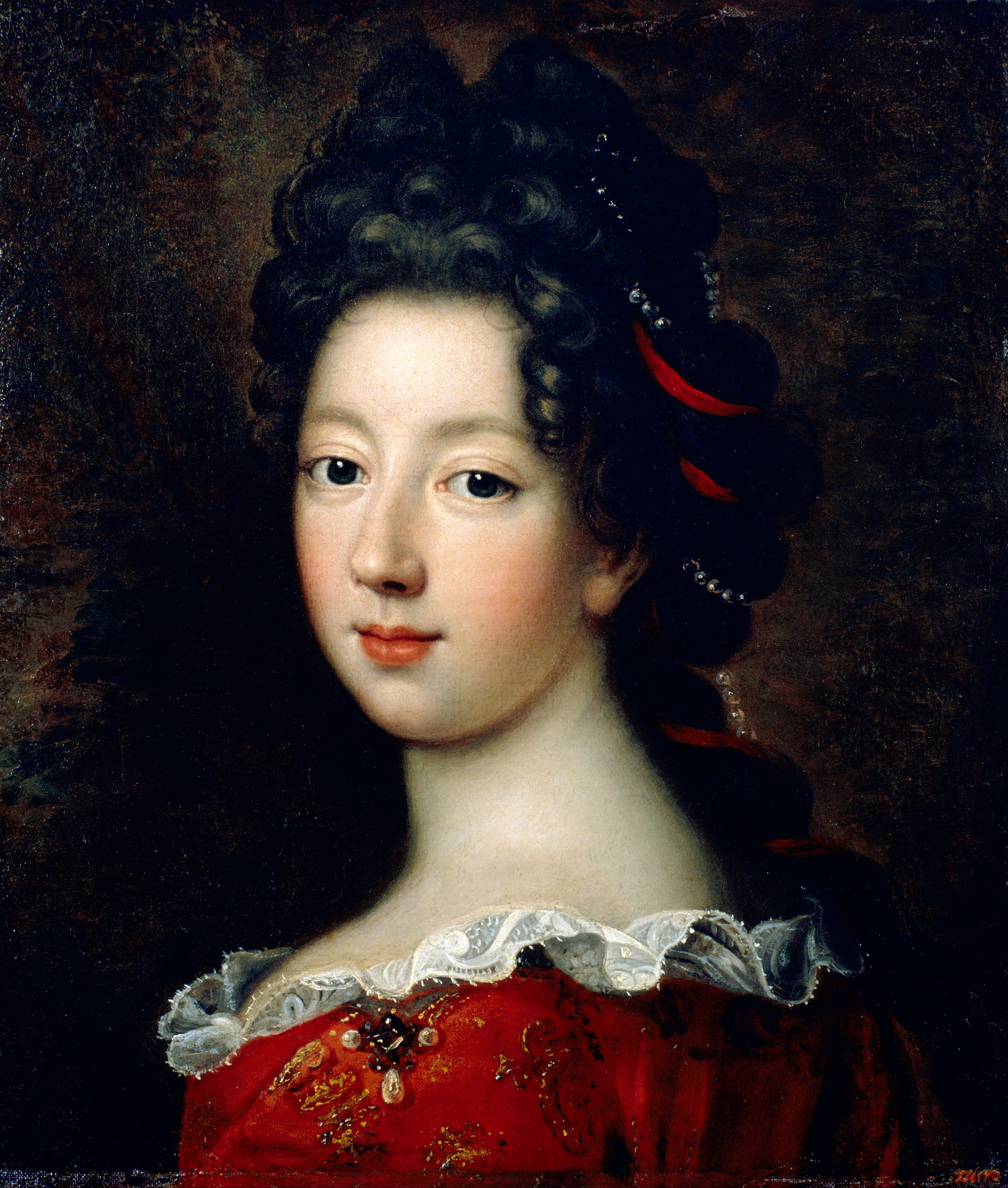
- Portrait by François de Troy, c. 1688–92
- Born: 1 June 1673; Tournai, France
- Died: 16 June 1743 (aged 70); Palais Bourbon, Paris, France
- Burial: Carmel du faubourg Saint-Jacques, Paris, France
- Spouse: Louis III, Prince of Condé (m. 1685; died 1710)
- Issue Detail: Marie Anne Éléonore, Mademoiselle de Bourbon; Louis Henri, Duke of Bourbon; Louise Élisabeth, Princess of Conti; Louise Anne, Mademoiselle de Charolais; Marie Anne, Mademoiselle de Clermont; Charles, Count of Charolais; Henriette Louise, Mademoiselle de Vermandois; Élisabeth Alexandrine, Mademoiselle de Sens; Louis, Count of Clermont
- House: Bourbon
- Father: Louis XIV of France
- Mother: Françoise-Athénaïs, Marquise de Montespan

Louise Françoise, Duchess of Bourbon, Légitimée de France (French pronunciation: [lwiz fʁɑ̃swaz]; 1 June 1673 – 16 June 1743) was the eldest surviving legitimised daughter of Louis XIV of France and his maîtresse-en-titre Françoise-Athénaïs, Marquise de Montespan. She was said to have been named after her godmother, Louise de La Vallière, the woman her mother had replaced as the King's mistress. Before her marriage, she was known at court as Mademoiselle de Nantes.

Married at the age of 11, Louise Françoise became known as Madame la Duchesse, a style she kept as a widow. She was Duchess of Bourbon and Princess of Condé by marriage. She was later a leading member of the cabale de Meudon, a group centered on her half-brother Louis, Grand Dauphin. While her son Louis Henri, Duke of Bourbon, was Prime Minister of France, she tried to further her political influence, but to little avail.

Considered attractive, Louise Françoise had a turbulent love life and was frequently part of scandals during her father's reign. Later in life, she built the Palais Bourbon in Paris, the present seat of the National Assembly, with the fortune she amassed having invested greatly with John Law.

== Early life (1673–1685) ==
Louise Françoise was born in Tournai on 1 June 1673 while her parents, King Louis XIV of France and Françoise-Athénaïs de Rochechouart were on a military tour; her maternal aunt, the Marquise de Thianges, was there also. After returning from Tournai, her parents placed her and her older siblings in the care of one of her mother's acquaintances, the widowed Madame Scarron.

On 19 December 1673, Louis XIV legitimised the children he had had with his mistress in a legitimisation process that was recognised with letters patent from the Parlement of Paris. At the time of their legitimisation, her eldest brother, Louis Auguste de Bourbon, received the title of Duke of Maine; her next eldest brother, Louis-César de Bourbon, became the Count of Vexin, while Louise Françoise received the courtesy title of Mademoiselle de Nantes. Her parents had nicknamed her Poupotte after her doll-like appearance.

In the year after her birth, another sibling joined Louis-Auguste, Louis-César, and Louise Françoise at their residence in Paris. The future Mademoiselle de Tours had been born at the Château de Saint-Germain-en-Laye in November 1674. The young Mademoiselle de Tours was legitimised in 1676 and would become a great friend of Louise Françoise. When she died in 1681, Louise Françoise was deeply affected.

After the death of Mademoiselle de Tours, Madame de Montespan wrote to the Duc du Maine:

I do not speak to you of my grief, you are naturally too good not to have experienced it for yourself. As for Mademoiselle de Nantes, she has felt it as deeply as if she were twenty and has received the visits of the Queen and Madame la Dauphine.

The Mesdemoiselles of Nantes and of Tours had been raised together in a private house on the Rue de Vaugirard in Paris, where the King's illegitimate children with Madame de Montespan had been hidden away from the prying eyes of the court by their parents. Louise Françoise would never be close to either her older half-sister, Marie Anne de Bourbon, or younger full sister, Marie Françoise de Bourbon, as the three sisters were intensely jealous of each other. Louise Françoise and Marie Françoise were especially competitive, despising any increase in status or rank that the other, or any of her children, might achieve. Louise Françoise was, however, close to her half-brother Louis, Grand Dauphin.

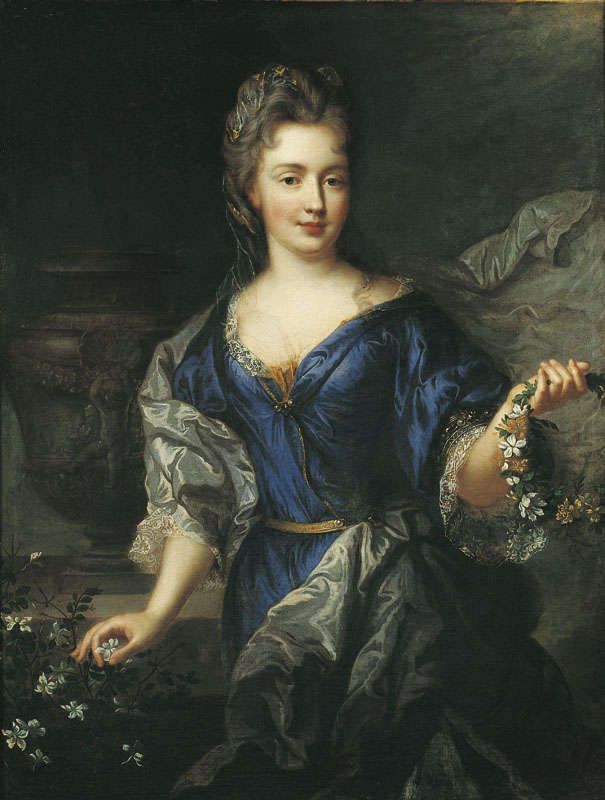
Her older half-sister Marie Anne de Bourbon

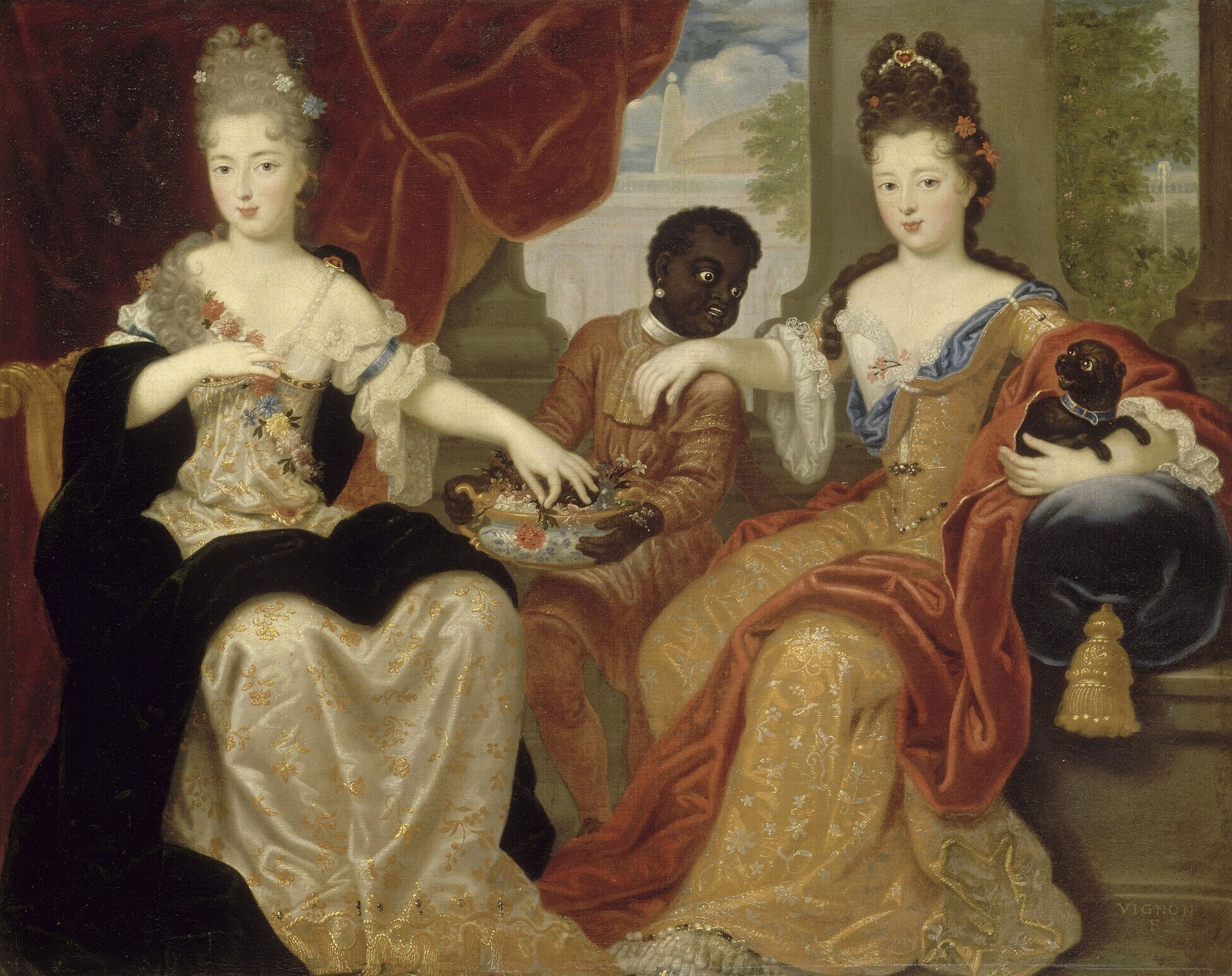
Younger sister Marie Françoise de Bourbon (left) and Louise Françoise (right) along with an enslaved Black attendant (centre)

Having inherited her parents' passion for music and dance, Louise Françoise became a good dancer. When she was nine, she played Youth in a ballet dedicated to the Dauphine of France. She also inherited her mother's sharp and caustic wit, the famous Mortemart esprit, which made her popular with some but not with others. Saint-Simon later said of the future Princess of Condé:

. . . her face was formed by the most tender loves and her nature made to dally with them. She possessed the art of placing everyone at their ease; there was nothing about her which did not tend naturally to please, with a grace unparalleled, even in her slightest actions. She made captive even those who had the most cause to fear her, and those who had the best of reasons to hate her required often to recall the fact to resist her charms. Sportive, gay, and merry, she passed her youth in frivolity and in pleasures of all kinds, and, whenever the opportunity presented itself, they extended even to debauchery.

She was also called the...

prettiest, wittiest, and naughtiest of the fast set in the latter half of the reign, and was in constant hot water. Her comic verse, too often indecent, was genuinely amusing, except to the victims, and the king was not at all amused at a set which she had written on his august self.

== Duchess of Bourbon (1685–1710) ==
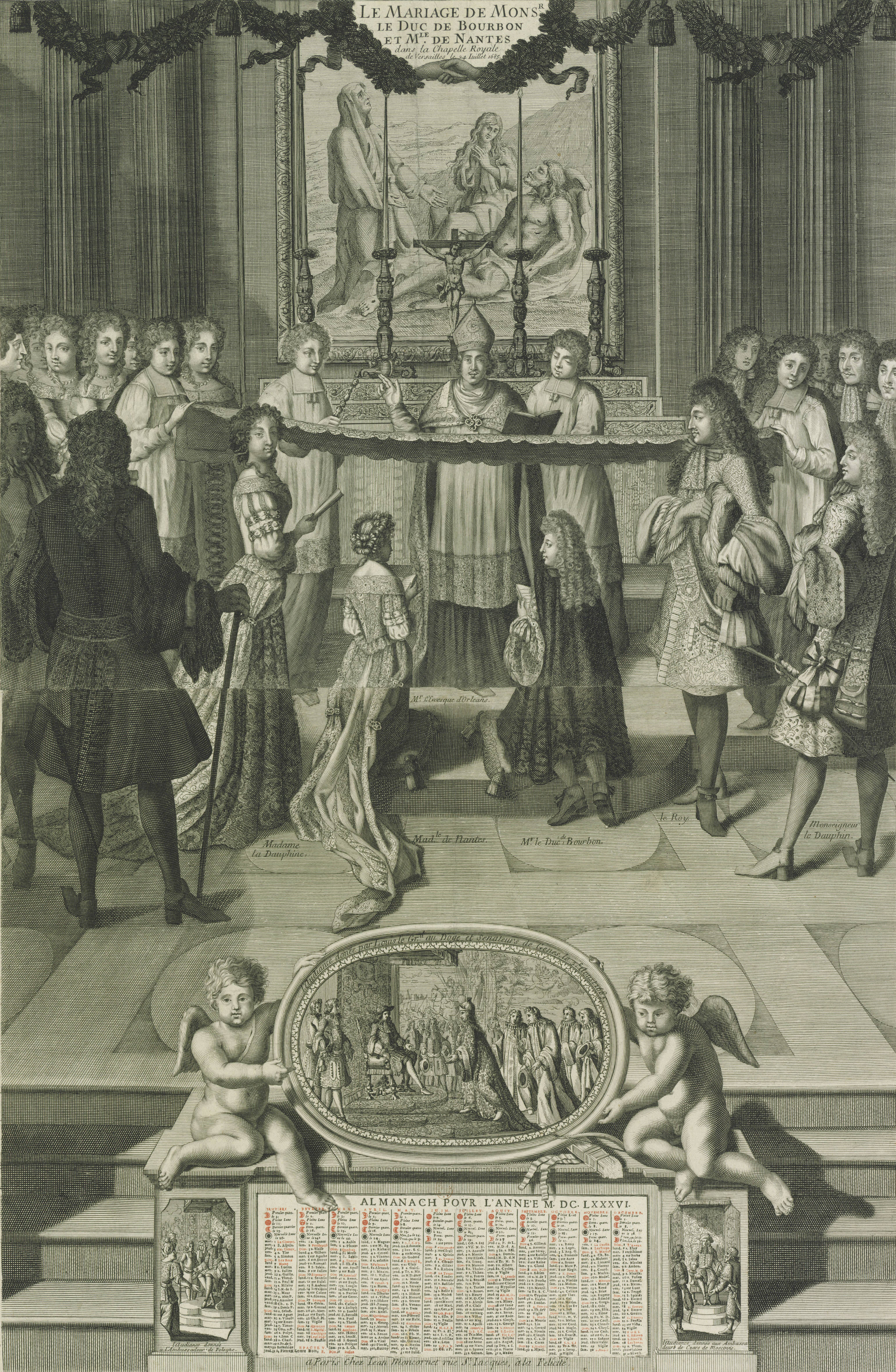
The marriage of Mademoiselle de Nantes to the Duke of Bourbon (by an anonymous artist, 1685)

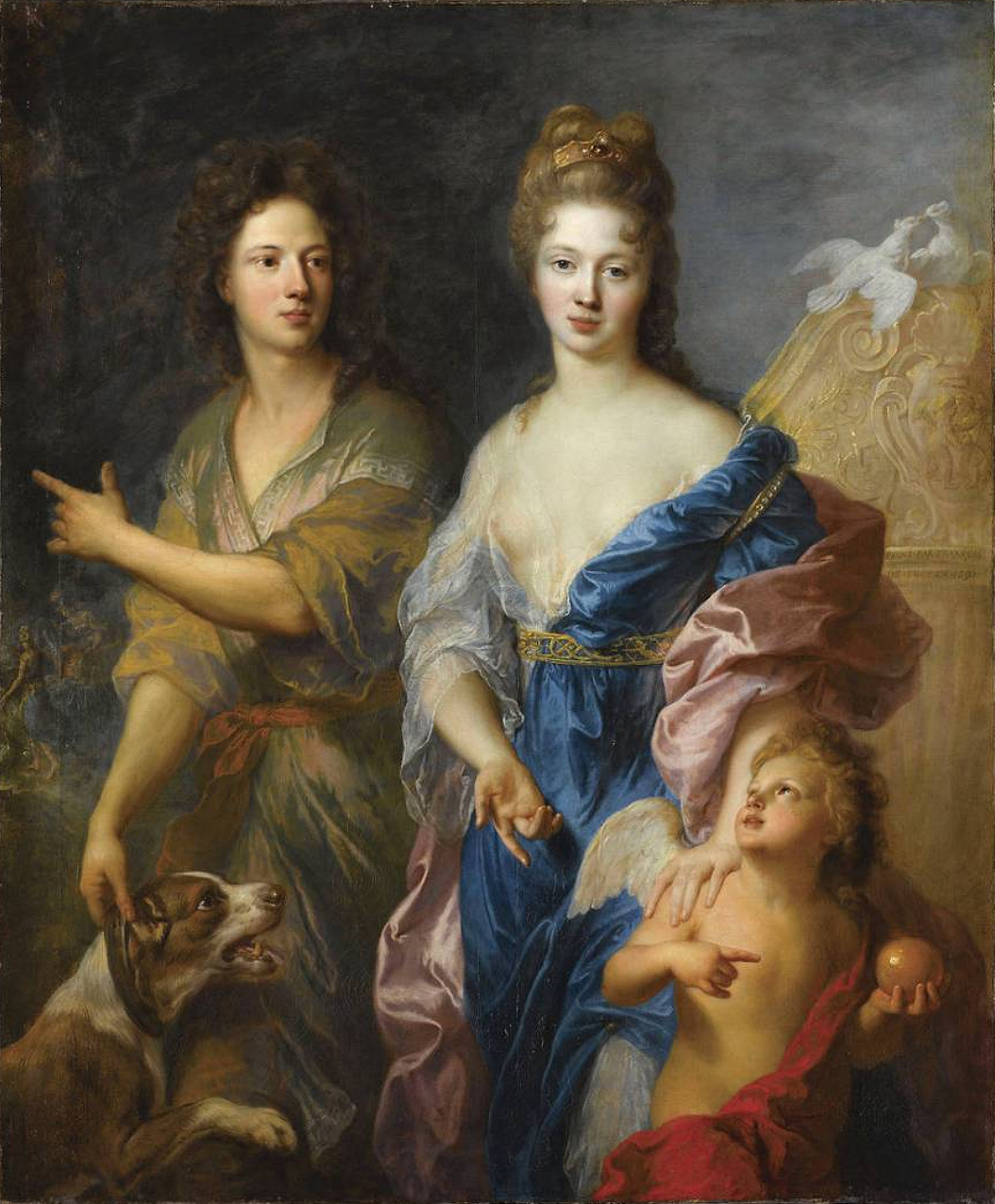
Louise Françoise and her older brother Louis Auguste, by François de Troy (1691)

On 25 May 1685, at the age of eleven, Louise Françoise was married to Louis de Bourbon, Duke of Bourbon, a distant sixteen-year-old cousin of her father. Her husband was the son of Henri-Jules, Duke of Enghien, the son of the head of the House of Condé, a cadet branch of the reigning House of Bourbon. His mother was Anne Henriette of Bavaria. Louis XIV gave his daughter a large dowry of one million livres upon her marriage.

At court, Louise Françoise's husband was known by the courtesy title of duc de Bourbon, and was addressed as Monsieur le Duc. As a result, his new wife became known as Madame la Duchesse.

Some time after her marriage in 1686, while the court was in residence at the Palace of Fontainebleau, Louise Françoise contracted smallpox. While her then seventeen-year-old husband did not help nurse her back to health, her mother and grandfather-in-law, the Grand Condé, did. Louise Françoise recovered, but the Grand Condé died the following November after having caught her illness. Louise Françoise and her husband eventually had nine children, all of whom survived into adulthood, something rare at the time.

After her mother officially left court in 1691, Louise Françoise would visit her at the convent of the Filles de Saint-Joseph, in the Rue Saint-Dominique in Paris, where she had retired. As they saw each other often, the two became much closer, and so Louise Françoise was deeply affected by her mother's death in 1707. Louis XIV forbade anyone at court to wear mourning clothes for his former mistress, but, as a mark of respect for their mother, Louise Françoise and her two younger siblings, Marie Françoise de Bourbon and the Count of Toulouse, decided not to attend any court gatherings. On the other hand, her older brother, the Duke of Maine, could barely conceal his joy at inheriting his mother's fortune. The Château de Clagny was bequeathed to him, but he rarely used it.

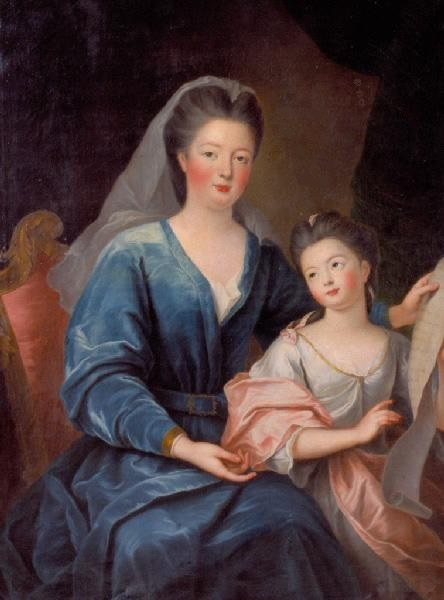
Portrait of Louise Françoise and her daughter Henriette Louise (by Pierre Gobert)

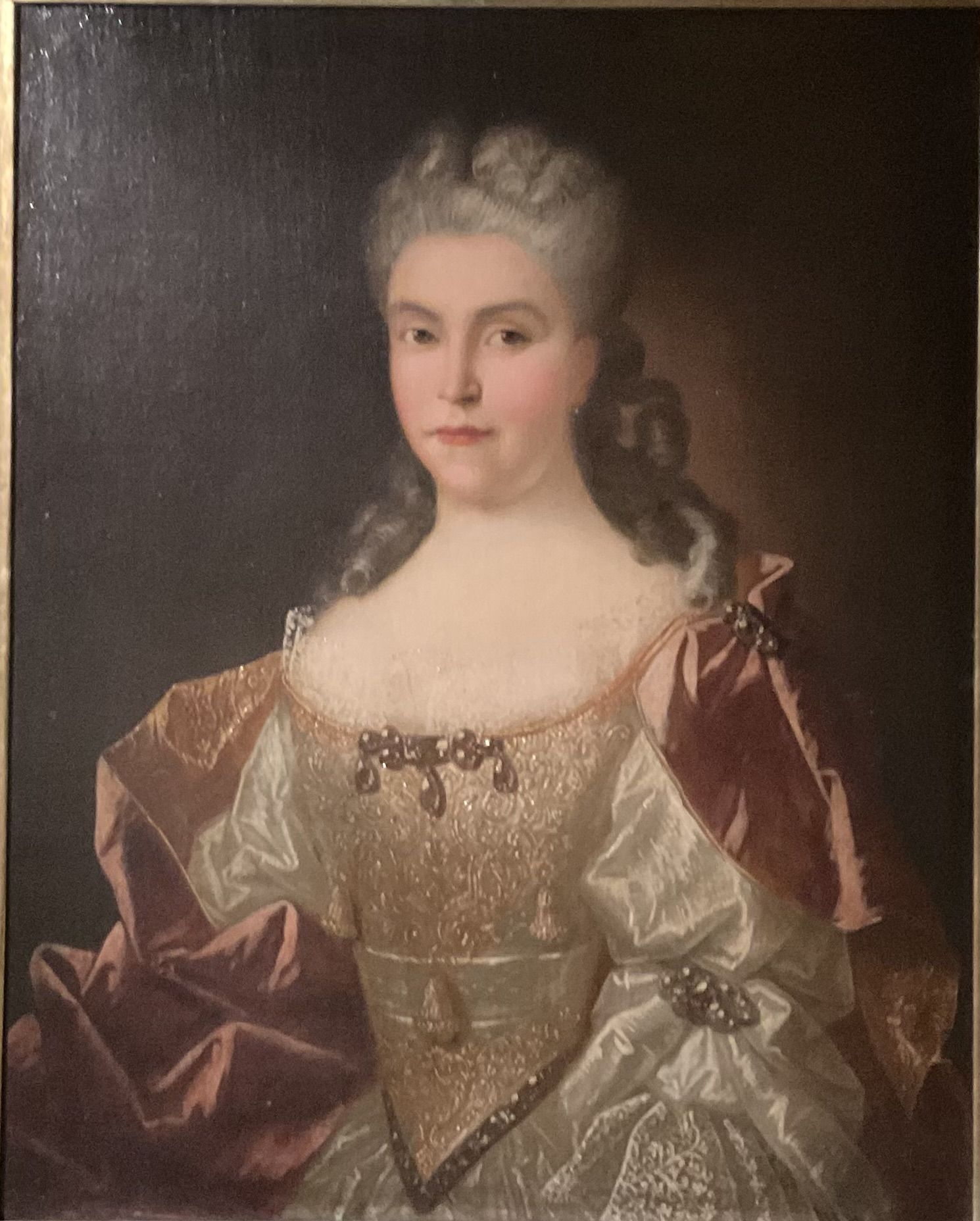
Portrait completed in 1690 showing the flattering style of Francois de Troy

In 1692, her youngest sister, Marie Françoise, was married to their first cousin, Philippe d'Orléans, the only son and heir of their uncle, Monsieur. As the wife of a petit-fils de France, Marie Françoise took precedence at court over Louise Françoise and their half-sister Marie Anne. This, combined with the fact that Marie Françoise received a dowry twice the amount given to her older sister, greatly angered Louise Françoise, who thereafter became quite competitive with her younger, more successful sister.

Louise Françoise, considered beautiful and vivacious, began a romantic affair with François Louis de Bourbon, Prince of Conti, the handsome brother-in-law of her older half-sister, Marie Anne de Bourbon, in 1695. François Louis' wife was the pious Marie Thérèse de Bourbon; Marie Thérèse was in turn the oldest sister of Louise Françoise's husband. Louise Françoise's fourth daughter Marie Anne, born in 1697, was rumoured to have been the result of this affair.

When her husband discovered her infidelity, he was furious but did not openly quarrel with the Prince of Conti due to a fear of his father-in-law, Louis XIV. Her older half-brother, the Dauphin, allowed the couple to meet at his country estate at Meudon away from her husband and the court.

Upon the death of her father-in-law on 1 April 1709, her husband succeeded to the title of Prince of Condé. He did not, however, succeed to his father's rank of Premier Prince du Sang, which was instead officially transferred from the House of Condé to the House of Orléans. As a result, her younger sister's husband, the Duke of Orléans, became entitled to use the style of Monsieur le Prince. His wife, Louise Françoise's sister Marie Françoise, accordingly became entitled to use the style Madame la Princesse. Despite the fact that Marie Françoise never referred to herself as Madame la Princesse, this transfer in rank from the House of Condé to the House of Orléans greatly aggravated the rivalry between Louise Françoise and her younger sister.

== Princess of Condé and widowhood (1710–1740) ==
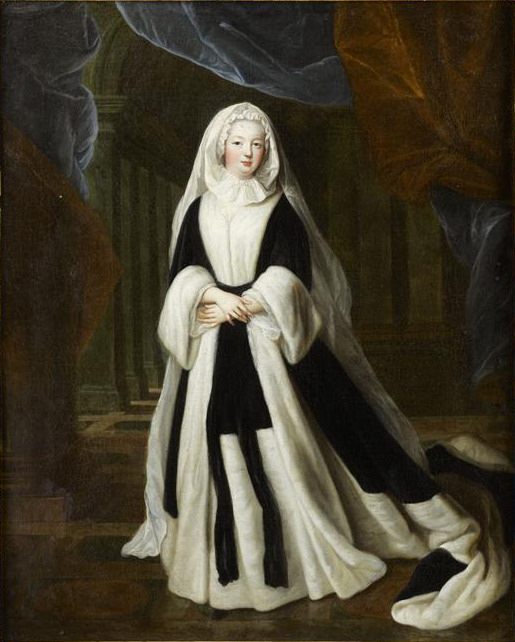
Louise Françoise in widow's dress by Pierre Gobert, 1710, Musée Condé

Louise Françoise's husband, who had by this time descended into madness, did not survive his father long and died within the year in 1710. Although Louise Françoise should have officially assumed the style of Madame la Princesse de Condé douairière (Dowager Princess of Condé) upon the death of her husband, she instead chose to be known in her widowhood as Madame la Duchesse douairière. She had a portrait taken in widow's dress. When her husband died she is said to have been affected but Madame de Caylus did not believe her grief was sincere.

Perhaps in the hope of ingratiating herself with the future King, Louise Françoise frequently attended the court of her older half-brother, Monseigneur, at the Château de Meudon. At Meudon, she became close to Élisabeth-Thérèse de Lorraine, Princess of Epinoy and her older sister, Mademoiselle de Lillebonne, a future Abbess of Remiremont. Unexpectedly, the Dauphin died in 1711, ruining his sister's plan of establishing a more solid relationship with the Crown. Despite her dashed hopes, Louise Françoise was deeply affected by the Dauphin's death. This death made her nephew, Louis, Duke of Burgundy, and his wife, Marie Adélaïde, the new Dauphin and Dauphine.

Marie Adélaïde and Louise Françoise were to become bitter enemies because of the new Dauphine's condescending attitude toward ladies of inferior rank. The Duchess of Orléans and the older Dowager Princess of Conti also grew to dislike their niece for her haughty behaviour.

As a dowager, Louise Françoise became a good friend of Jeanne Baptiste d'Albert de Luynes, the former mistress of Victor Amadeus, Duke of Savoy. Jeanne Baptiste had escaped Savoy in 1700 and had been residing in Paris ever since.

Within two years, in 1712, the new Dauphin and his young wife died, leaving only a small son, the Duke of Anjou, as the legitimate heir of Louis XIV. In 1715 the King died and was succeeded by his five-year-old great-grandson, Louis XV. A controversy immediately arose between Louise Françoise's older brother, the Duke of Maine, and her brother-in-law, the Duke of Orléans, over which of the two should be declared regent. After the Parlement of Paris had deliberated for a week, the Duke of Orléans was declared the official regent. This, of course, exacerbated the rivalry between Louise Françoise and her younger sister, the Duchess of Orléans, now the highest-ranking woman in France.

During the Régence, Louise Françoise was frequently occupied with the escapades of her second daughter, Louise Élisabeth, Princess of Conti, who had become the mistress of Philippe Charles de La Fare. When her daughter's husband, the Prince of Conti, discovered the liaison, he became physically abusive toward his wife. The only son of the Conti couple, Louis François de Bourbon, was thought to have been the result of his mother's adulterous relationship with La Fare. Louise Élisabeth later took refuge from her violent husband with her mother at the Palais Bourbon.

In 1714 her niece, Mademoiselle du Maine, the daughter of her older brother, the Duke of Maine, was named in her honour.

In the 1720s, Louise Françoise became the mistress of the Armand de Madaillan de Lesparre. In order to be closer to her, he built the Hôtel de Lassay next to the Palais Bourbon, her residence in Paris. Later on, a gallery was built, housing the grander, more public part of the collection of paintings that made Lassay's reputation as a connoisseur redound in Parisian circles for a generation after his death; the gallery that joined the two buildings also enabled the lovers to have better access to each other.

In 1737, she was asked to be the godmother to Louis XV's eldest son, Louis, Dauphin of France. The young Dauphin's godfather was Louise Françoise's nephew, Louis, Duke of Orléans.

When her son was disgraced during the regency of the Duke of Orléans, Louise Françoise regarded his mistress Madame de Prie as the cause. As such, Louise Françoise detested her. Her son died in exile in 1740 to be succeeded by his son, Louise Françoise's grandson, Louis Joseph, Prince of Condé, who was aged four.

== Palais Bourbon ==
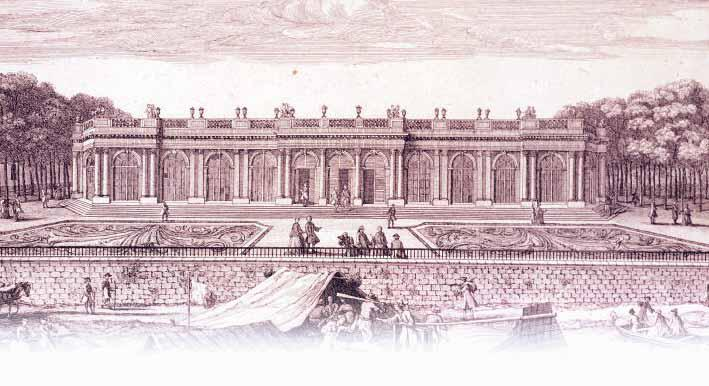
Garden façade of the Palais Bourbon, facing the Seine, as built by Louise Françoise

During her long widowhood, Louise Françoise built the Palais Bourbon in Paris, not far from the residences of her surviving siblings. Named after her family, it was built after her stay at the Grand Trianon, which became the architectural inspiration for her new home.

Construction on the palace started in 1722, when she was forty-nine years old. Several designers were involved, including Robert de Cotte, who drew up plans around 1720, Lorenzo Giardini, who died in 1722, and Lassurance, who died in 1724. Jean Aubert became the chief architect in 1726 and is given credit for the definitive design. Jacques Gabriel acted as a consultant.

The palace had a collection of large reception rooms, the main one being the galerie which overlooked the Seine; the main salon of the palace looked towards the Tuileries Palace to the east. The palace was linked to the Hôtel de Lassay by means of a corridor overlooking a joint parterre.

Her older half-sister, Marie Anne de Bourbon, who was the Dowager Princess of Conti, lived in the Hôtel de Conti, opposite the Louvre, on the Quai de Conti. Her older brother, the Duke of Maine, owned the Hôtel du Maine (destroyed in 1838) on the Rue Bourbon (now the Rue de Lille), very near the Palais Bourbon. Her younger sister, the Duchess of Orléans, lived in the Palais-Royal, the Orléans residence in Paris. Near the Louvre and the Palais-Royal, her youngest brother, the Count of Toulouse, lived in the Hôtel de Toulouse. In 1733 her daughter Louise Élisabeth moved into a house very near the Palais Bourbon, which became another Hôtel de Conti (now the Hôtel de Brienne), on the Rue Saint-Dominique.

== Death ==
Louise Françoise de Bourbon died on 16 June 1743, at the age of seventy, at the Palais Bourbon. She was buried at the Carmel du faubourg Saint-Jacques, a Carmelite convent on the Left Bank in Paris's Latin Quarter.

== Children ==
Louise Françoise gave birth to nine children:

Name	Portrait	Lifespan	Notes
Marie Anne Gabrielle Éléonore de Bourbon; Abbess of Saint-Antoine-des-Champs		22 December 1690 - 30 August 1760	Born at the Palace of Versailles; became abbess of Saint-Antoine-des-Champs in her teens; died in Villejuif. During her youth, she was known as Mademoiselle de Condé and de Bourbon.
Louis Henri Joseph de Bourbon; Duke of Bourbon; Prince of Condé		18 August 1692 - 27 January 1740	Born at the Palace of Versailles and married twice; first to his paternal cousin Marie Anne de Bourbon and had no issue. He later married Landgravine Caroline of Hesse-Rotenburg and had issue. He was the Prime Minister of France during the reign of Louis XV of France but the king had him exiled. Louis Henri died in exile at the Château de Chantilly.
Louise Élisabeth de Bourbon; Princess of Conti		22 November 1693 – 27 May 1775	Born at the Palace of Versailles, she married her paternal cousin Louis Armand II, Prince of Conti. She was the maternal grandmother of Philippe Égalité. She died in Paris having outlived all her siblings.
Louise Anne de Bourbon; Mademoiselle de Charolais		23 June 1695 - 8 April 1758	Born at the Palace of Versailles, she never married; she had a romantic affair with the Duke of Richelieu and was his mistress just like her cousin, Charlotte Aglaé d'Orléans. She never had any legitimate children, but was suspected of having illegitimate issue, although there was no evidence. She owned the Hôtel de Rothelin-Charolais (where she died) and in her life was known as Mademoiselle de Sens and then Mademoiselle de Charolais.
Marie Anne de Bourbon; Mademoiselle de Clermont		16 October 1697 - 11 August 1741	Born in Paris, she was said to have been the fruit of her mother's affair with François Louis, Prince of Conti. She married Louis de Melun, Duke of Joyeuse in 1719, in secret and against her brother's wishes; she died in Paris after having been for many years in the service of Queen Maria Leszczyńska; known as Mademoiselle de Clermont.
Charles de Bourbon; Count of Charolais		19 June 1700 - 23 July 1760	Born at Chantilly, he was known as the Count of Charolais and on his death, the title was passed to his sister Louise Anne; He secretly married Jeanne de Valois-Saint-Rémy, a descendant of Henry II of France via an illegitimate branch. Their son was Louis-Thomas (1718–1799), who was not legitimated by the King, later was exiled to England; he also had issue from his affair with one Marguerite Caron de Rancurel. He died in Paris.
Henriette Louise Marie Françoise Gabrielle de Bourbon; Abbess of Beaumont-lès-Tours		15 January 1703 - 19 September 1772	Born at the Palace of Versailles, she was once considered as a possible bride for Louis XV; despite that, she never married. Known as Mademoiselle de Vermandois, she was the abbesse de Beaumont-lès-Tours from 1728; she died at Beaumont.
Élisabeth Thérèse Alexandrine de Bourbon; Mademoiselle de Sens		15 September 1705 - 15 April 1765	Born in Paris she was known as Mademoiselle de Sens; her vast fortune went to her nephew, Louis Joseph de Bourbon – future Prince of Condé.
Louis de Bourbon; Count of Clermont		15 June 1709- 16 June 1771	Born at the Palace of Versailles, he was the Count of Clermont from birth and was the abbé de Saint-Germain-des-Près from 1737; never married and died at Versailles; he founded the Académie du Petit-Luxembourg, where scientists, artists and architects would meet. He was also the fifth Grand Master of the Grand Lodge of France, the supreme Masonic authority in France, which existed from approximately 1728 until its reorganisation in 1773.

== Ancestry ==
Ancestors of Louise Françoise, Princess of Condé

8. Henry IV of France
4. Louis XIII of France
9. Marie de' Medici
2. Louis XIV of France
10. Philip III of Spain
5. Anne of Austria
11. Margaret of Austria
1. Louise Françoise de Bourbon
12. Gaspard de Rochechouart, marquis de Mortemart
6. Gabriel de Rochechouart, duc de Mortemart
13. Louise de Maure, comtesse de Maure
3. Madame de Montespan
14. Jean de Grandseigne, marquis de Marsillac
7. Diane de Grandseigne
15. Catherine de La Béraudière, dame de Villenon

== Notes ==
Louise Françoise, Princess of Condé House of Bourbon Born: 1 June 1673 Died: 16 June 1743
French nobility
Preceded by Royal domain	Mademoiselle de Nantes; 19 December 1673 – 25 May 1685	Succeeded by Royal domain
Preceded by Anne Henriette of Bavaria	Duchess of Bourbon; 25 May 1685 – 1 April 1709	Succeeded by Marie Anne de Bourbon
Preceded by Anne Henriette of Bavaria	Princess of Condé; 1 April 1709 – 16 June 1743	Succeeded by de facto Marie Anne de Bourbon but did not use the title
