= Marie Anne de Bourbon (1697–1741) =

- Mademoiselle de Clermont
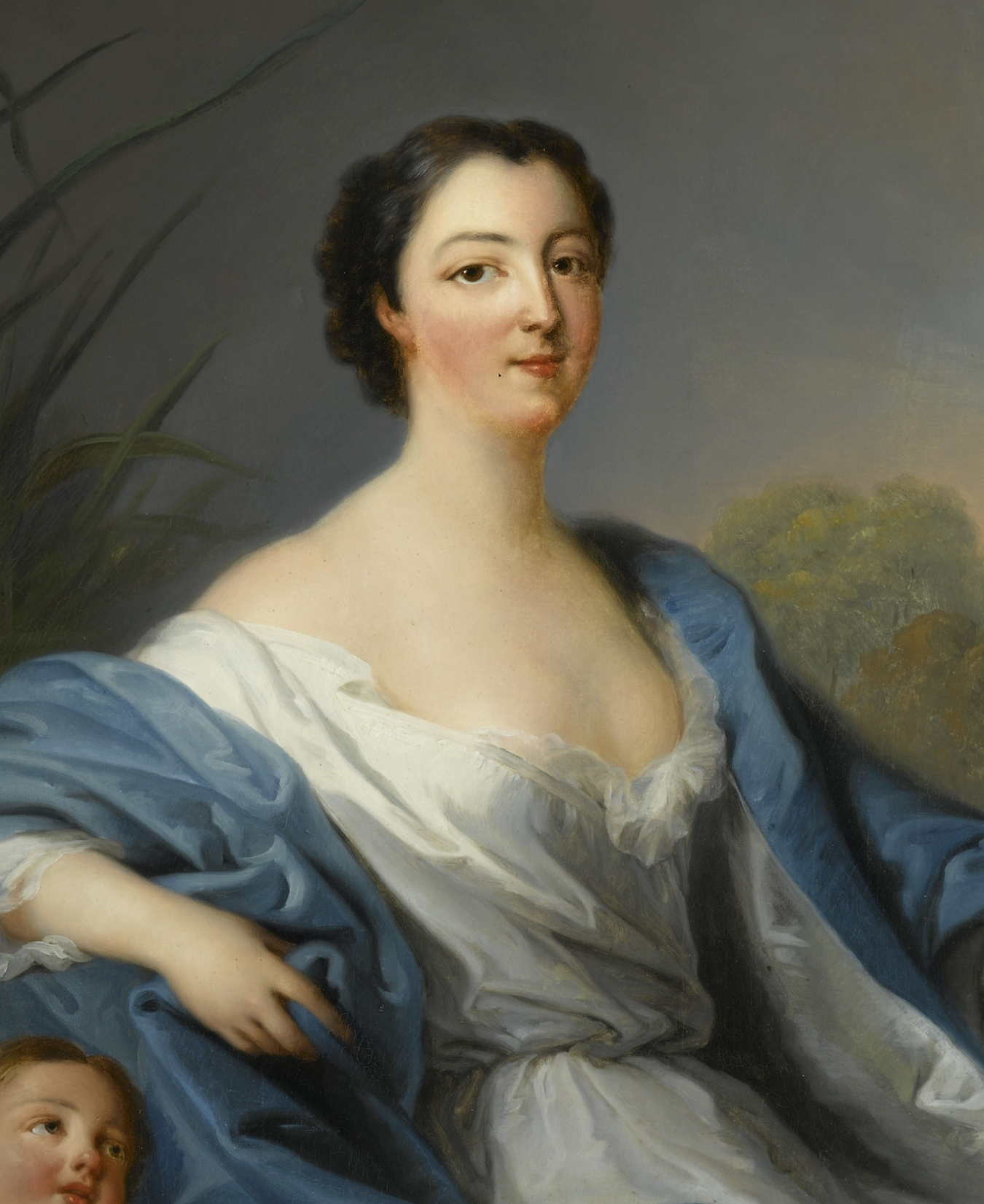
- Portrait by Aimée Brune-Pagès
- Born: 16 October 1697; Hôtel de Condé, Paris, France
- Died: 11 August 1741 (aged 43); Hôtel du Petit Luxembourg, Paris, France
- Spouse: Louis, Duke of Joyeuse (m. 1719; died 1724)
- Father: Louis III, Prince of Condé
- Mother: Louise-Françoise de Bourbon

Marie Anne de Bourbon (French pronunciation: [maʁi an də buʁbɔ̃]; 16 October 1697 – 11 August 1741) was Surintendante de la Maison de la Reine (Superintendent of the Household) to the French queen Maria Leszczyńska. She was the daughter of Louis III, Prince of Condé. Her father was the grandson of le Grand Condé and her mother, Louise Françoise de Bourbon, Mademoiselle de Nantes, was the eldest surviving daughter of Louis XIV and his maîtresse-en-titre, Madame de Montespan. She was known as Mademoiselle de Clermont.

== Biography ==
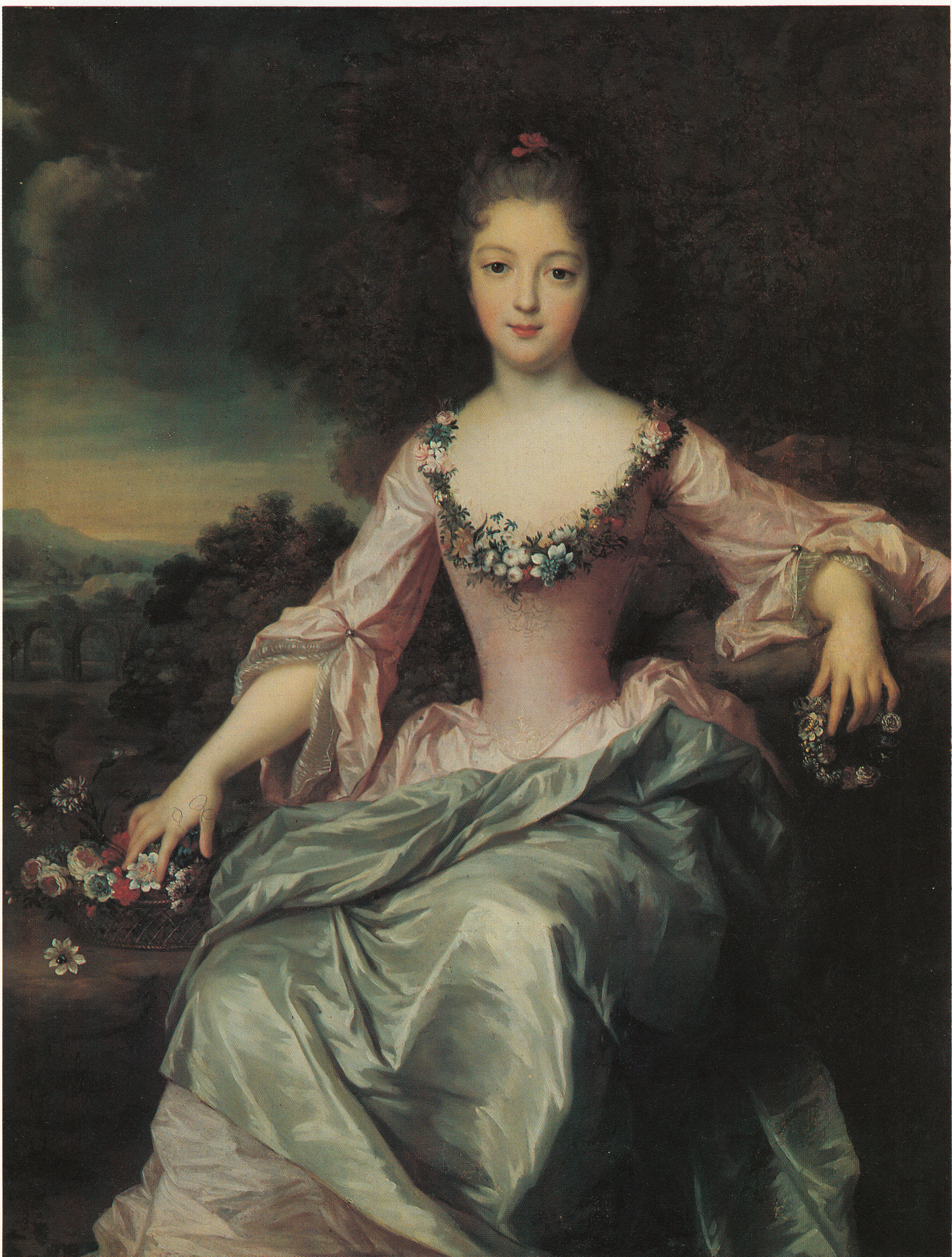
Portrait of Marie Anne in 1720 (by Gustaf Lundberg, after Jean-Baptiste Santerre)

The fourth daughter and the fifth child of her parents, she shared her name with her eldest sister, Marie Anne Éléonore. She was born at the Hôtel de Condé in Paris and was baptised there on 29 August 1700. Marie Anne also shared her name with an aunt, Marie Anne, who became the Duchess of Vendôme after her marriage to Louis Joseph, Duke of Vendôme in 1710.

Marie Anne was said to have been the fruit of her mother's affair with François Louis, Prince of Conti. Her mother, who had an amorous nature, had been having an affair with the prince in the time leading up to the birth of Marie Anne. François Louis's wife, Marie Thérèse de Bourbon, was the sister of Marie-Anne's mother's husband. Together, the Conti couple had been the titular monarchs of Poland during the year of Marie Anne's birth.

Her first cousin, Marie Louise Élisabeth d'Orléans (1695–1719) married Charles de France, duc de Berry in 1710. Upon her marriage, Marie Louise Élisabeth assumed the rank of Granddaughter of France and became entitled to her own household. Marie Anne was chosen to be one of her ladies-in-waiting. After the death of her husband, Marie Louise Élisabeth led a life of "debauchery" at the Palais du Luxembourg and the Château de La Muette. Her numerous lovers and repeated pregnancies soon gave her the reputation of a Messalina. These libertine scandals was reportedly the reason for Marie Anne to resign her post.

Marie Anne secretly married her lover, the Louis de Melun, the Duke of Joyeuse, in 1719. Her husband was the son of the Louis de Melun, the Prince of Épinoy and a princess Élisabeth Thérèse de Lorraine. Louis was also a great great grandson of Gabrielle d'Estrées. He was married to Armande de La Tour d'Auvergne, a daughter of the Duke of Bouillon and grand daughter of Marie Anne Mancini (she died in 1717). In 1724, during a hunting party at Marie Anne's ancestral home, the Château de Chantilly, Louis disappeared and his body was never found. Naturally distraught, Marie Anne never married again. She was never to have any children.

In 1725, she became Surintendante de la Maison de la Reine of the new Polish-born queen, Marie Leszczyńska. She was secured this post thanks to her brother Louis Henri, Duke of Bourbon who had helped secure the marriage of Maria to Louis XV. At the death of her cousin Louise Diane d'Orléans in 1736 after a difficult childbirth (the child was a stillborn), Marie Anne was asked to go to the Château d'Issy to represent the Queen in honour of Louise Diane's early death.

Marie Anne held her post until her death in 1741. She died of inflamed bowels at the hôtel du Petit Luxembourg. Like her sisters, Louise Anne and Élisabeth Alexandrine, she was buried in the Carmelite Convent of the Faubourg Saint-Jacques in Paris.

Her portrait en Sultane, by Jean-Marc Nattier (1733), "justifying her chic state of undress" (Wallace Collection, London) is a famous example of turquerie.

== Ancestry ==
Ancestors of Marie Anne de Bourbon

16. Henri II, Prince of Condé
8. Louis II, Prince of Condé
17. Charlotte Marguerite de Montmorency
4. Henri Jules, Prince of Condé
18. Urbain de Maillé, marquis de Brézé
9. Claire-Clémence de Maillé-Brézé
19. Nicole du Plessis de Richelieu
2. Louis III, Prince of Condé
20. Frederick V, Elector Palatine
10. Edward, Count Palatine of Simmern
21. Elizabeth Stuart
5. Anne Henriette of Bavaria
22. Charles Gonzaga, Duke of Mantua and Montferrat
11. Anne Gonzaga
23. Catherine of Mayenne
1. Marie Anne de Bourbon
24. Henry IV of France
12. Louis XIII of France
25. Marie de' Medici
6. Louis XIV of France
26. Philip III of Spain and II of Portugal
13. Anne of Austria
27. Margaret of Austria
3. Louise Françoise de Bourbon
28. Gaspard de Rochechouart, marquis de Mortemart
14. Gabriel de Rochechouart, duc de Mortemart
29. Louise de Maure, comtesse de Maure
7. Madame de Montespan
30. Jean de Grandseigne, marquis de Marsillac
15. Diane de Grandseigne
31. Catherine de La Béraudière, dame de Villenon

Court offices
Preceded by Françoise-Athénaïs, marquise de Montespan	Surintendante de la Maison de la Reine to the Queen of France; 1725–1741	Succeeded by Marie Thérèse Louise of Savoy, Princesse de Lamballe
