= Anthony Alsop =

Anthony Alsop was born about 1670 and died in Winchester on 10 June 1726. He was a clergyman and Neo-Latin poet who sided with the Tory Party at the end of the Stuart era. His poetry was admired at the time but was eventually forgotten until a recent interest in such work brought him to notice again.

== Life ==
Alsop was born at Darley Dale in Derbyshire and educated at Westminster School. Going on to Christ Church, Oxford, in 1690, he took the degrees of Bachelor of Arts in 1695 and Master of Arts in 1697. While there he gained a reputation for his elegant Latin verse, some of it produced for public university occasions, some for private circulation, and some Jacobite in spirit. His speciality was the witty verse epistle, most often using the Sapphic stanza.

In 1698 Alsop edited a selection of Aesop’s Fables in Latin verse, Fabularum Aesopicarum Delectus. It contains 237 fables in Latin, with the original Greek of the first 158, the Hebrew of the next 10, the Arabic of the next 8, whilst the other 60 are in Latin only. Two of his satirical epistles on Oxford figures were printed in broadsheet form in 1706, the year in which he gained the degree of Bachelor of Divinity and through patronage was made a prebendary at Winchester Cathedral, with the rectory of Brightwell in Berkshire. After Alsop married in 1716, he was sued for breach of promise by his mistress and, having lost the case, had to flee abroad for a while. He died in an accident at his home in 1726 with the reputation of an agreeable and witty companion, a learned preacher and a fine lyric poet, although his loose manner of living and sometimes bawdy verse had kept him confined to a small circle of admirers.

== Poetry ==
Alsop left many Latin odes in manuscript which were published in 1752 by his stepson Francis Bernard as Antonii Alsopi, Aedis Christi Olim Alumni, Odarum Libri Duo. In the introduction it is claimed that the author was "esteemed inferior only to his master Horace," a judgment that Alexander Pope seems to second in his line in the Dunciad, "[Let] Alsop never but like Horace joke" (IV.224). In addition Alsop published some slight poems in English in magazines, of which four addresses to "Chlorinda" appeared in Robert Dodsley’s Collection of Poems in Six Volumes (1782).

The humorous nature of his Latin writing can be gained from some of the personal epistles he wrote. That written to the aristocratic archdeacon Henry Bridges in 1721 contains the satirical advice to trim his High church religious views to those of the new Hanoverian establishment:

Be wise at last, and learn those skills
by which to be accounted great and good.
Let the pattern of worship be everywhere free,

unconfined by law;

let each have his own faith and mind,
under no leader or guidance, for who can
bear the imperious yoke of the clergy,

or priestly control?"

Another to the lawyer Joseph Taylor begins with a Horatian invitation to supper but then playfully adapts the Latin to the contemporary situation of enjoying smuggled goods: "I have a little bottle of wine (vasculum Bacchi), brought by a friendly ship, without the knowledge of the customs officer (clam quaestore)." Another poem warns him of the tedious and expensive process of bribing his way into Parliament, when "you must furrow your way through a great ocean of liquor, many clouds of smoke must pour out and a perpetual flow of ale."

The two books of Alsop's odes was not reprinted and he was forgotten until a biographical and critical study of him, with a modern edition of the Latin and English poems, was published in 1998.
