= Louis, Prince of Condé =

Louis, Prince of Condé may refer to:

- Louis I, Prince of Condé (1530-1569), Huguenot leader and general
- Louis, Grand Condé (Louis II, 1621–1686), general
- Louis III, Prince of Condé (1668–1710), soldier
