= Charles, Count of Charolais =

Charles, Count of Charolais may refer to:

- Charles the Bold, Count of Charolais from 1433 and Duke of Burgundy from 1467
- Charles V, Holy Roman Emperor, Count of Charolais from 1530 to 1558
- Charles III of Spain, Count of Charolais from 1665 to 1684
- Charles de Bourbon, Count of Charolais from 1710 to 1760
