= Surintendante de la Maison de la Reine =

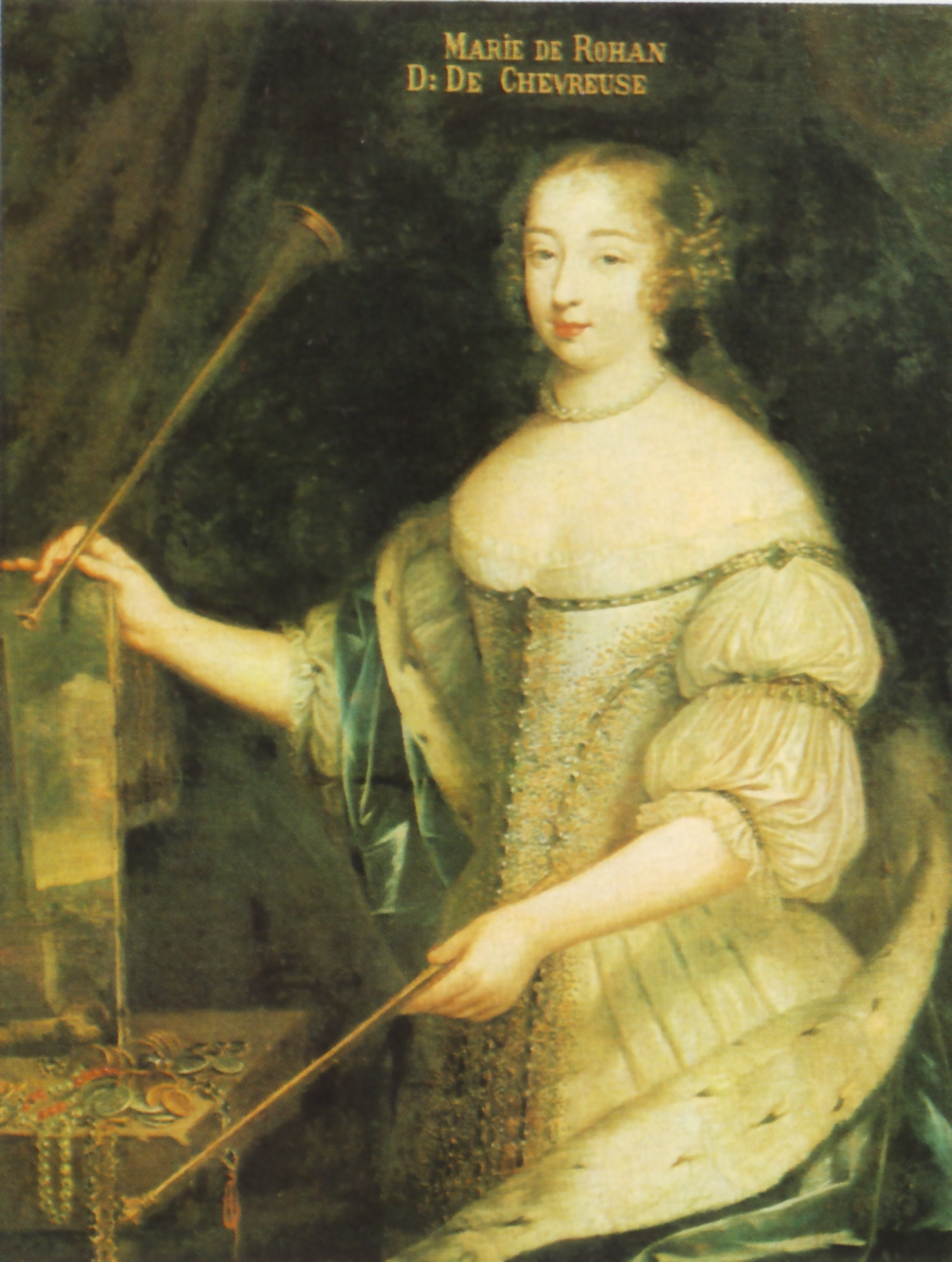
Marie de Chevreuse, for whom the post of Surintendante de la Maison de la Reine was created in 1619.

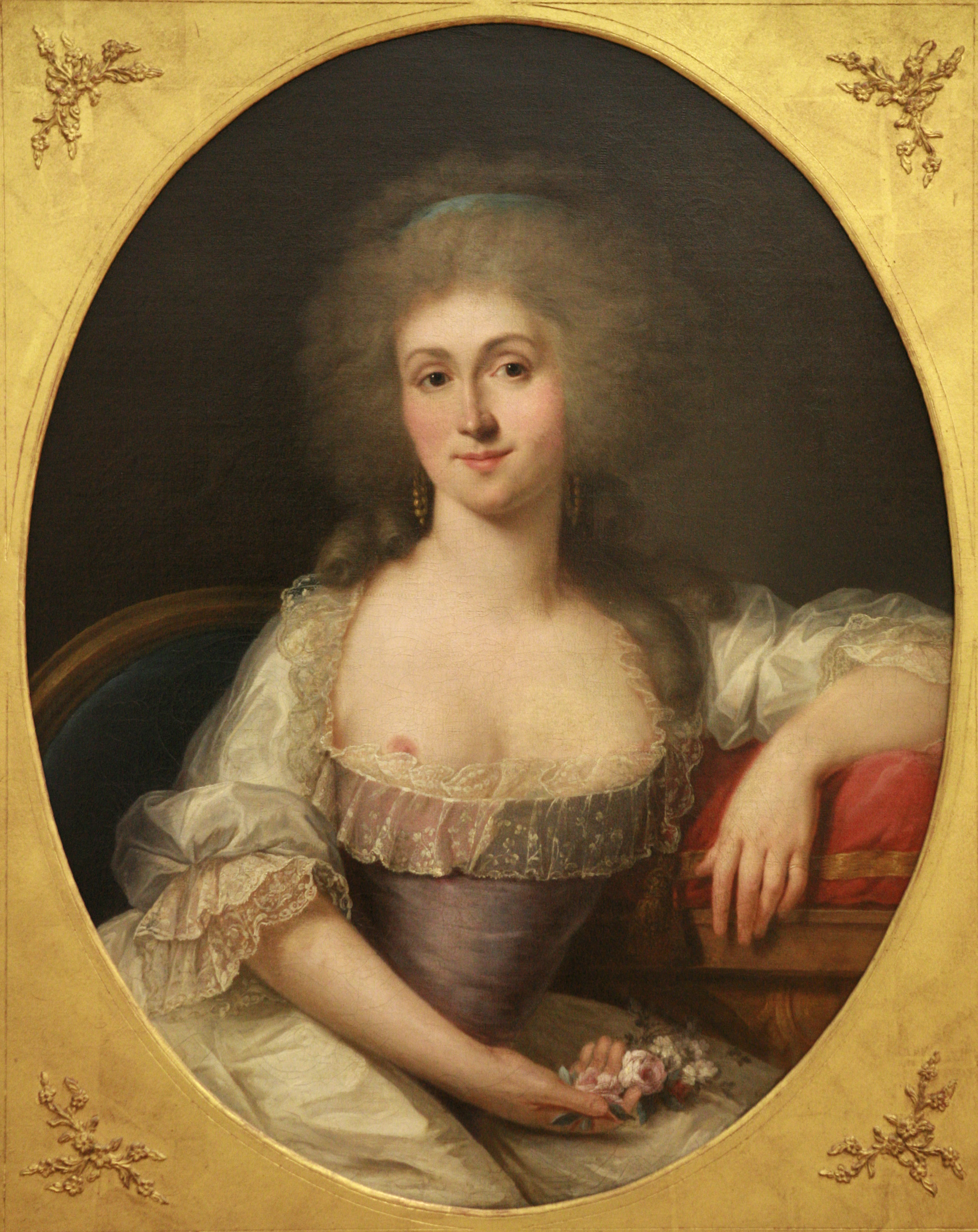
Marie Louise Thérèse de Savoie de Carignan, princesse de Lamballe by Joseph Duplessis

Surintendante de la Maison de la Reine (French pronunciation: [syʁɛ̃tɑ̃dɑ̃t də la mɛzɔ̃ də la ʁɛn], lit. 'Superintendent of the Queen's Household'), or only Surintendante, was the senior lady-in-waiting at the royal court of France from 1619 until the French revolution. The Surintendante was selected from the members of the highest French nobility.

== History ==
The office was created in 1619. The Surintendante and the Governess of the Children of France were the only female office holders in France to give an oath of loyalty to the King himself.

The surintendante had about the same tasks as the Première dame d'honneur: receiving the oath of the female personnel before they took office and supervising them and the queen's daily routine, as well as organizing the accounts and staff list, but she was placed in rank above the première dame d'honneur. Whenever the surintendante was absent, she was replaced by the première dame d'honneur. The post of surintendante could be left vacant for long periods, and was abolished between the death of Marie Anne de Bourbon in 1741 and the appointment of the Princesse de Lamballe in 1775.

During the Second French Empire, the Grande-Maitresse of Empress Eugénie de Montijo was the equivalent of the Surintendante, being formally the highest female official at court but in practice with the same tasks as the dame d'honneur; this position was held by Anne d'Essling during that entire period (1853–1870).

== List of surintendante to the queen of France ==
=== Anne of Austria, 1619–1666 ===
- 1619–1637: Marie de Rohan
- 1657–1666: Anne Marie Martinozzi, Princess of Conti

=== Maria Theresa of Spain, 1660–1683 ===
- 1660–1661: Anne Gonzaga
- 1661–1679: Olympia Mancini, Countess of Soissons
- 1679–1683: Françoise-Athénaïs de Rochechouart, Marquise de Montespan

=== Marie Leszczyńska, 1725–1768 ===
- 1725–1741: Marie Anne de Bourbon
- 1741–1768: Abolished

=== Marie Antoinette, 1775–1792 ===
- 1775–1792: Marie Thérèse Louise of Savoy, Princesse de Lamballe

== See also ==
- Mistress of the Robes, British equivalent
- Camarera mayor de Palacio, Spanish equivalent
- Chief Court Mistress, Dutch, German, Scandinavian and Russian equivalent
