= Louise Anne de Bourbon =

- Mademoiselle de Charolais
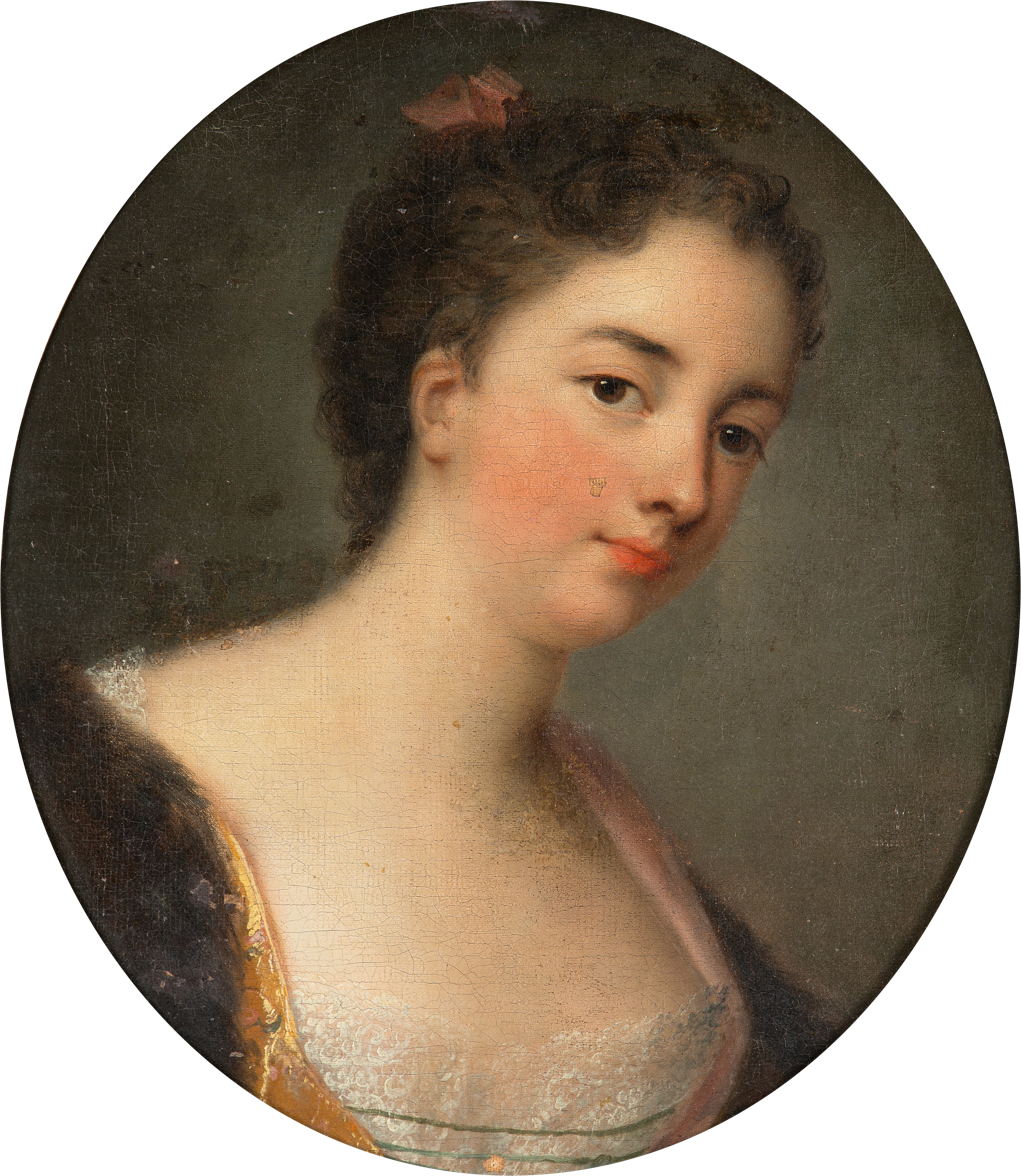
- Portrait after Rosalba Carriera
- Born: 23 June 1695; Palace of Versailles, Île-de-France, France
- Died: 8 April 1758 (aged 62); Hôtel de Rothelin-Charolais, Paris, France
- Burial: Carmel du faubourg Saint-Jacques, Paris, France
- House: Bourbon-Condé
- Father: Louis III, Prince of Condé
- Mother: Louise-Françoise de Bourbon
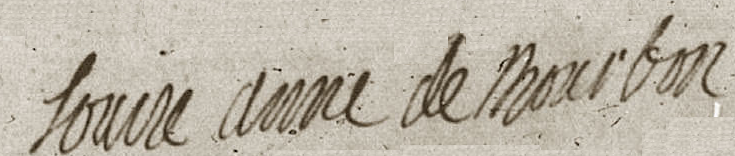
- Signature

Louise Anne de Bourbon, Mademoiselle de Charolais (23 June 1695 – 8 April 1758) was a French princess, the daughter of Louis III, Prince of Condé. Her father was the grandson of Louis, Grand Condé, while her mother, Louise Françoise de Bourbon, was the eldest surviving legitimised daughter of Louis XIV and his maîtresse-en-titre, Madame de Montespan.

== Biography ==
=== Early life ===
Born at the Palace of Versailles, Louise Anne was the fourth child and third daughter of her parents. Her eldest sisters were Marie Anne Gabrielle Éléonore de Bourbon and Louise Élisabeth de Bourbon. She was baptised in the chapel of Versailles on 24 November 1698 with her brother Louis Henri and her sister Louise Élisabeth.

Louise Anne's father died in 1710, eleven months after having inherited the title of Prince de Condé at the death of his own father. Since her first cousin, Louis d'Orléans, never had a daughter who survived into adulthood, Louise Anne became known at court by the style of Mademoiselle, which she held from 1728 when Louis' daughter, Louise Marie d'Orléans, died at the age of one.

=== During the Regency ===
During the Régence of her cousin, Philippe II, Duke of Orléans, she became romantically involved with the Duke of Richelieu, a grandnephew of Cardinal Richelieu. At the same time, the Duke of Richelieu also began an affair with Louise Anne's first cousin, Charlotte Aglaé d'Orléans, known at court as Mademoiselle de Valois. The two cousins, rivals in love, would later both fight fiercely, but separately, for the liberation of the duke from his incarceration in the Bastille due to his participation in the Cellamare Conspiracy.

Louise Anne never married. At one time, she was considered as a possible bride for her cousin, Louis Auguste, Prince of Dombes, but she refused. Another proposed husband was the Duke of Chartres, the son of the Regent, and heir to the House of Orléans. His mother, however, wanted a more prestigious marriage for her son with a young German princess.

Voltaire, a friend of Richelieu, wrote the following verse concerning Louise-Anne:

Frère ange de Charolois
Dis-nous par quelle aventure
Le cordon de Saint François
Sert à Vénus de ceinture.

=== Reign of Louis XV ===
As the years passed, Louise Anne constantly intrigued for political prominence. She would later help her cousin Louis XV in his search for new mistresses. It was common gossip at the time that Louise Anne was actually one of the king's former mistresses; that she was his first unofficial sexual partner after his wife, possibly as early as the late 1720s, and that they had an on-and-off-affair for a few years and that she introduced him to prospective new mistresses. However, other contemporaries claim that while Louise Anne did wish to become his lover and did attempt to seduce him, she never actually succeeded to become his mistress. The king did, in any case, enjoy her company, and she belonged to his circle of personal friends and frequently attended court. Louise Anne's older sister, Louise Élisabeth, introduced Madame de Pompadour to the French court in the 1740s.

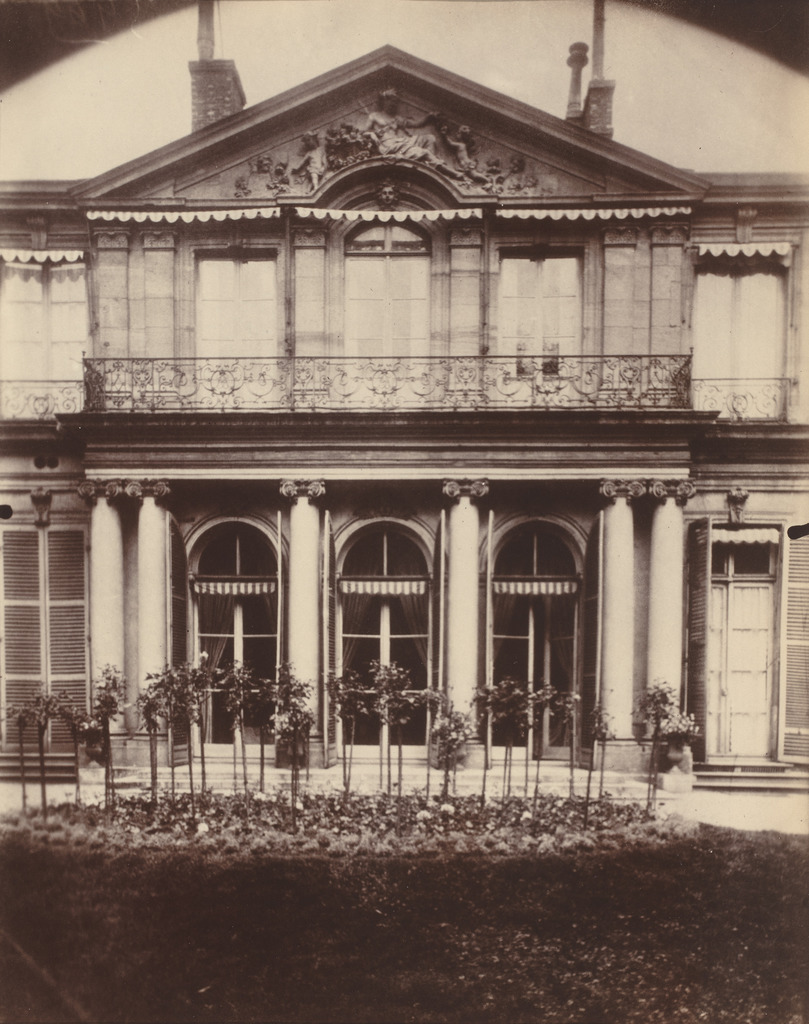
The Hôtel de Rothelin-Charolais

Louise Anne owned several estates. In 1735, she became the owner of the Hôtel de Rothelin-Charolais in Paris, which became her townhouse. She would later sell the lands at Vallery, in the Bourgogne province of France, which had been the traditional burial place of her Condé ancestors. She also owned various châteaux such as the one at Athis outside Paris. She later sold the estate of Charolais to the Crown and in return got land in Palaiseau, which further augmented her personal real estate holdings.

Louise Anne died in Paris, at the Hôtel de Rothelin-Charolais, at the age of sixty-two. She was buried in the Carmelite Convent of the Faubourg Saint-Jacques. Her brother, Louis Henri, Duke of Bourbon, and her two sisters, Marie Anne de Bourbon and Élisabeth Alexandrine de Bourbon, were also buried there.

== Ancestry ==
Ancestors of Louise Anne de Bourbon

16. Henri II, Prince of Condé
8. Louis II, Prince of Condé
17. Charlotte Marguerite de Montmorency
4. Henri Jules, Prince of Condé
18. Urbain de Maillé, 1st Marquis of Brézé
9. Claire-Clémence de Maillé-Brézé
19. Nicole du Plessis de Richelieu
2. Louis III, Prince of Condé
20. Frederick V, Elector Palatine
10. Edward, Count Palatine of Simmern
21. Elizabeth Stuart
5. Anne Henriette of Bavaria
22. Charles Gonzaga, Duke of Mantua and Montferrat
11. Anne Gonzaga
23. Catherine of Lorraine
1. Louise Anne de Bourbon
24. Henry IV of France
12. Louis XIII of France
25. Marie de' Medici
6. Louis XIV of France
26. Philip III of Spain and II of Portugal
13. Anne of Austria
27. Margaret of Austria
3. Louise Françoise de Bourbon
28. Gaspard de Rochechouart, marquis de Mortemart
14. Gabriel de Rochechouart, duc de Mortemart
29. Louise de Maure, comtesse de Maure
7. Madame de Montespan
30. Jean de Grandseigne, marquis de Marsillac
15. Diane de Grandseigne
31. Catherine de La Béraudière, dame de Villenon
