= Jeanne Agnès Berthelot de Pléneuf, marquise de Prie =

French noblewoman (1698–1727)

Madame de Prie
- Marquise de Prie
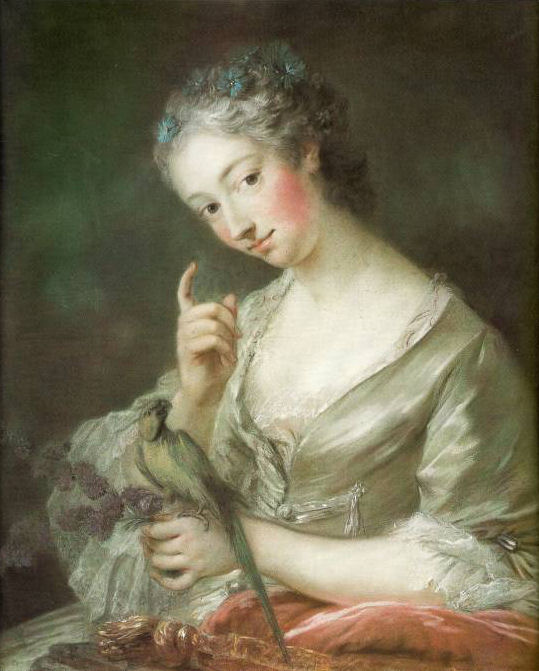
- Madame de Prie after Jean Baptiste Van Loo.
- Full name: Jeanne Agnès Berthelot de Pléneuf
- Born: August 1698; Paris, France
- Died: 7 October 1727 (aged 29); Courbépine, France
- Spouses: Louis, Marquis of Prie
- Issue: none
- Father: Étienne Berthelot de Pléneuf

Jeanne Agnès Berthelot de Pléneuf, marquise de Prie (French: [ʒan aɲɛs bɛʁtəlo də plənœf]; August 1698 – 7 October 1727), was a French noblewoman who for a brief period exercised extraordinary control of the French court during the reign of King Louis XV.

== Early life ==
Jeanne Agnès Berthelot de Pléneuf, Marquise de Prie, is a notable historical figure in early 18th century France for her role in the political machinations. Agnès’s story is an example of the intersection of power, gender, and politics living at a time when women’s influence was exerted behind the thrones of authoritative men.

Born in 1698, Jeanne Agnès presents a glance into the world of French nobility early on in the 18th century. She was the daughter of the wealthy but unscrupulous financier Étienne Berthelot de Pléneuf which shaped an opulent upbringing for her, that enabled her to advance within the upper echelons of French society. However, her upbringing entered her into the rigidly structured French society at the time. Her status set her up for a prominent role in the sphere of politics through the advantageous position of her birthright.

In her time, a strict hierarchical French society was set in place. Her upbringing was during the dominant and long reign of Louis XIV, the Sun King, whose court at Versailles was considered the focal point of both French and European power dynamics. The society was split into three estates: the clergy (First Estate), the nobility (Second Estate), and the commoners (Third Estate). The presence of such a structure exposed her to the complexities of court politics, where power dynamics were in constant disequilibrium. Such a position required a keen skill in social maneuvering, as her status was dependent on pursuing favor with influential figures, such as the king, amidst navigating an environment of conspiracy and competition within the court.

Preparing for her position as a courtier and patron, her upbringing comprised a challenging education for women of her status. Her education emphasized etiquette, achievement in the arts, and languages. It was expected of such women to navigate the intricate societal hierarchies of the court, using their influence discreetly to sway political decisions and organize valuable unions.

Jeanne Agnès's upbringing was thoroughly influenced by the ancient régime's social stratification, in which ancestry and prestige were a key determinant of one’s status in society. Before the impacts that came with the French Revolution, this era was characterized by prosperity for the novel, while the commoners bore the burden of substantial taxation and disregard by society.

== Life at court ==
At the age of 21, she returned to France, from the Savoy where she accompanied her husband, and she was soon the declared mistress of Louis Henri, Duke of Bourbon ("Monsieur le Duc"), who was prime minister at the beginning of the reign of Louis XV (1723–1726). Being the mistress of the prime minister allowed her to have unprecedented power for a woman in the French court. During his ministry she dominated the royal court, one of the most prominent and historically significant actions she took during this time was facilitating the marriage of Louis XV to Marie Leszczynska who became a very beloved and popular Queen of France for the masses of the third estate all throughout her near 43 year tenure. Queen Marie earned the nickname "The Good Queen" due to her extensive charitable works for the poor people of France whom she regarded as her "children". Among of her initial choices before the Polish princess was Anne of Great Britain and Mademoiselle de Vermandois, the younger sister of the Duke of Bourbon. The prime minister and the Marquise de Prie are thought to have picked Marie Leszczynska as the future queen in order to gain future power for themselves.

Following the marriage between Marie and King Louis, Berthelot de Pléneuf struck up a friendship with the young queen. This would lead to a two-year-long companionship in which the Marquise de Prie and the prime minister were able to orchestrate political change in their favor. In 1725, at the time of Louis XV's marriage, she brought Voltaire to court. Thanks to her and with the intervention of the young Queen Marie Leczinska, three pieces by Voltaire were included in the wedding festivities. Overall scholarly articles support that Berthelot de Pléneuf was highly disliked in French society, viewed as conceited, and her political ambition made her unpopular amongst other ladies at court.

Two years after orchestrating the marriage to Marie Leszczynska, both the Duke of Bourbon and the Marquise de Prie were exiled after they planned to get rid of the rival of the Duke – Cardinal Fleury. In this plan, they manipulated the queen that the king was the one who wanted the Cardinal gone. This plan backfired as King Louis XV found out that the Cardinal was to be sent away. After discovering that Berthelot de Pléneuf and the Duke of Bourbon were behind this they were both exiled. Fleury replaced Bourbon as prime minister. Historical evidence has no record of the relationship between Berthelot de Pléneuf and the Duke continuing after their punishment.

== End of life ==
During her last weeks, The Marquise's personal life has been stated to be filled with suffering and isolation. Quickly after her exile and the death of her father, her mental and physical health rapidly deteriorated. She began to go blind and contracted tuberculosis. She sought help from different doctors, but they dismissed her condition as hysteria. She prepared for her death by making changes to her will. On September 19, she added a codicil to her will, revoking donations to certain individuals and leaving everything to her children. Twelve days later, she became bedridden with pain that lasted for four days until her death.

As the Marquise succumbed to her downfall, Jeanne died on October 7, 1727. The cause of her death remains uncertain. The belief that the Marquise committed suicide comes from a single contemporary who was known to dislike the Marquise and was a hypochondriac, and who had grievances against various ministers and favorites, including the Duc. An alternative perspective is given in a biography written by Henri Thirion. Thirion suggests that there were also natural causes at play. According to this perspective, the Marquise had requested a sedative that contained opium, which was seen as a poison by those around her. The small dose she took was to temporarily relieve her. Her illness ended up worsening, which resulted in convulsions and eclampsia for a few years leading up to her death. Thirion adds that while traveling by carriage near Courbépine, her horses spooked, causing the carriage to overturn. The broken windows caused severe injuries, ultimately leading to her death. The text suggests that her emotional state, overexertion, and pre-existing illness contributed to her demise.

After her death, the Marquise was still seen as a threat. Her adversaries, particularly Fleury, resorted to maligning her character to discredit the prime minister. They accused her of various infamies, such as greed and promiscuity. By making her disliked by the public and presenting her as a danger to the state, they forced the prince to disassociate himself from her, and as a result, Madame de Prie and the Duc retreated from the political scene.

== References in popular culture ==
Outward discontent of the Marquise continued for generations. Fueled by her family and friends abandoning her quickly after her exile and death, information on Jeanne Agnes Berthelot, Madame Prie remains limited. A few found media sources that cover her life or are based on her include:

Her exile from the court and suicide are the subject of a short fictional work by Stefan Zweig, "Geschichte eines Unterganges" or "Story of a Downfall" (1910).

At the start of Alexandre Dumas' drama Mademoiselle de Belle-Isle (1839), the Duke of Richelieu breaks off a relationship with the Marquise de Prie while the latter is titular mistress of the Duke of Bourbon.

Charlotte Rampling played de Prie in the 1996 TV movie La dernière fête, titled in English The Fall of the Marquise de Prie.

== Sources ==
- M.H. Thirion, Madame de Prie (Paris, 1905).
