= Élisabeth Alexandrine de Bourbon =

- Mademoiselle de Sens
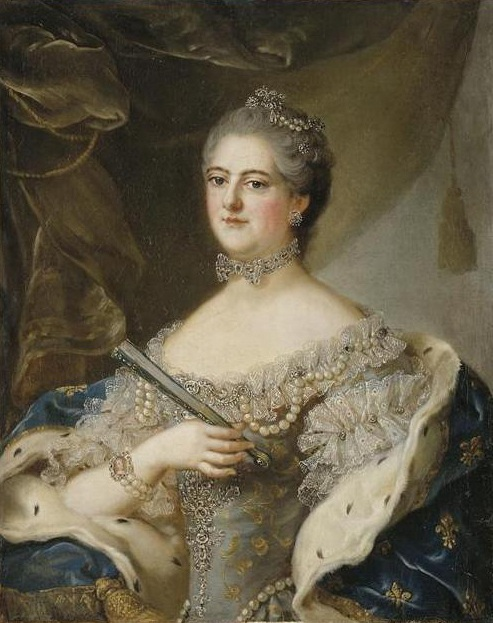
- Portrait of Élisabeth Alexandrine by Jean-Marc Nattier
- Born: 5 September 1705; Hôtel de Condé, Paris, France
- Died: 15 April 1765 (aged 59); Paris, France
- Burial: Carmel du faubourg Saint-Jacques, Paris, France
Names
- Élisabeth Thérèse Alexandrine de Bourbon
- House: Bourbon-Condé
- Father: Louis III, Prince of Condé
- Mother: Louise-Françoise de Bourbon

Élisabeth Alexandrine de Bourbon (Élisabeth Thérèse Alexandrine; 5 September 1705 – 15 April 1765) was a French princess of the blood and a daughter of Louis III, Prince of Condé. Her father was the grandson of the Grand Condé and her mother, Madame la Duchesse, the eldest surviving daughter of Louis XIV and his maîtresse-en-titre, Madame de Montespan.

== Biography ==
=== Early life ===
Élisabeth Alexandrine was born in Paris on 5 September 1705, as was one of nine children and her parents' youngest daughter. Named in honour of her older sister Louise Élisabeth and her uncle Louis Alexandre de Bourbon (Count of Toulouse), she was known by her second name of Alexandrine.

From birth, she was known at court as Mademoiselle de Gex but would later take on the courtesy title of Mademoiselle de Sens. She was known as Mlle de Sens most of her life. As a princesse du sang, Alexandrine was addressed with the style of Her Serene Highness.

Like most of her sisters, she would never marry. She was considered as a possible bride for her older cousin, Louis d'Orléans, but her aunt, the proud Duchess of Orléans, wanted a more prestigious bride for her son. In 1725, she as well as her sister Henriette-Louise was among the women suggested by her brother, the then Prime minister, as queen of France by marriage to Louis XV. She was one of the final four seriously considered candidates when the original list of 99 princesses was first reduced to seventeen and then to four, leaving her and her sister alongside Anne, Princess Royal and Princess of Orange and Princess Amelia of Great Britain as the final alternatives—and when the two British princesses were removed from the list because of religious issues, she and her sister were the only two remaining candidates. Her brother the Prime minister finally recommended her sister Henriette before her, because he considered Henriette to be more attractive than Alexandrine. In the end, her sister was also refused and Maria Leszczyńska, one the candidates removed when the list was reduced to 17, was chosen instead.

=== Adult life ===
Élisabeth Alexandrine was never to play a very prominent political role. She was, however, a great friend of the king's mistress, the famous Madame de Pompadour, who had been introduced at court by Alexandrine's older sister and namesake, Louise Élisabeth.

Like her older sister, Louise Anne, she owned much land and many private residences outside of the capital. In 1734, she bought the Hôtel de Noirmoutier on the rue de Grenelles in Paris. She also bought much land surrounding the hôtel and considerably enlarged the property. In 1744, she bought the estates and lordships of Villegénis and Igny. She remodelled the Château de Villegénis in 1755. The cost of the remodelling was 430,000 livres. To raise that sum, she sold the estate and seigneurie of Vallery, the traditional burial place of the Condé family, to M. and Mme. de Launay, for 280,000 livres. François Desportes, painter of the king's hunts, supplied large canvases for the appartements.

By the time of her death, she had accumulated a large fortune from the old pensions originally assigned to her cousin, Mademoiselle du Maine (1707–1743), the daughter of Louis Auguste, Duke of Maine and his wife, the famous salon hostess Louise Bénédicte de Bourbon. Élisabeth Alexandrine died in Paris on 15 April 1765, at the age of 59. Her nephew, Louis Joseph de Bourbon, Prince of Condé, was her heir. She was buried at the Carmelite Convent of the Faubourg Saint-Jacques in Paris.

== Ancestry ==
Ancestors of Élisabeth Alexandrine de Bourbon

16. Henri II, Prince of Condé
8. Louis II, Prince of Condé
17. Charlotte Marguerite de Montmorency
4. Henri Jules, Prince of Condé
18. Urbain de Maillé, 1st Marquis de Brézé
9. Claire-Clémence de Maillé-Brézé
19. Nicole du Plessis de Richelieu
2. Louis III, Prince of Condé
20. Frederick V, Elector Palatine
10. Edward, Count Palatine of Simmern
21. Elizabeth Stuart
5. Anne Henriette of Bavaria
22. Charles Gonzaga, Duke of Mantua and Montferrat
11. Anne Gonzaga
23. Catherine of Lorraine
1. Élisabeth Alexandrine de Bourbon
24. Henry IV of France
12. Louis XIII of France
25. Marie de' Medici
6. Louis XIV of France
26. Philip III of Spain and II of Portugal
13. Anne of Austria
27. Margaret of Austria
3. Louise Françoise de Bourbon
28. Gaspard de Rochechouart, marquis de Mortemart
14. Gabriel de Rochechouart, 1st Duke of Mortemart
29. Louise de Maure, comtesse de Maure
7. Madame de Montespan
30. Jean de Grandseigne, marquis de Marsillac
15. Diane de Grandseigne
31. Catherine de La Béraudière, dame de Villenon
