= Charles de Bourbon, Count of Charolais =

French royal; grandson of Louis XIV (1700–1760)

Charles de Bourbon
- Count of Charolais
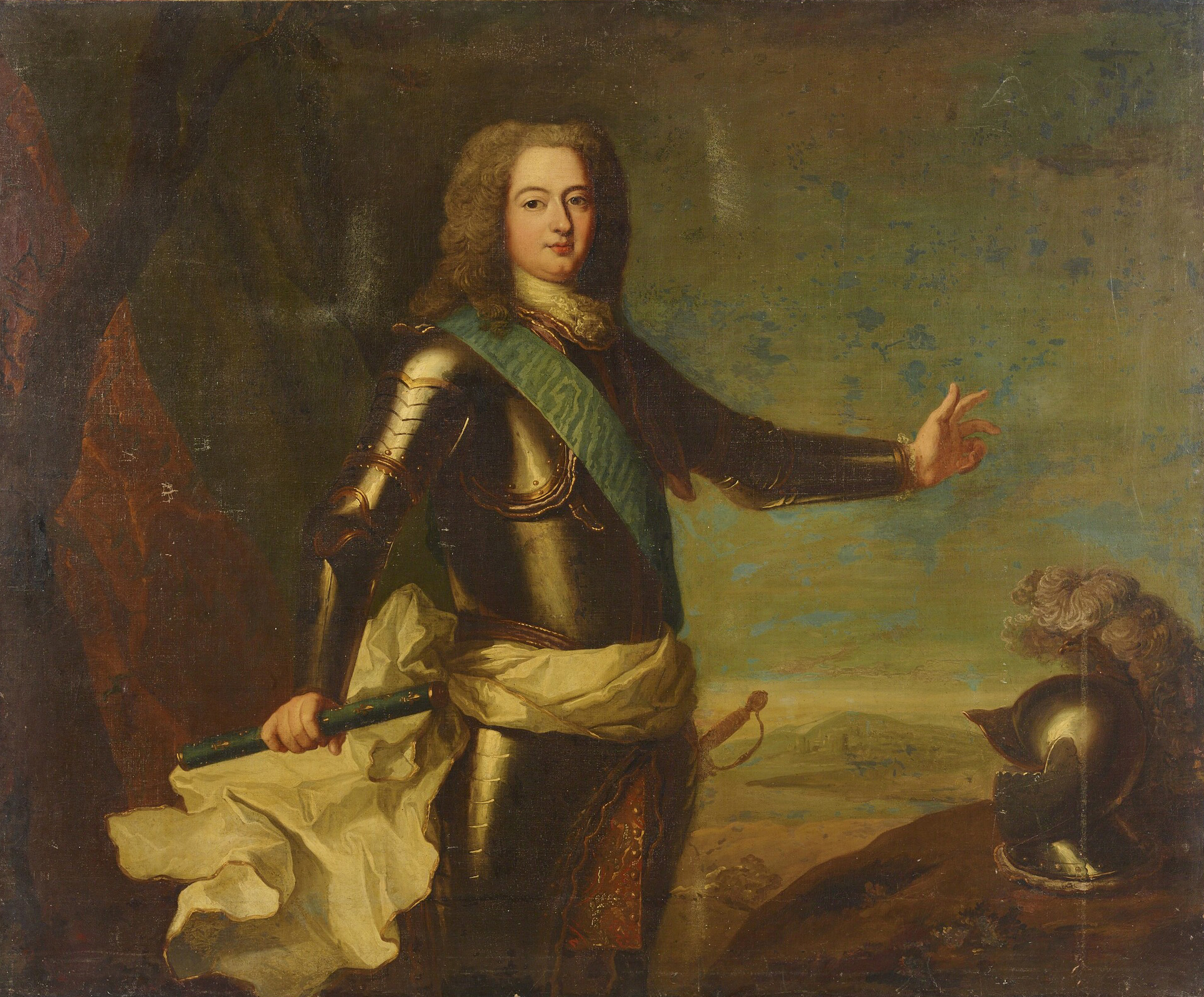
- Born: 19 June 1700; Château de Chantilly, France
- Died: 23 July 1760 (aged 60); Paris, France
- Burial: Église Collégiale Saint-Martin, Montmorency, France
- Issue Detail: Marie Marguerite de Bourbon; Charlotte Marguerite Élisabeth de Bourbon
- House: Bourbon - Condé
- Father: Louis de Bourbon, Prince of Condé
- Mother: Louise-Françoise de Bourbon

Charles de Bourbon, Count of Charolais (19 June 1700 – 23 July 1760) was a French noble. As a member of the reigning House of Bourbon, he was a Prince of the Blood. He was the fifth child and second son of Louis de Bourbon, Prince of Condé and Louise Françoise, Princess of Condé.

== Biography ==
Coat-of-arms of Charles, Count of Charolais

Charles was born at Versailles as the second son of Louis III, Prince of Condé and Louise-Françoise de Bourbon a legitimized daughter of Louis XIV and his mistress Madame de Montespan.

Charles father Louis was considered one of the wealthiest noblemen in France. But he was not so richly endowed physically, as he was very short, had a bilious complexion and suffered from macrocephaly. He was intelligent and well-educated but had an extremely ferocious and arrogant personality.

In 1710, when Charles was just 15 years old, his father died. He was made governor of Touraine in 1720. Charles fought in Hungary in the war against the Ottoman Turks and won distinction at the battle of Belgrade. He was gouverneur of his nephew Louis Joseph, Prince of Condé.

At the age of 20, he had already killed a man; allegedly the man, a citizen of Anet, was shot in the streets by the Charles, "for his entertainment". This resulted in the Regent commenting that although he could not personally punish Charles (due to his rank) he would gladly pay another person to do it. In some contrast to his "lawless" character, Charles was rather good at keeping his economy in order and had a talent for organization. It was he who settled the debts of his nephew when he took charge of his household. The two appeared to have developed quite a good relationship.

== Personal life ==
In 1719 Charles made ouvertures to Rinaldo d'Este, Duke of Modena and Reggio, to marry one of his daughters. He became infatuated with the noblewoman Mlle de Lefranc de Brunpré in 1727, who was the daughter of Louis XV's secretary, Jean-Gérard de Lefranc de Brunpré, seigneur de Baillon.

Charles was known for being a womanizer and he had a number of mistresses such as Mlle Delisle (1696-1758) a dancer at the Paris Opera on whom he lavished money but who was also the target of Charles' physical abuse and ill-treatment by her often drunk lover. Together they had a son who died as an infant at the age of six months after his father made him drink Danzig brandy. Allegedly Charles then said the child was not his since it (drinking alcohol) would not then have caused his death.

Sometime in the 1750s Charles began a relationship with Marie-Marguerite Caron de Rancurel, daughter of an officer Marc-Antoine Caron de Rancurel from Sassenage. Due to the influence of her lover she was given the title of Marquise de la Sône (Dame de Lassone).

== Death ==
On Charles' death, the county of Charolais reverted to the king. Some years later it was granted to a brother of the future Louis Philippe I. He was buried at the Église Collégiale Saint-Martin de Montmorency.

== Children ==
Charles had two illegitimate children with Marie-Marguerite Caron de Rancurel: (1731-1800)

- Marie Marguerite de Bourbon (17 August 1752 – 1830); married Denis Nicolas, Comte de Puget.
- Charlotte Marguerite Élisabeth de Bourbon (1 August 1754 – 12 September 1839); married François Xavier Joseph, Comte de Lowendal (son of Marshal de Lowendal).

It was the Prince de Condé who managed to ensure the legitimization of Charles' two daughters. Charles himself had been dead for nine years when this took place.
