= Louis III, Prince of Condé =

Prince of Condé (1668–1710)

Louis III de Bourbon
- Duke of Bourbon

Prince of Condé
- Tenure: 1 April 1709 - 4 March 1710
- Predecessor: Henri Jules, Prince of Condé
- Successor: Louis Henri I, Prince of Condé
- Born: 10 November 1668; Hôtel de Condé, Paris, France
- Died: 4 March 1710 (aged 41); Hôtel de Condé, Paris, France
- Spouse: Louise Françoise de Bourbon (m. 1685)
- Issue Detail: Marie Anne, Mademoiselle de Bourbon; Louis Henri I, Prince of Condé; Louise Élisabeth, Princess of Conti; Louise Anne, Mademoiselle de Charolais; Marie Anne, Duchess of Joyeuse; Charles, Count of Charolais; Henriette Louise, Mademioselle de Vermandois; Élisabeth Alexandrine, Mademoiselle de Sens; Louis, Count of Clermont
- House: Bourbon-Condé
- Father: Henri Jules, Prince of Condé
- Mother: Anne Henriette of Bavaria

Louis III de Bourbon, Prince of Condé (10 November 1668 – 4 March 1710) was a prince du sang as a member of the reigning House of Bourbon at the French court of Louis XIV. Styled as Duke of Bourbon from birth, he succeeded his father in 1709 as Prince of Condé (French pronunciation: [kɔ̃de]); however, he was still known by the ducal title. He was prince for less than a year.

== Biography ==
=== Birth and family ===
Louis de Bourbon was born at the Hôtel de Condé in Paris on 10 November 1668 to Henri Jules de Bourbon, Prince of Condé and Anne Henriette of Bavaria, and was the grandson of le Grand Condé.

One of nine children, he was his parents' eldest surviving son. His sister, Marie Thérèse de Bourbon, was married to François Louis, Prince of Conti. Another sister, Louise Bénédicte de Bourbon, would marry Louis Auguste, Duke of Maine, a legitimised son of Louis XIV, in 1692. His youngest sister, Marie Anne de Bourbon, much later married the famed general Louis Joseph de Bourbon.

=== Marriage ===
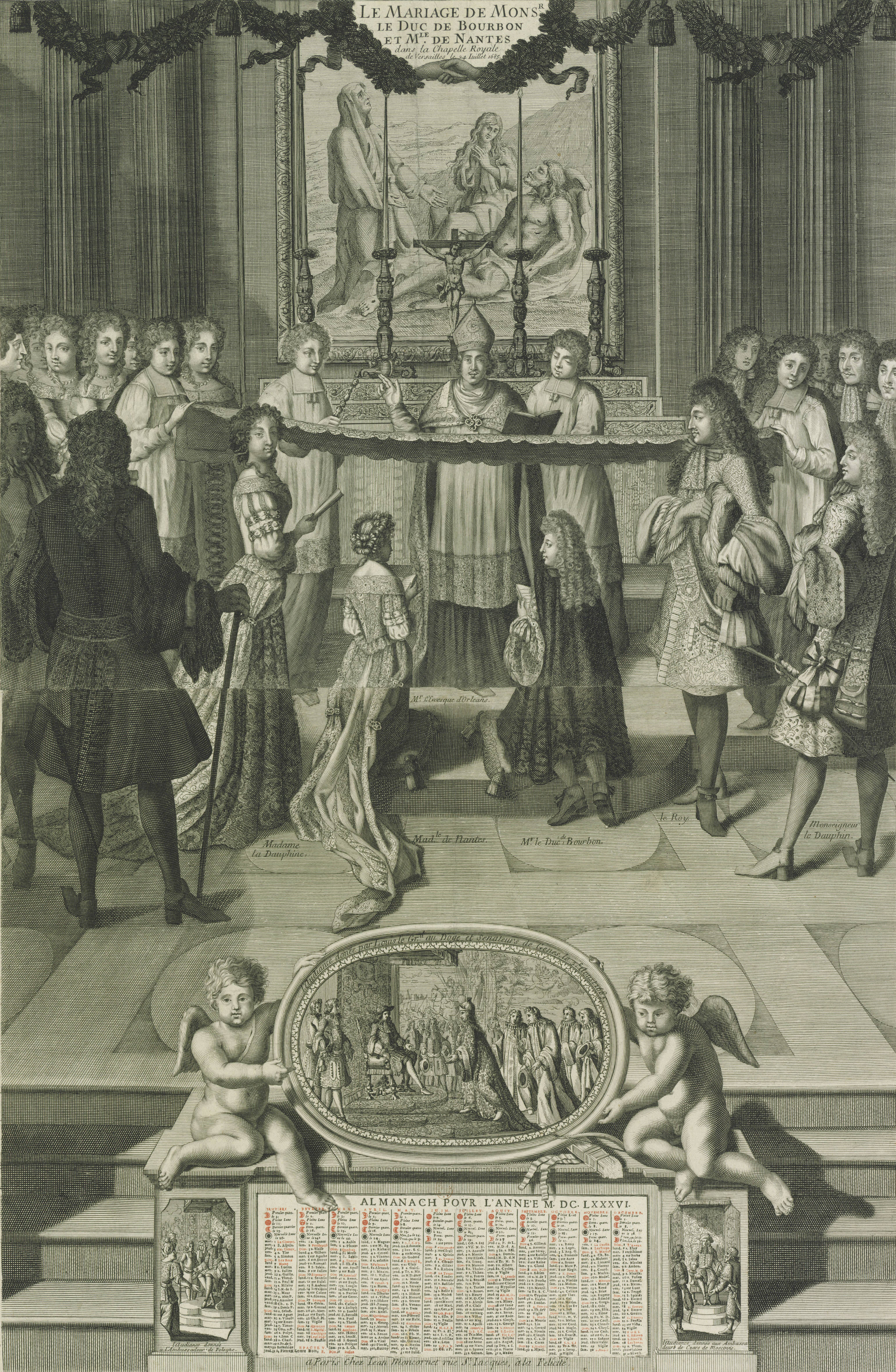
1685 engraving depicting the marriage ceremony of the Duke of Bourbon and Louise Francoise

In June 1684, Louis XIV paid a visit to the Condés in order to demand the hand of the Duke of Bourbon for one of his daughters by Madame de Montespan; Louise Françoise, Mademoiselle de Nantes, who had just reached her eleventh birthday. However, due to this, the arrangement was kept secret until the following April, and on 24 July 1685, they were married. It came as a surprise to the royal court seeing the marriage between a prince du sang and an illegitimate daughter of the king. The head of the House of Condé, le Grand Condé, however, acquiesced to the socially inferior match in the hope of gaining favour with the bride's father, Louis XIV.

The seventeen-year-old duc de Bourbon was known at court as Monsieur le Duc. After the marriage, his wife assumed the style of Madame la Duchesse. Louis was frequently unfaithful to his young wife, who, despite being initially heartbroken, eventually followed him in this path. One author noted that:

She learns that her husband is taking advantage of the Fontainebleau ladies with a few companions and gallop into the carriage to Paris to indulge in debauchery. The king, moved by her sorrow, sends her his physician and reproaches the equerry for not keeping a closer eye on the Duke of Bourbon. Fourteen is not an age for a princess to be so sad.

Like his father, who became Prince of Condé in 1687, Louis led a typical, unremarkable life. In appearance, he was unimpressive in comparison with his wife, famed for her beauty. He was short in stature, and a macrocephalic with a bilious complexion. He was also noted for his lack of intelligence, as well as being notoriously malevolent and offensive Saint-Simon, who disliked Louis, described him as:

[...] a man considerably shorter than the shortest men, who, without being fat, was stout all over, with a surprisingly large head and a frightening face; it was said that he was a dwarf of Madame la Princesse. He was lividly yellow, almost always looking furious, but at the same time so proud, so audacious that it was hard to get used to him. [...] He had wit, was well-read, retained some of an excellent education, and even displayed politeness and grace when he chose to; but he very rarely chose to. He had neither the avarice, nor the injustice, nor the baseness of his ancestors; but he possessed all their valor and showed application and intelligence in war. He also had the malice and all the cunning to increase his rank through subtle usurpations, and even more audacity and impetuosity than they did in attacking.

As a soldier, Louis showed some expertise and participated in the battles of Steenkerque (August 1692) and Neerwinden (1693). In June 1692, he also fought in the siege of Nancy.

=== Prince of Condé ===
Arms of Louis as the Prince of Condé

In early 1709, Louis succeeded his father Henry Jules as prince of Condé, not long before being tasked by him to "carry out all the improvements which he had projected at Chantilly, and to take care that none of the honours due to his rank were omitted at his [Henri Jules's] funeral". Louis, however, had long been suffering from pains in his head, "which tempered the joy he felt at being delivered from his troublesome father". On 3 March 1710, returning home from the Hôtel de Coislin, he suffered a "fit" and was carried unconscious to the Hôtel de Condé. Louis died early in the morning of March 4, 1710, aged just 41, and was buried with his ancestors in Saint-Valery, having never regained consciousness.

== Issue ==
By his marriage to Louise Françoise, Mademoiselle de Nantes, he had nine children, all of whom survived him:

1. Marie Anne Éléonore de Bourbon, Mademoiselle de Bourbon (22 December 1690 - 30 August 1760); became a nun.
2. Louis Henri I, Prince of Condé (18 August 1692 - 27 January 1740); married Marie Anne de Bourbon and had no issue. He later married Princess Caroline of Hesse-Rotenburg and had issue.
3. Louise Élisabeth de Bourbon (22 November 1693 – 27 May 1775); married Louis Armand, Prince of Conti and had issue.
4. Louise Anne de Bourbon, Mademoiselle de Charolais (23 June 1695 - 8 April 1758); died unmarried.
5. Marie Anne de Bourbon (16 October 1697 - 11 August 1741); secretly married Louis de Melun, Duke of Joyeuse.
6. Charles, Count of Charolais (19 June 1700 - 23 July 1760); secretly married Jeanne de Valois Saint Remy (descendant of Henri II of France) and had illegitimate issue.
7. Henriette Louise de Bourbon, Mademoiselle de Vermandois (15 January 1703 - 19 September 1772); died unmarried.
8. Élisabeth Alexandrine de Bourbon, Mademoiselle de Sens (15 September 1705 - 15 April 1765); died unmarried.
9. Louis, Count of Clermont (15 June 1709 - 16 June 1771); died unmarried.

Louis III, Prince of Condé House of Bourbon Cadet branch of the House of Bourbon Born: 10 November 1668 Died: 4 March 1710
French nobility
Preceded by Henri Jules, Prince of Condé	Duke of Bourbon; 1668–1709	Succeeded by Louis Henri, Duke of Bourbon
Preceded by Henri Jules, Prince of Condé	Prince of Condé; 1709–1710	Succeeded by Louis Henri, Duke of Bourbon
