= Henriette Louise de Bourbon =

- Mademoiselle de Vermandois; Abbess of Beaumont-lès-Tours
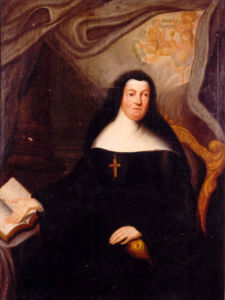
- Born: 15 January 1703; Palace of Versailles, Île-de-France, France
- Died: 19 September 1772 (aged 69); Abbey of Beaumont-lès-Tours, France
- Burial: Abbey of Beaumont-lès-Tours, France
Names
- Henriette Louise Marie Françoise Gabrielle de Bourbon
- House: Bourbon-Condé
- Father: Louis III, Prince of Condé
- Mother: Louise-Françoise de Bourbon
- Religion: Roman Catholic

Henriette Louise de Bourbon (Henriette Louise Marie Françoise Gabrielle; 15 January 1703 – 19 September 1772) was a French princess by birth and a member of the House of Bourbon. She was the abbess of Beaumont-lès-Tours Abbey.

== Biography ==
=== Early life ===
Henriette Louise was born at the Palace of Versailles on 15 January 1703, the seventh child and fifth daughter of Louis III, Prince of Condé and his wife, Louise-Françoise de Bourbon. Henriette Louise's father was a grandson of le Grand Condé, and her mother was the eldest surviving legitimised daughter of King Louis XIV and his mistress, Madame de Montespan. Henriette Louise grew up at Fontevraud Abbey. She was one of nine children.

She acquired the lands of Montond in 1710, but sold them to her sister Louise Anne in 1732.

=== Marriage negotiation ===
In 1725, Henriette Louise as well as her sister Élisabeth Alexandrine was on a list of potential brides presented to King Louis XV. Her name had been placed on the list by her brother, the Duc de Bourbon, who was Louis XV's chief minister. Along with his mistress, Madame de Prie, the duke wanted to make his sister the queen in the hopes of being able to influence the young king. Henriette Louise, however, did not want to marry at all, saying that she instead wanted to become a nun like her cousin Louise Adélaïde d'Orléans.

She was one of the final four seriously considered candidates when the original list of 99 princesses was first reduced to seventeen and then to four, leaving her and her sister alongside Anne, Princess Royal and Princess of Orange and Princess Amelia of Great Britain as the final alternatives—and when the two British princesses were removed from the list because of religious issues, she and her sister became the only two remaining candidates.

Her brother, the Prime minister, finally recommended her before her sister, because he considered Henriette-Louise to be more attractive than Alexandrine. He described her as a beauty, and pointed out that her wish to become a nun was a testament of her virtue and pious nature; her age made it likely that she would be able to secure the succession by bearing children immediately, and her French nationally had the advantage that one did not have to trust a potentially less truthful foreign assurance about her looks and character. The Prime minister finally stated that her rank was sufficient, as she was as much as descendant of Louis XIV as was the Duke of Orléans, who stood in line to the throne.

When the British princesses were ultimately removed from the list, Henriette-Louise was considered to be the final and natural choice, and she was given support of most members of the Royal Council. However, André-Hercule de Fleury was strongly against the match and advised the young king against it. Further more, according to an unverified but well known legend, Madame de Prie visited Henriette-Louise in order to estimate if she could indeed function as the intended ally of herself and the duke at court, but when Henriette-Louise reacted by cursing her as an 'ungodly creature' and the reason to why her brother was hated by all of France for his sin, Madame de Prie retracted her support. The financiers of the duke and Madame de Prie, the firm of the Paris Brothers Joseph Paris Duverney, also had a bad impression of Henriette-Louise as they feared she was too governed by her mother, who could potentially influence her. Because of that, Henriette-Louise was no longer considered a useful ally as queen by her brother. In the end, Henriette-Louise was also refused and Maria Leszczyńska, one of the candidates removed when the list was reduced to 17, was chosen instead.

=== Nun ===
On 14 January 1727, Henriette Louise took the veil at the Abbey of Beaumont-lès-Tours. She became the abbess of the convent in 1733 at the age of thirty. While abbess, she was known as Her Serene Highness, Madame de Bourbon. Beaumont-lès-Tours had previously been under the control of her second cousin, Gabrielle, daughter of Louis Victor de Rochechouart de Mortemart, who was the older brother of Madame de Montespan.

As an abbess, Henriette Louise raised her great-niece, Louise Adélaïde de Bourbon (1757–1824). The young girl had lost her mother, Charlotte de Rohan, at the age of two. Louise Adélaïde later took the veil herself and became the abbess of Remiremont Abbey.

Henriette Louise died at the Abbey of Beaumont-lès-Tours in 1772, having outlived all her siblings except for the Princess of Conti, and was buried there on 8 January.

== Ancestry ==
Ancestors of Henriette Louise de Bourbon

8. Louis II, Prince of Condé
4. Henri Jules, Prince of Condé
9. Claire-Clémence de Maillé-Brézé
2. Louis III, Prince of Condé
10. Edward, Count Palatine of Simmern
5. Anne Henriette of Bavaria
11. Anne Gonzaga
1. Henriette Louise de Bourbon
12. Louis XIII of France
6. Louis XIV of France
13. Anne of Austria
3. Louise Françoise de Bourbon
14. Gabriel de Rochechouart, 1st Duke of Mortemart
7. Madame de Montespan
15. Diane de Grandseigne
