= Marie Anne Éléonore de Bourbon =

Marie Anne Éléonore
- Mademoiselle de Bourbon; Abbess of Saint-Antoine-des-Champs
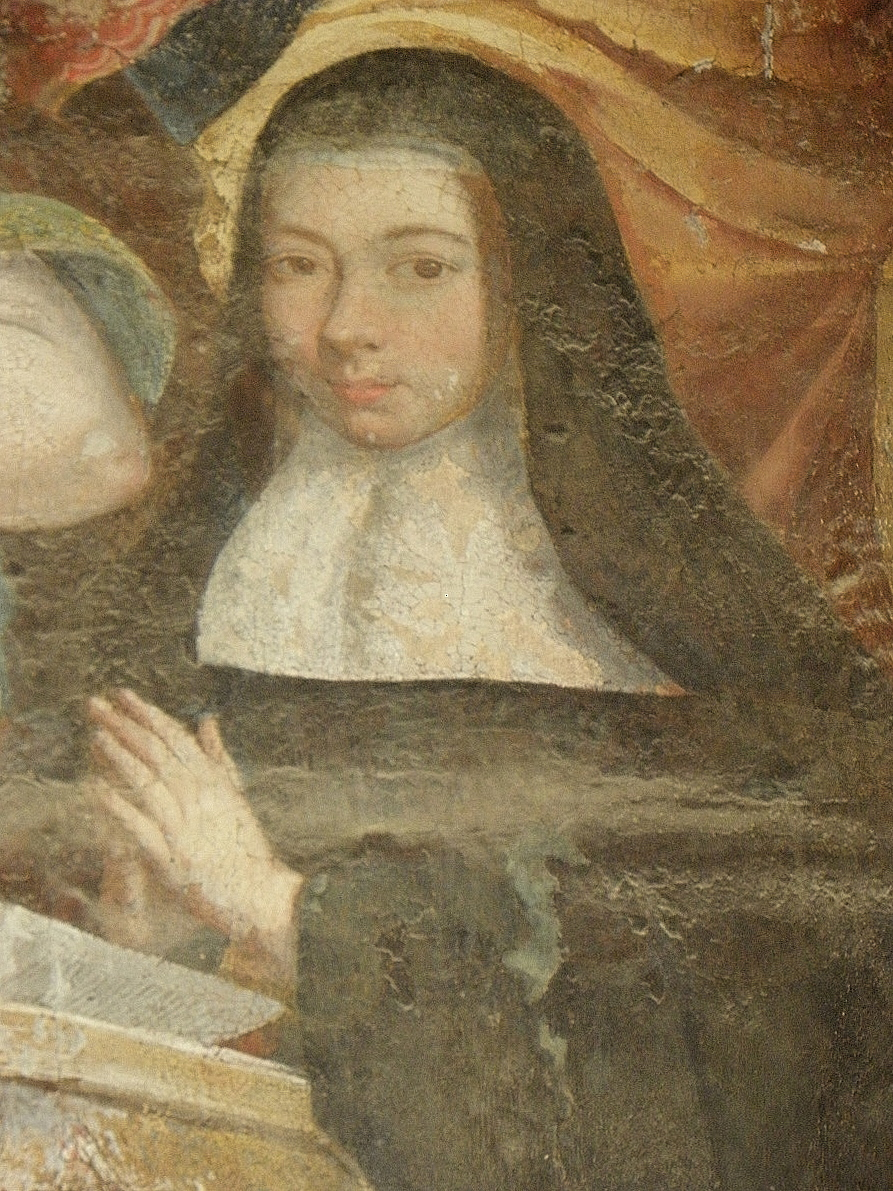
- Born: 22 December 1690; Palace of Versailles, Île-de-France, France
- Died: 30 August 1760 (aged 69); Villejuif, Paris, France
Names
- Marie Anne Éléonore Gabrielle de Bourbon
- House: Bourbon-Condé
- Father: Louis III, Prince of Condé
- Mother: Louise Françoise de Bourbon
- Religion: Roman Catholicism

Marie Anne Éléonore Gabrielle de Bourbon (French pronunciation: [maʁi an eleɔnɔʁ ɡabʁijɛl də buʁbɔ̃]; 22 December 1690 – 30 August 1760) was a daughter of Louis III de Bourbon, Prince of Condé and Louise Françoise, Princess of Condé. She was the Abbess of Saint-Antoine-des-Champs, an abbey in the Villejuif suburb of Paris.

== Biography ==
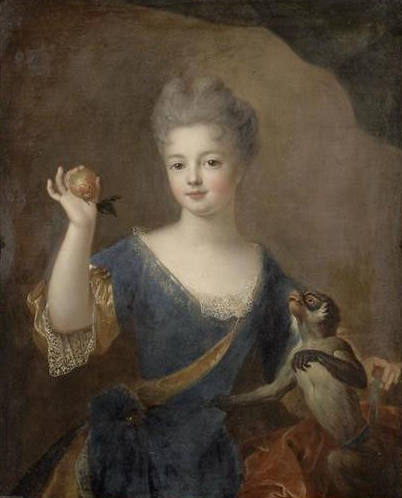
Marie Anne Éléonore as a child, by Pierre Gobert.

Marie Anne was born at the Palace of Versailles to the Duke and Duchess of Bourbon. The eldest child of her parents she was known as Mademoiselle de Bourbon in her youth.

Marie Anne Eléonores mother who was seen as one of the beauties at court and with a vivacious personality, had an affair with François Louis de Bourbon, Prince of Conti, the brother-in-law of her older half-sister, Marie Anne de Bourbon, in 1695. François Louis' wife was the pious Marie Thérèse de Bourbon; Marie Thérèse was in turn the oldest sister of Louise Françoise's husband. The affair was facilitated by Louise Francoise half.-brother Louis, the Grand Dauphin who allowed the couple to meet in secret at Meudon. Because of this it was rumored that Marie Anne was the result of this affair.

In her early years she was close to her mother but was later replaced by her sister Louise Élisabeth de Bourbon. Her father, Louis III de Bourbon, was the grandson of le Grand Condé, and her mother, Louise-Françoise de Bourbon, was the eldest surviving daughter of Louis XIV and his maîtresse-en-titre, Madame de Montespan.

As a member of the reigning House of Bourbon, she was a princesse du sang ("princess of the blood") and was allowed the style of Serene Highness.

On 6 May 1706 at the age of 16, she was made a nun at the Royal Abbey of Fontevraud in Anjou. She was later made the Abbess of Saint-Antoine-des-Champs in 1723 and was known as Madame de Bourbon. Saint-Antoine-des-Champs had been an abbey since the 13th century.

She outlived all of her siblings apart from her sister Dowager Princess of Conti and grand mother of the future Philippe Égalité. Dying in the Parisian suburb of Villejuif, she was buried at the Abbey of Saint-Antoine-des-Champs.

Her sister Henriette Louise de Bourbon was an abbess at Beaumont-lès-Tours and a cousin Louise Adélaïde d'Orléans was the Abbess of Chelles. The Abbey at Saint-Antoine is now the home of the Hôpital Saint-Antoine outside Paris.

== Ancestry ==
Ancestors of Marie Anne Éléonore de Bourbon

16. Henri II, Prince of Condé
8. Louis II, Prince of Condé
17. Charlotte Marguerite de Montmorency
4. Henri Jules, Prince of Condé
18. Urbain de Maillé, marquis de Brézé
9. Claire-Clémence de Maillé-Brézé
19. Nicole du Plessis de Richelieu
2. Louis III, Prince of Condé
20. Frederick V of the Palatinate
10. Edward, Count Palatine of Simmern
21. Elizabeth Stuart
5. Anne Henriette of Bavaria
22. Charles Gonzaga, Duke of Mantua and Montferrat
11. Anne Gonzaga
23. Catherine of Mayenne
1. Marie Anne Éléonore de Bourbon
24. Henry IV of France
12. Louis XIII of France
25. Marie de' Medici
6. Louis XIV of France
26. Philip III of Spain and II of Portugal
13. Anne of Austria
27. Margaret of Austria
3. Louise Françoise de Bourbon
28. Gaspard de Rochechouart, marquis de Mortemart
14. Gabriel de Rochechouart, duc de Mortemart
29. Louise de Maure, comtesse de Maure
7. Madame de Montespan
30. Jean de Grandseigne, marquis de Marsillac
15. Diane de Grandseigne
31. Catherine de La Béraudière, dame de Villenon
