= Corner tower =

Defensive towers built at the corners of castles or fortresse

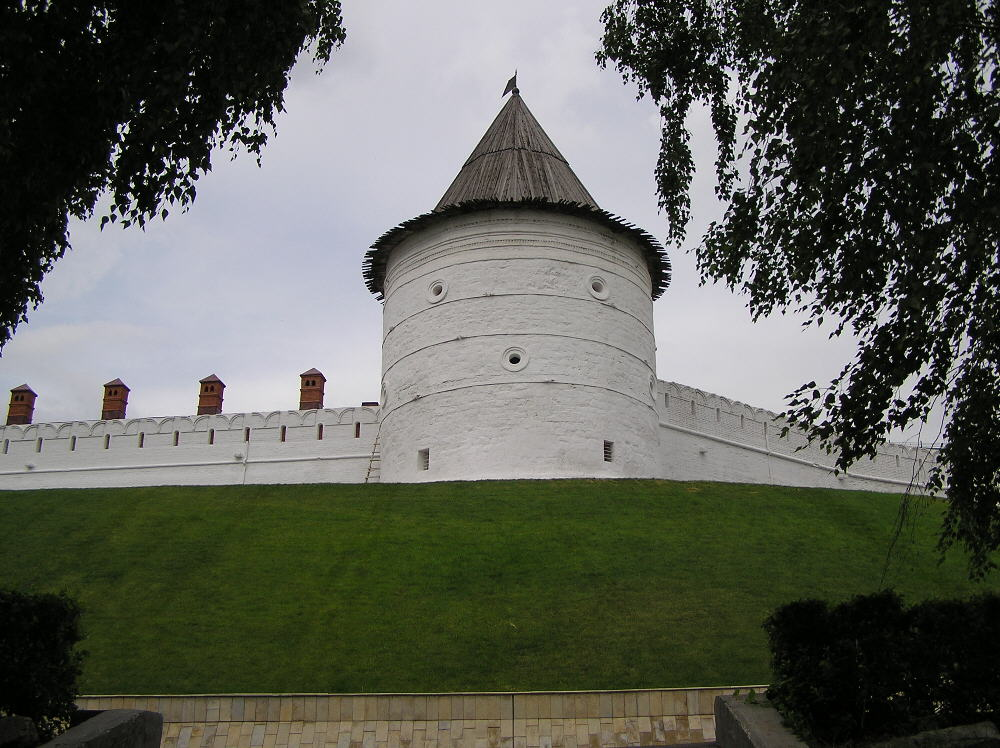
Corner tower of the Kazan kremlin.

Corner towers are fortified towers built at the corners of castles or fortresses.

== Purpose ==
Two ideas have been advanced about the purpose or value of corner towers in medieval fortresses:

- The wall corners of most medieval fortresses were weak points because they were easier to attack and more difficult to defend than the rest of the walls. Not only this, but enemy combatants that reached the tops of walls at the corners were protected at the point where the walls met, making it more difficult to repel them. Fortress corner towers were therefore constructed to make up for this vulnerability.
- These towers made possible to provide enfilade fire against attacking forces along adjacent walls. This would oblige attackers to concentrate some of their force on the corner towers themselves where they could be dealt with more effectively.

Towers constructed at fortress corners were larger and taller than other towers. At the bottom of these towers were defences, such as ditches, fences, and sometimes advanced forts or bastions.

Corner towers may be seen on the Wall of Philip II Augustus (Tour du coin (Louvre), Tour de Nesle, Tour Barbeau), on the Wall of Charles V (Tour du Bois), in the city of Carcassonne, in the Château de Pierrefonds and in the fortress of the Bastille.

== In Architecture ==
In architecture of non-defensive structures, like churches and theater buildings, a corner tower is any tower that is protruding upwards from the corner of two walls, and usually has no walls of its own below the roof. While other towers are usually attached to the building by one wall.
