= City walls of Paris =

Series of walls built around the city of Paris, France

The city limits of Paris, from the 4th century to present Gallo-Roman wall First medieval wall Wall of Philip II Augustus Wall of Charles V Wall of Louis XIII Wall of the Ferme générale Thiers wall Today

The city walls of Paris (French: enceintes de Paris or murs de Paris) refers to the city walls that surrounded Paris, as it grew from ancient times until the 20th century, built primarily to defend the city but also for administrative reasons. Several successive city walls were built over the centuries, either adding to existing walls or replacing demolished ones, through 1846, when construction of the Thiers wall was completed.

== Overview ==
The city walls of Paris include:

- a Gaulish enclosure (precise location unknown)
- a Gallo-Roman wall
- two medieval walls, one of which was the Wall of Philip II Augustus
- the Wall of Charles V, extending on the right bank of the River Seine
- the Louis XIII Wall, extending on the western part of the right bank
- the Wall of the Farmers-General, for tax purposes
- the Thiers wall.

As Paris rapidly expanded to become one of the largest cities in Europe, new walls were built to consolidate the existing city with new houses, gardens, and vegetable fields. Many historical walls were eventually destroyed (as in 1670, when Louis XIV ordered the demolition of the Louis XIII Wall), and the paths formerly occupied by the walls were often repurposed into streets or boulevards. Only a few sections of the Wall of the Farmers-General (pavilions of Claude Nicolas Ledoux) and the Wall of Philippe Auguste survive to the present day. The walls' influence on modern Paris can still be seen on some of its major streets and boulevards, such as:

- the Grands boulevards (main streets), built by replacing the Charles V and Louis XIII Walls
- the parallel streets Rue de Cléry and Rue d'Aboukir (2nd Arrondissement), tracing the route of the Charles V Wall
- the outer boulevards, built in place of the Wall of the Farmers-General
- the Boulevards of the Marshals, a loop encircling the city consisting of boulevards named for the Marshals of France, built to replace the Thiers wall
- the Boulevard Périphérique (ring road or beltway), built beyond the loop of the Boulevards of the Marshals.

== Gaulish enclosure ==
Prior to the Roman occupation of Gaul, the settlement that eventually became the city of Paris was known to the Romans as Lutetia and inhabited by the Parisii tribe. The town lacked proper defenses and was therefore partially demolished at the beginning of the Roman occupation. The first wall of Paris was probably built by the Gauls on the River Seine, although its exact location is unknown. In his Commentaries on the Gallic War, Julius Caesar wrote: "Id est oppidum Parisiorum, quod positum est in insula fluminis Sequanae" ("This is a town of the Parisii, situated on an island on the river of the Seine"), indicating that Lutetia was a fortified camp on an island. The relationship between this island and the Île de la Cité has not been demonstrated, and excavations have not uncovered anything predating the reign of Augustus, the first Roman Emperor. Adding to the uncertainty is the 2003 discovery of the remains of a city on a site now occupied by Nanterre.

== Gallo-Roman wall ==
Lutetia developed on the left bank of the Seine during Roman times, and to a lesser extent on the Île de la Cité. The right bank was largely uninhabitable due to marshes. During the first barbarian invasions in AD 285, the people of Lutetia abandoned the left bank, taking refuge on the Île de la Cité and destroying the bridges. The eastern half of the island was protected by a wall, constructed of rocks collected from the Arènes de Lutèce.

== First medieval wall ==
Traces of an enclosure at the corner of the rue de l'Arbre-Sec and the rue de Rivoli were discovered in 2009 during excavations made by National Institute for Preventive Archaeological Research (INRAP), the French National Institute for Preventive Archaeological Research. This confirmed the probable existence of an enclosure around the centre of Paris on the right bank around the 10th century. This wall was most likely built as a result of a Viking siege in 885 and was constructed by either Odo of France or Robert I of France. The fortification wall consisted of a ditch 3-metre (9.8 ft) deep and 12-metre (39 ft) wide coupled with a raised bank likely topped by a timber pallisade.

== Wall of Philip Augustus ==
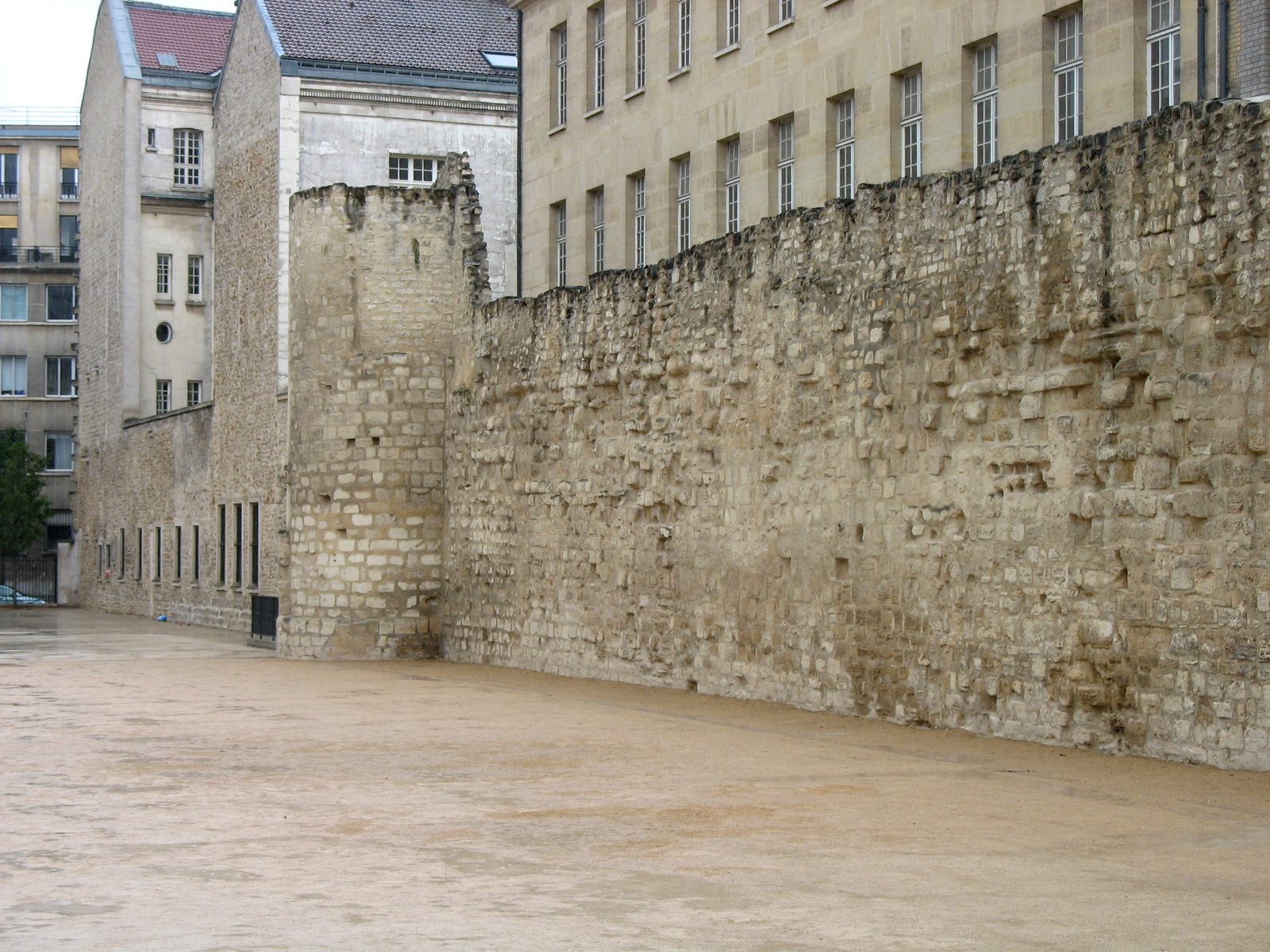
The Wall of Philippe Auguste

Paris grew very quickly during the early Middle Ages and soon extended from the Montagne Sainte-Geneviève to the roads leading to the abbey of Saint-Denis. A new wall was begun in 1190 on the order and funding of King Philip II of France (also known as Philip Augustus) and was completed by 1213, enclosing 253 hectares on both sides of the Seine. This new wall was 8 feet (2.4 m) thick in some places, protected by wide and deep ditches, and was fortified with as many as five hundred towers.

The Wall of Philippe Auguste ran from the current location of the Pont des Arts, approached the porte Saint-Honoré, opened at the porte Coquillière, reached the porte Saint-Denis, porte Mauconseil, porte Babette, came to rue Vielle-du-Temple, the rue des Francs-Bourgeois, to the porte Baudoyer and the quai des Célestins. On the south side, the wall picked up at the Palais de la Tournelle, opened at the porte Saint-Victor, porte Bordet, porte Saint-Jacques, Porte Saint-Michel, porte des Corderliers, near the cour de la Commerce, the porte de Buci, and ended at the Tour de Nesle. Many elements of the wall's structure were later incorporated into private buildings or into the subsequent Wall of Charles V.

== Wall of Charles V ==
The Wall of Charles V was built from 1356 to 1383, during the reign of Charles V and his son and successor Charles VI. The area enclosed on the left bank remained the same as with the Wall of Philippe Auguste, but the area enclosed on the right bank increased to include the mansions of the Marais and the Templar enclosure. The new city limits totaled 439 hectares across the two banks. During the construction of the Wall of Louis XIII, the Wall of Charles V was partly incorporated into the new wall and partly destroyed.

== Louis XIII Wall ==
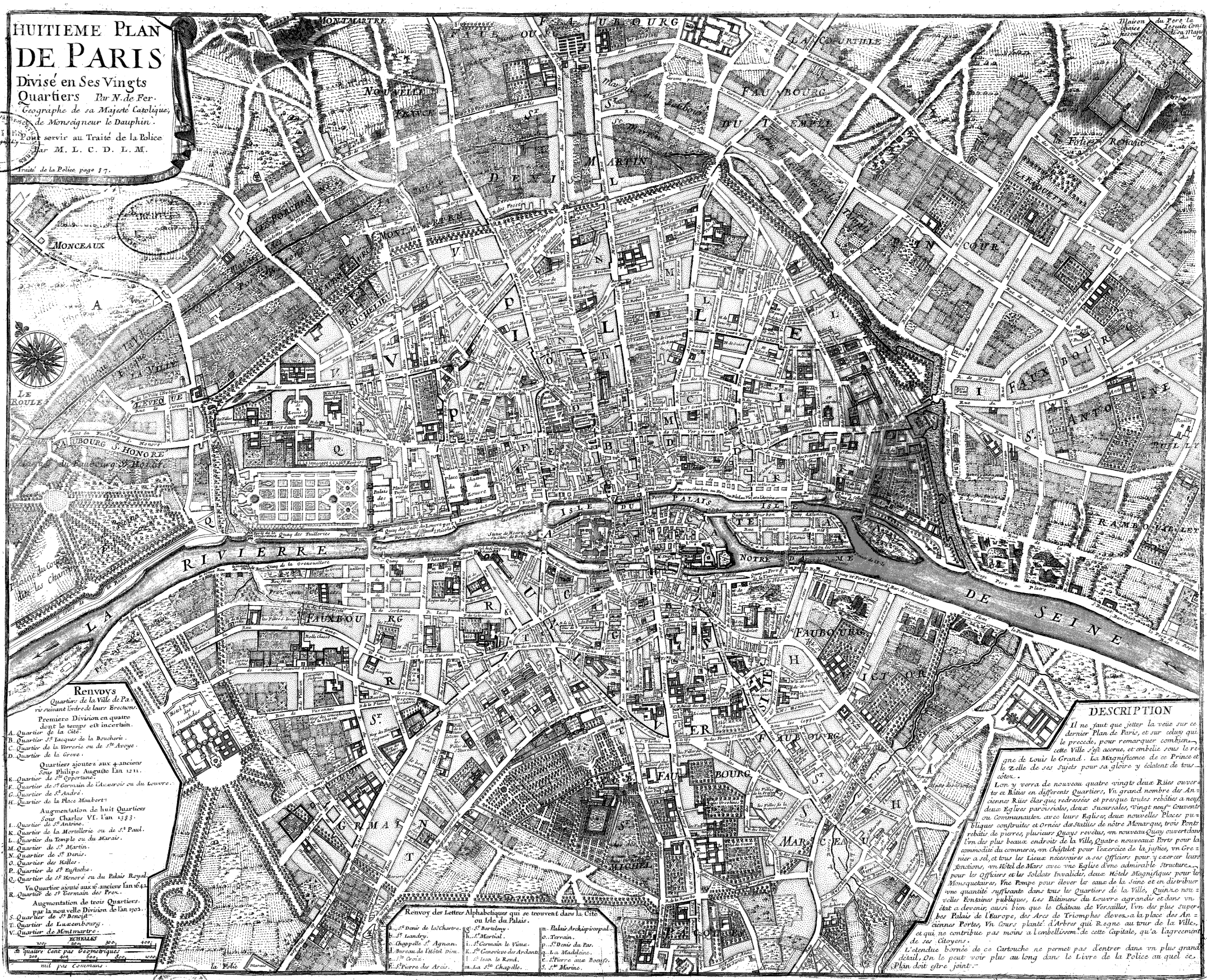
Map of Paris in 1705 with the first boulevards and the remaining part of the Louis XIII Wall

The Louis XIII Wall, also known as the "yellow ditches wall", was designed by Jacques Lemercier and built between 1633 and 1636. It enlarged the Wall of Charles V over the western part of the right bank (now the First and Second Arrondissements).

From 1670 onward, Louis XIV believed that Paris had been made a secure city as a result of his conquests, and he therefore ordered the wall destroyed. Its route was later replaced with the grands boulevards.

== Wall of the Farmers-General ==
The Wall of the Farmers-General was built in the years between 1784 and 1791 under the direction of Claude Nicolas Ledoux and at the request of the Ferme Générale. It enclosed 3,402 hectares, including the village of Austerlitz, which was incorporated into Paris in 1818. Unlike previous walls, the goal of this wall was not to defend Paris, but to collect taxes and fees on behalf of the government which caused much resentment from the public. It was destroyed when the city limits were extended to the Thiers wall in 1860.

This wall was later replaced by a second belt of boulevards: Charonne, Ménilmontant, Belleville, La Villette, La Chapelle, Clichy, Batignolles, Courcelles, avenue de Wagram and Iena, streets Benjamin Franklin and Alboni, boulevard de Grenelle, Garibaldi, Pasteur, Montparnasse, Edgar Quinet, Raspail, Saint-Jacques, Auguste-Blanqui, Vincent Auriol, Bercy, and Picpus.

== Thiers Wall ==
The Thiers wall was constructed from 1841 to 1846 after being proposed by prime minister and future President of France Adolphe Thiers. It enclosed 7,802 hectares along the present-day Boulevards des Maréchaux and a glacis extending to the location of today's Boulevard Périphérique. It was demolished between 1919 and 1929.

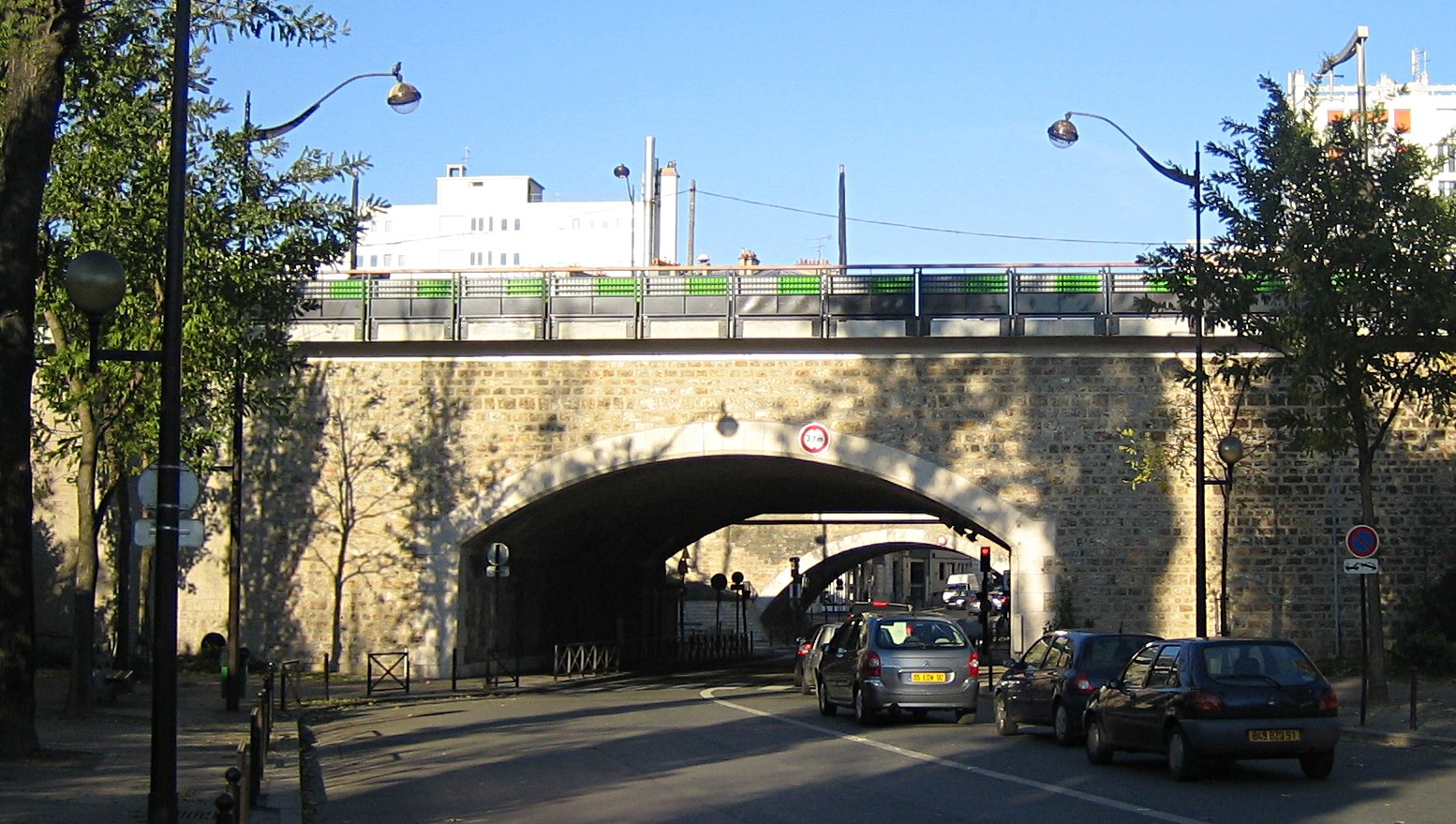
The poterne des Peupliers, the only remaining trace of the Thiers wall

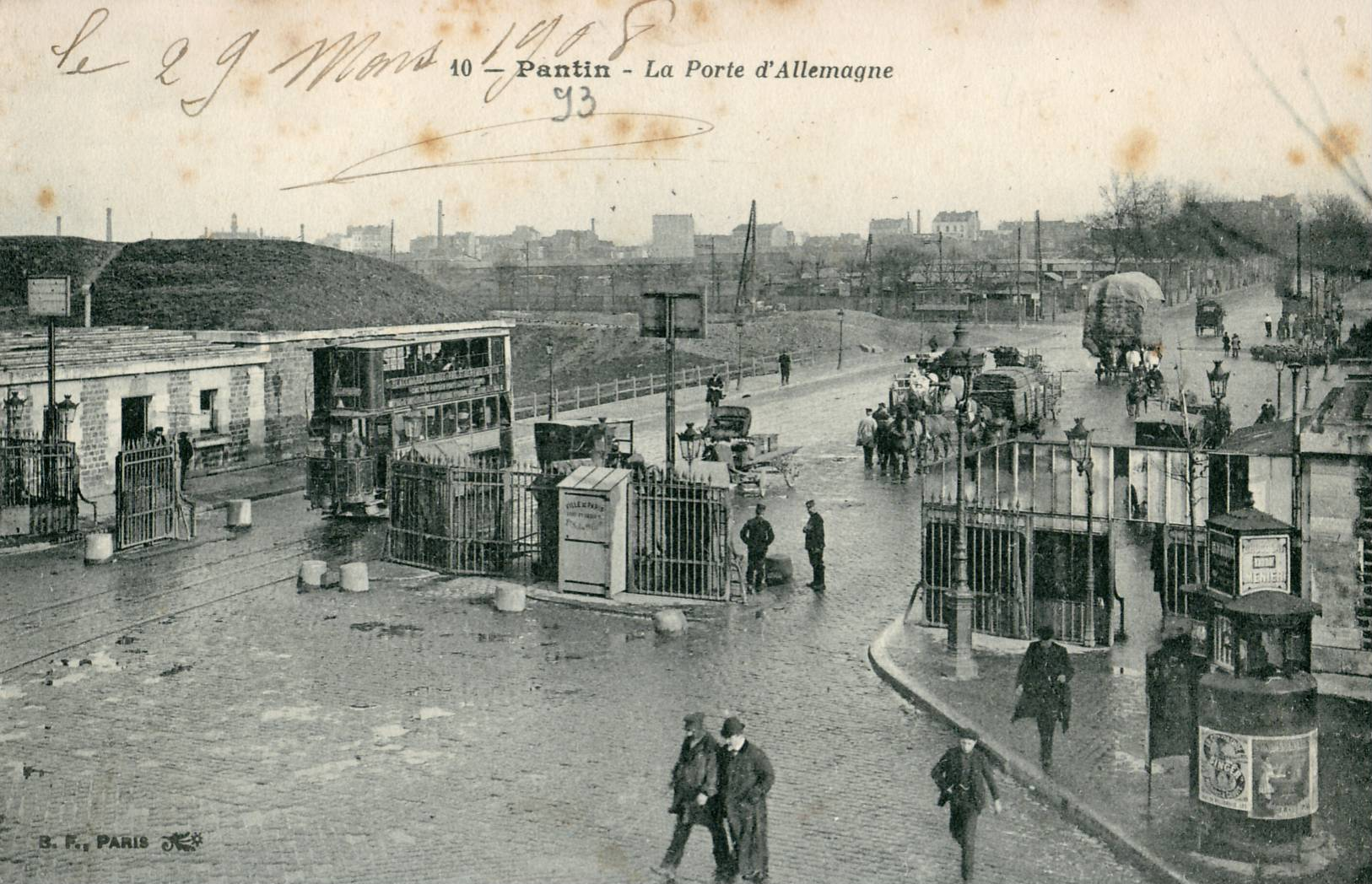
The porte de Pantin about 1908

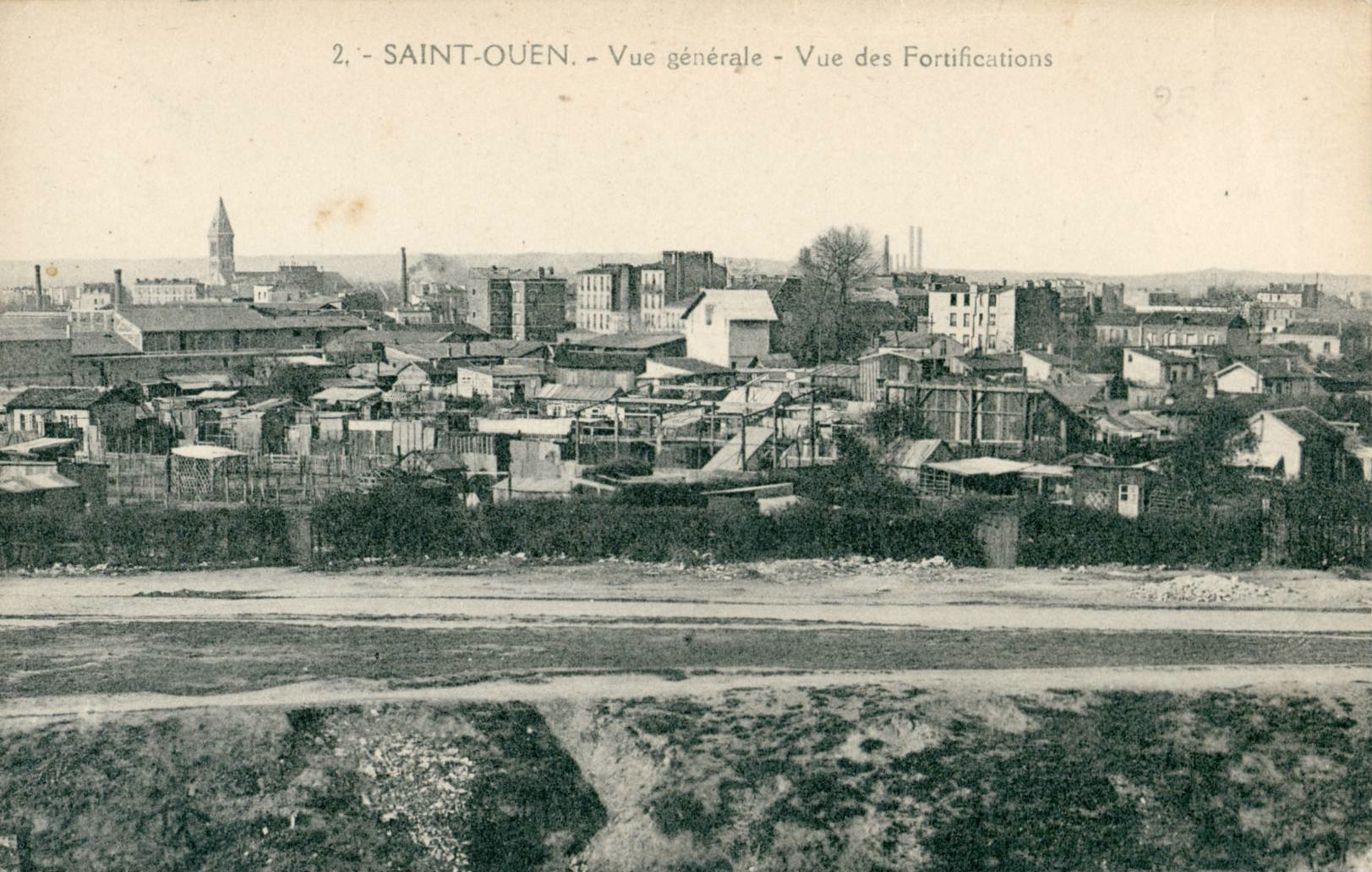
The fortifs zone, in Saint-Ouen

== See also ==
- City gates of Paris
- Fortifications of Paris in the 19th and 20th centuries

== Bibliography ==
- Renaud Gagneux et Denis Prouvost, Sur les traces des enceintes de Paris, Parigramme, 2004.
- Jacques Hillairet, Dictionnaire historique des rues de Paris.
- Guy le Hallé, Histoire des fortifications de Paris et leur extension en Île-de-France, Éditions Horvath, 1995.
- Guy le Hallé, in « Paris aux cent villages », mensuel (mai 1975–janvier 1982) :
