= Hôtel de Nevers (left bank) =

Hôtel de Nevers; Hôtel de Guénégaud; Hôtel de Conti
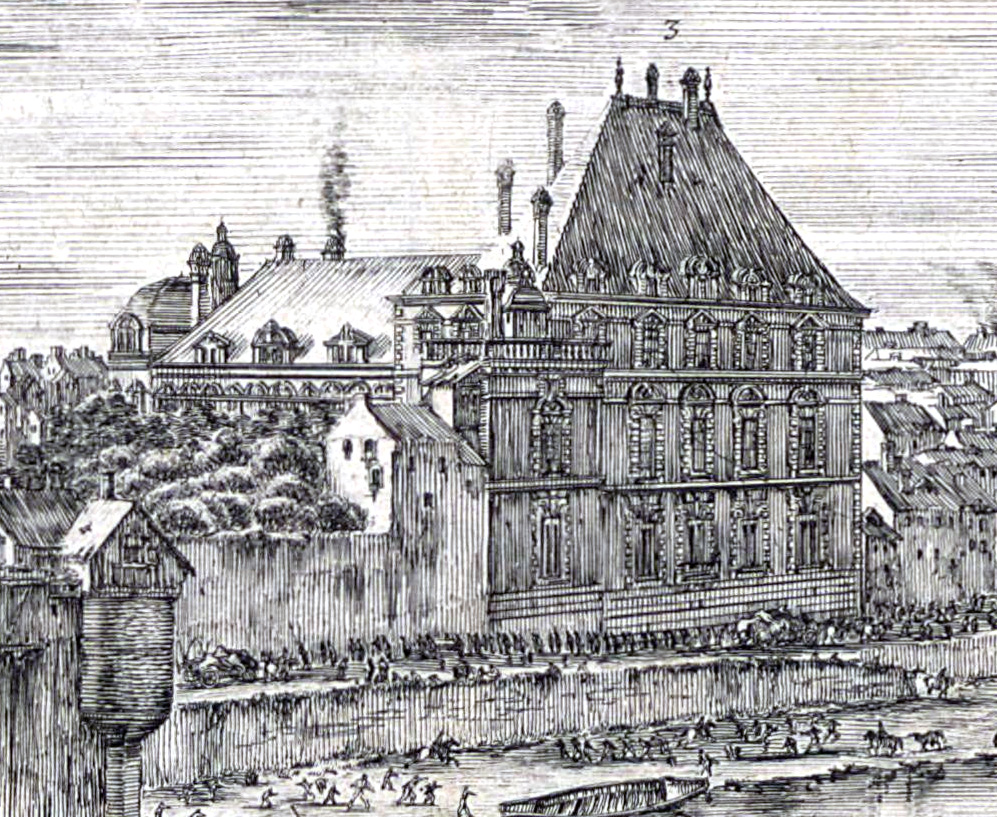
- River façade of the north pavilion as seen in 1646 from the middle of the Pont Neuf (detail from an engraving by Stefano della Bella)
- Interactive map of the: Hôtel de Nevers; Hôtel de Guénégaud; Hôtel de Conti; area

General information
- Type: Hôtel particulier
- Location: quai de Conti, Paris, France
- Coordinates: 48°51′24″N 2°20′20″E
- Construction started: c. 1580
- Demolished: 1768–1771

Design and construction
- Architect: Unknown (1580); François Mansart (1648)

The Hôtel de Nevers (French pronunciation: [otɛl də nəvɛʁ]), later the Hôtel de Guénégaud ([- ɡeneɡo]), then the Hôtel de Conti, was a French aristocratic townhouse (hôtel particulier), which was located on the Quai de Nevers (now the Quai de Conti), just east of the former Tour de Nesle on the site of the present day Hôtel des Monnaies in the 6th arrondissement of Paris. Construction began in 1580 to the designs of an unknown architect for Louis Gonzaga, Duke of Nevers, although it was never completed as intended. The large north pavilion on the River Seine was a prominent landmark of its part of the Left Bank. The hôtel was demolished sometime between 1768 and 1771.

== Hôtel de Nevers ==
In 1572 Louis Gonzaga, Duke of Nevers, purchased from the French king, Charles IX, the Grand Nesle, an old townhouse located just east of the Tour de Nesle on the Left Bank of Paris. Nevers had it reconstructed around 1580, after which it became known as the Hôtel de Nevers. Although never completed, the new hôtel was greatly admired by contemporaries. Nevers' secretary, Blaise de Vigenère, a distinguished antiquarian and art historian, wrote that the house had a vault, built by Italian workmen, which was more grand than the one at the Baths of Caracalla. Although De Vigenère likely overstated the size, it must have been very impressive and was an architectural feature that was new to Paris.

The Hôtel de Nevers was a prominent early example in Paris of the brick-and-stone style developed in the Île-de-France in the middle of the 16th century. The large terminal pavilion on the river was similar in proportions to the Louvre's Pavillon du Roi, readily visible, since it was almost directly north on the other side of the river. Although there is no documentation identifying the architect with certainty, the architectural historian David Thomson suggested Pierre Lescot or more likely Baptiste Androuet du Cerceau. Jean-Pierre Babelon agreed that Baptiste Androuet du Cerceau was probable, or possibly Thibaut Métezeau.

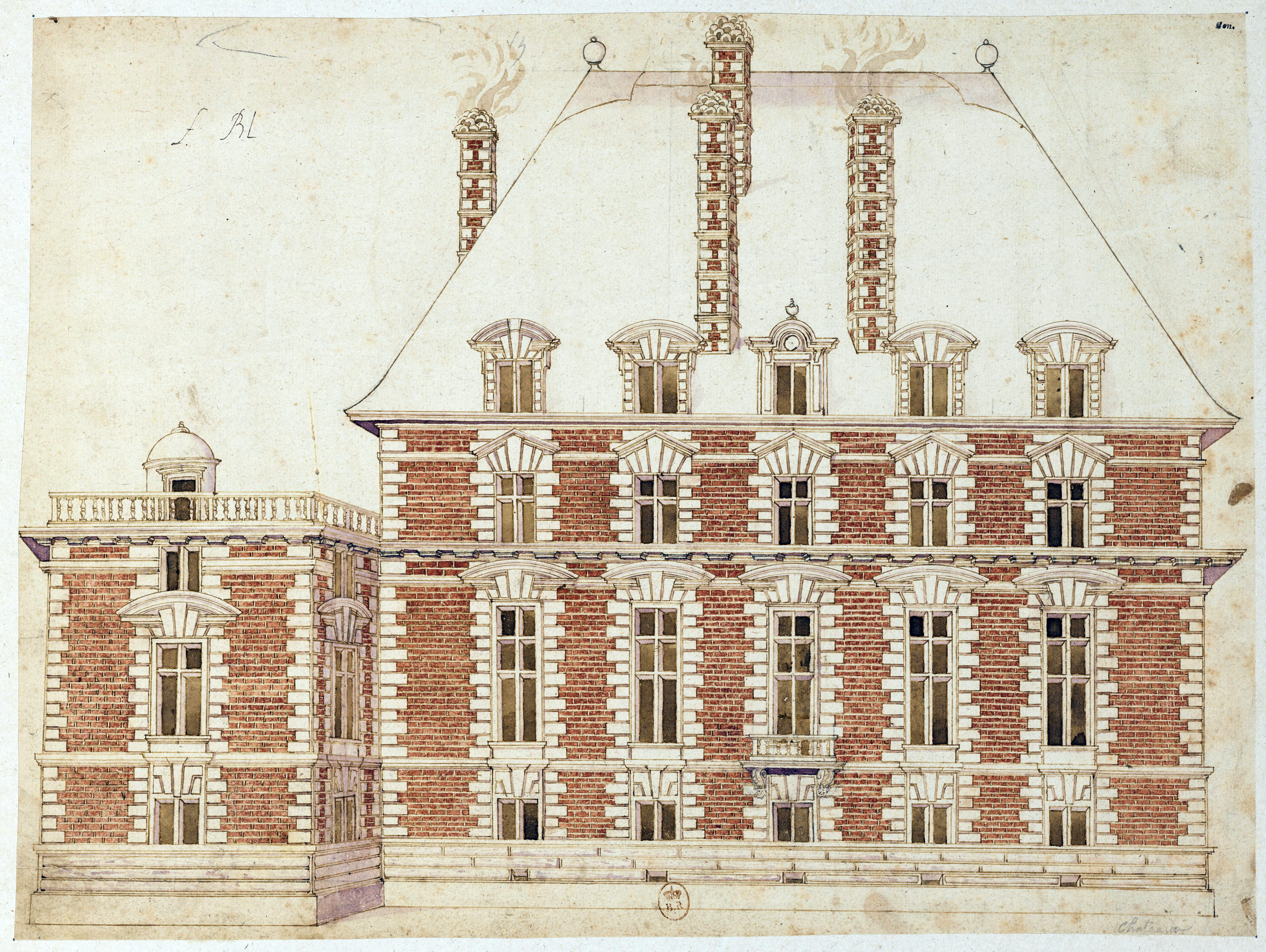
River façade in brick and stone (undated)

The corps de logis was laid out perpendicular to the river with its entrance to the west and a garden to the east. Because of problems acquiring land to the south (where the city wall of Philippe Auguste still stood), only the north terminal pavilion, the central pavilion and the wing connecting them were constructed. This is evident in a 1648 (or earlier) drawing by Israel Silvestre with a view from the west and a 1637 painting by Abraham de Verwer. Near the beginning of the 17th century, Claude Chastillon drew a view from the east, projecting how the completed hôtel would have looked.

Early 17th-century views of the Hôtel de Nevers

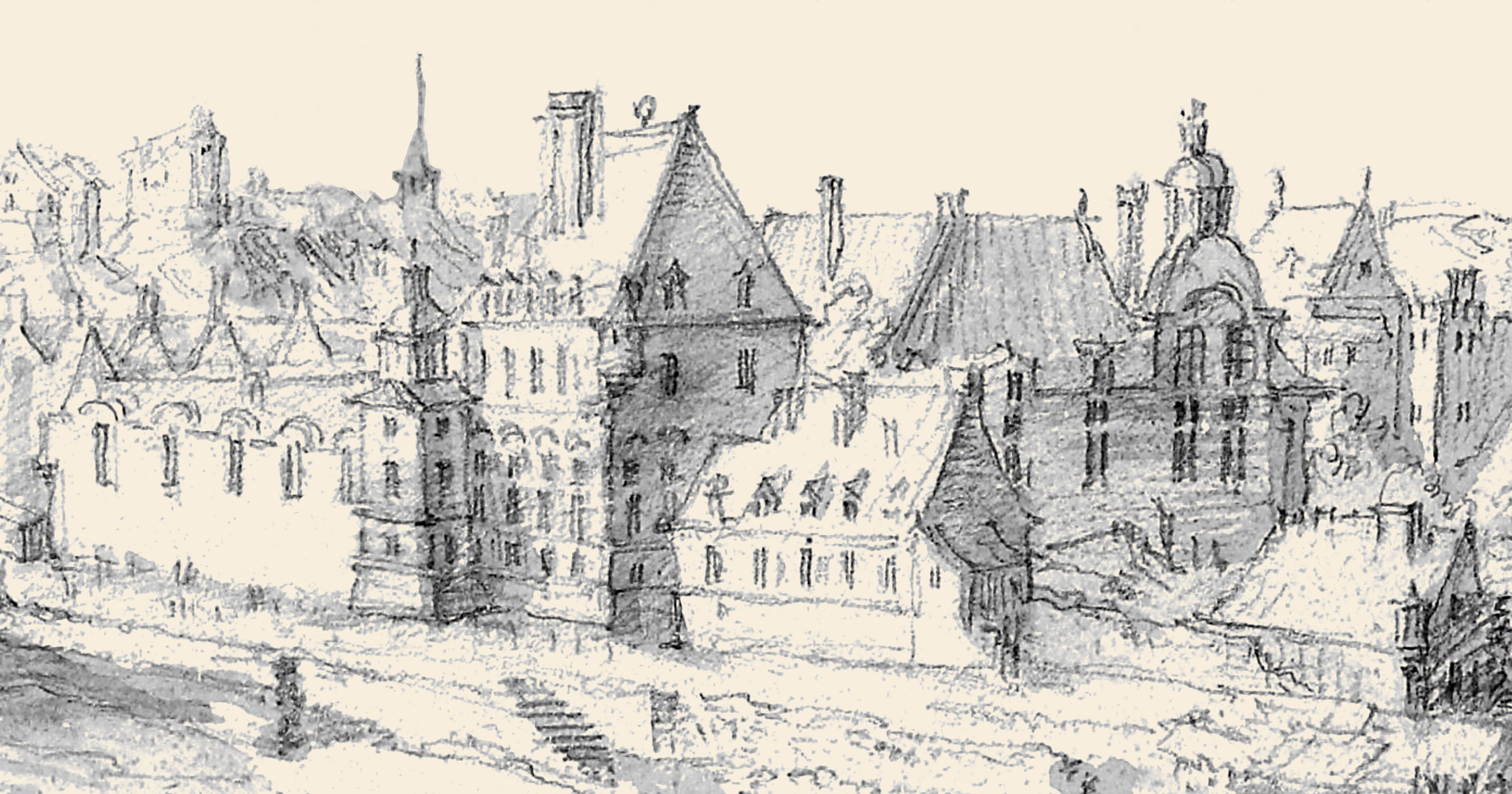
The Hôtel de Nevers in 1620 (detail from a view of Paris by architect Étienne Martellange)

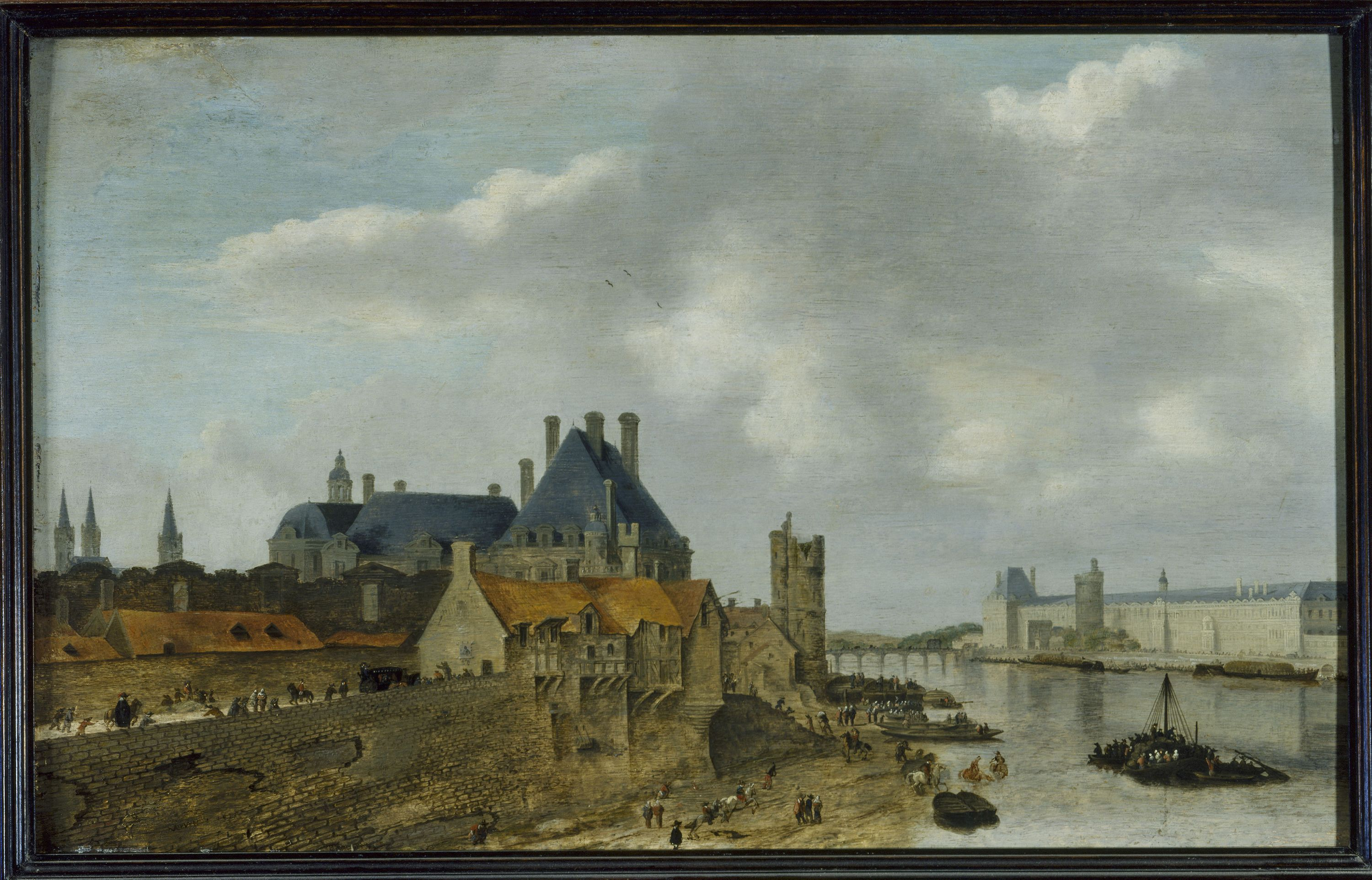
The Hôtel de Nevers as painted in 1637 by Abraham de Verwer

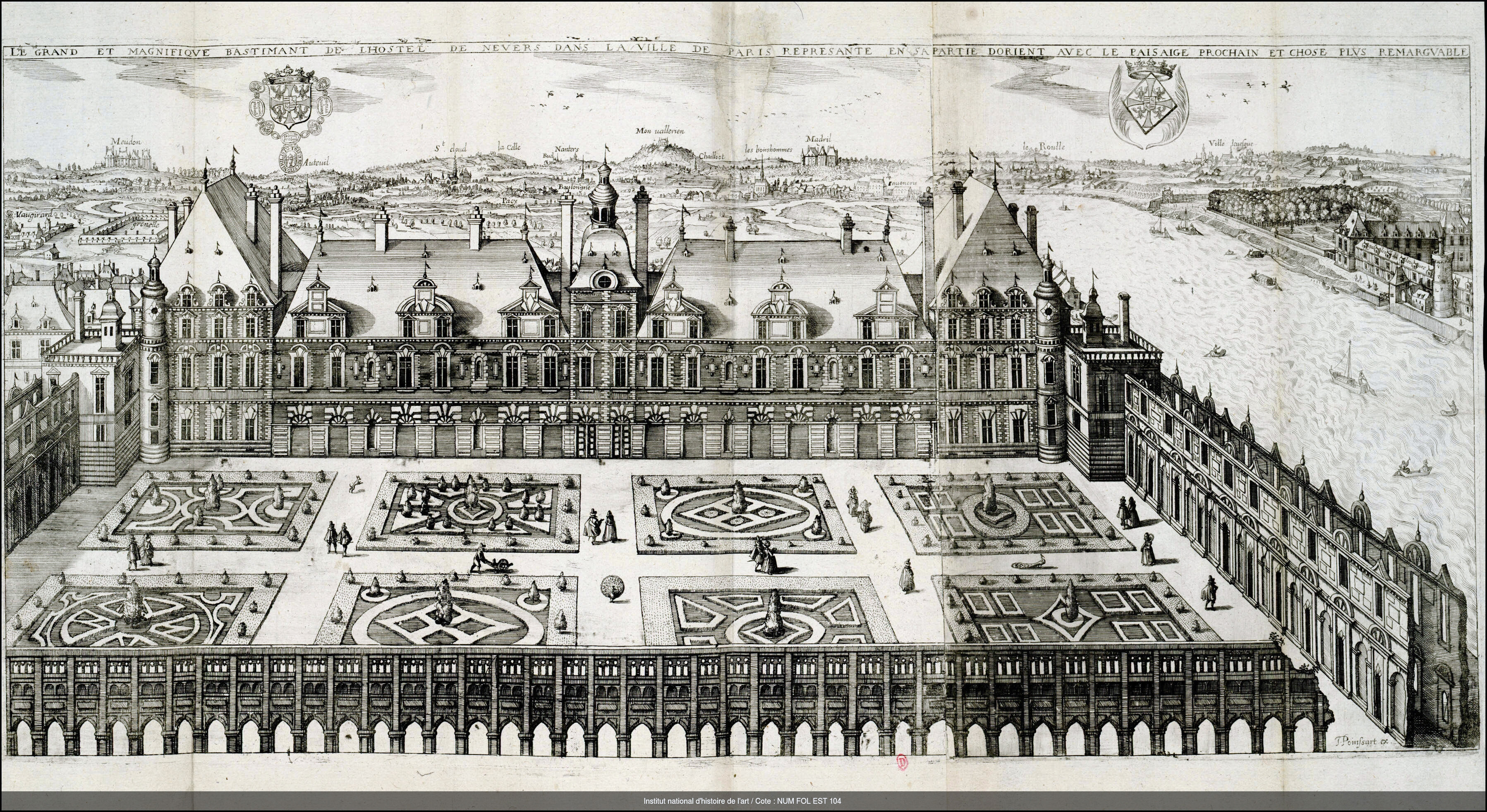
View of the garden side of the Hôtel de Nevers as projected by Claude Chastillon c. 1600, engraved by Jacques Poinssart
Views of the Hôtel de Nevers by Israël Silvestre

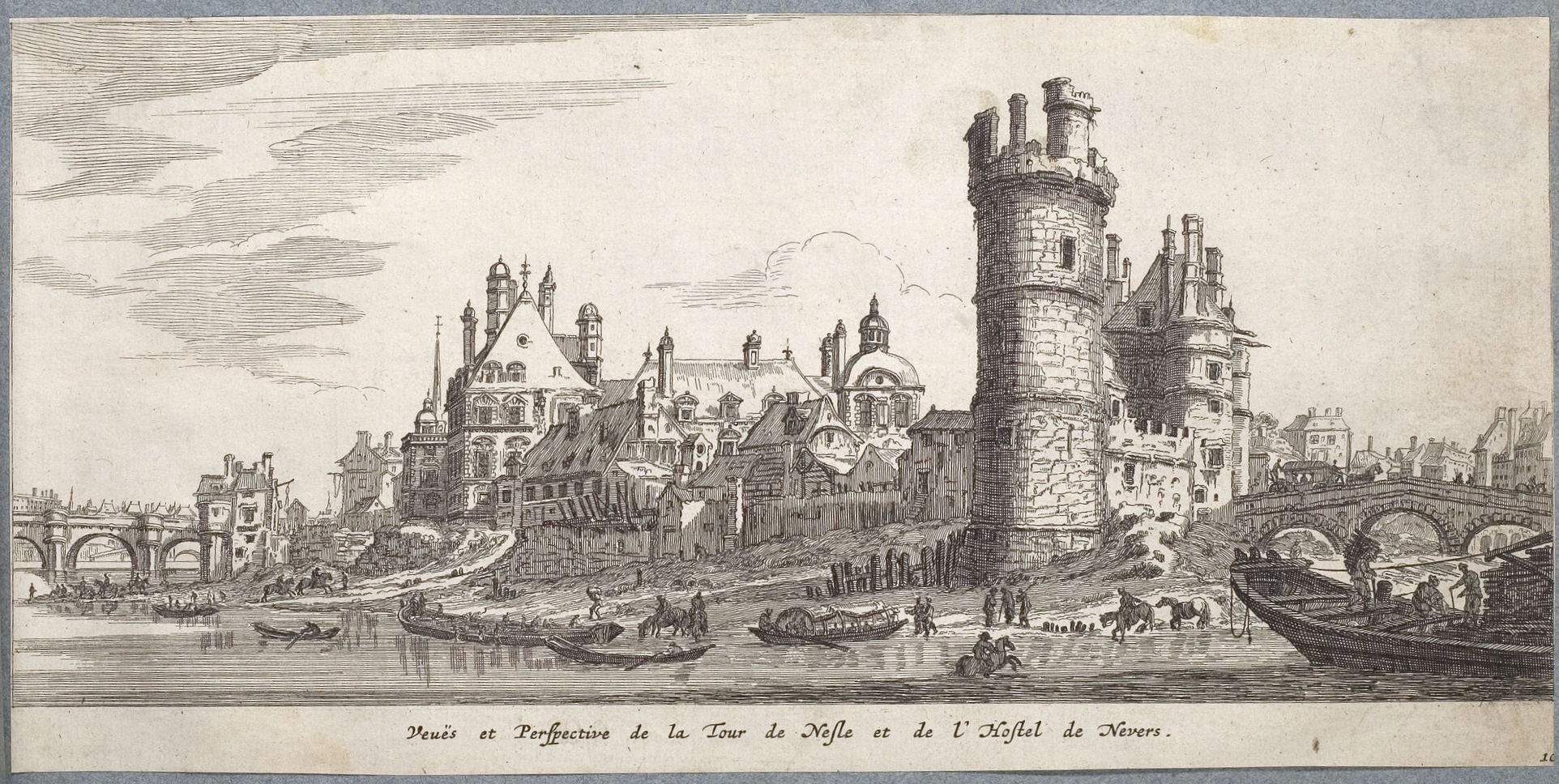
View of the Tour de Nesle and the Hôtel de Nevers about 1648 or earlier, as drawn by Silvestre and engraved by Goyrand

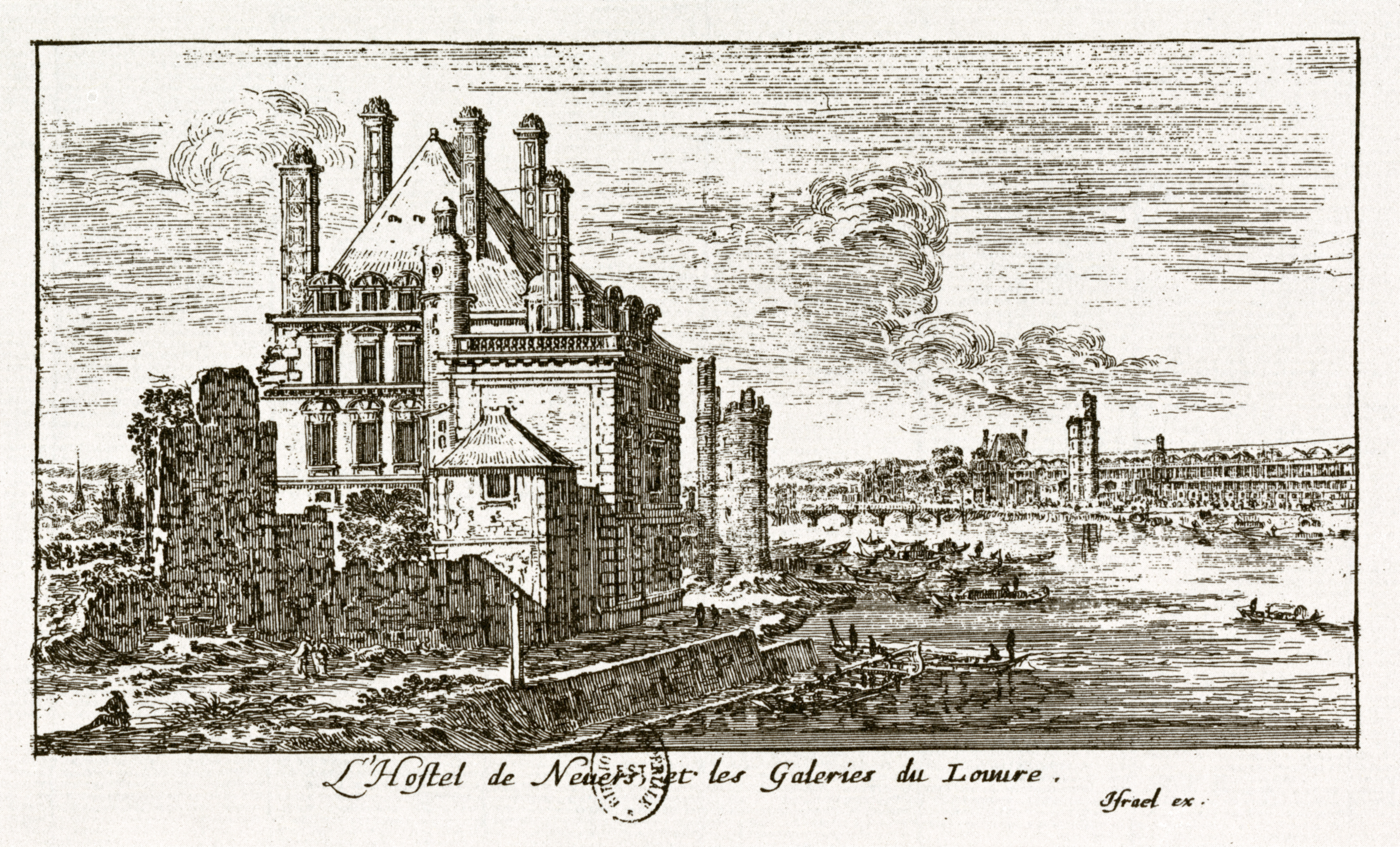
View of the grand pavilion from the east (1652)

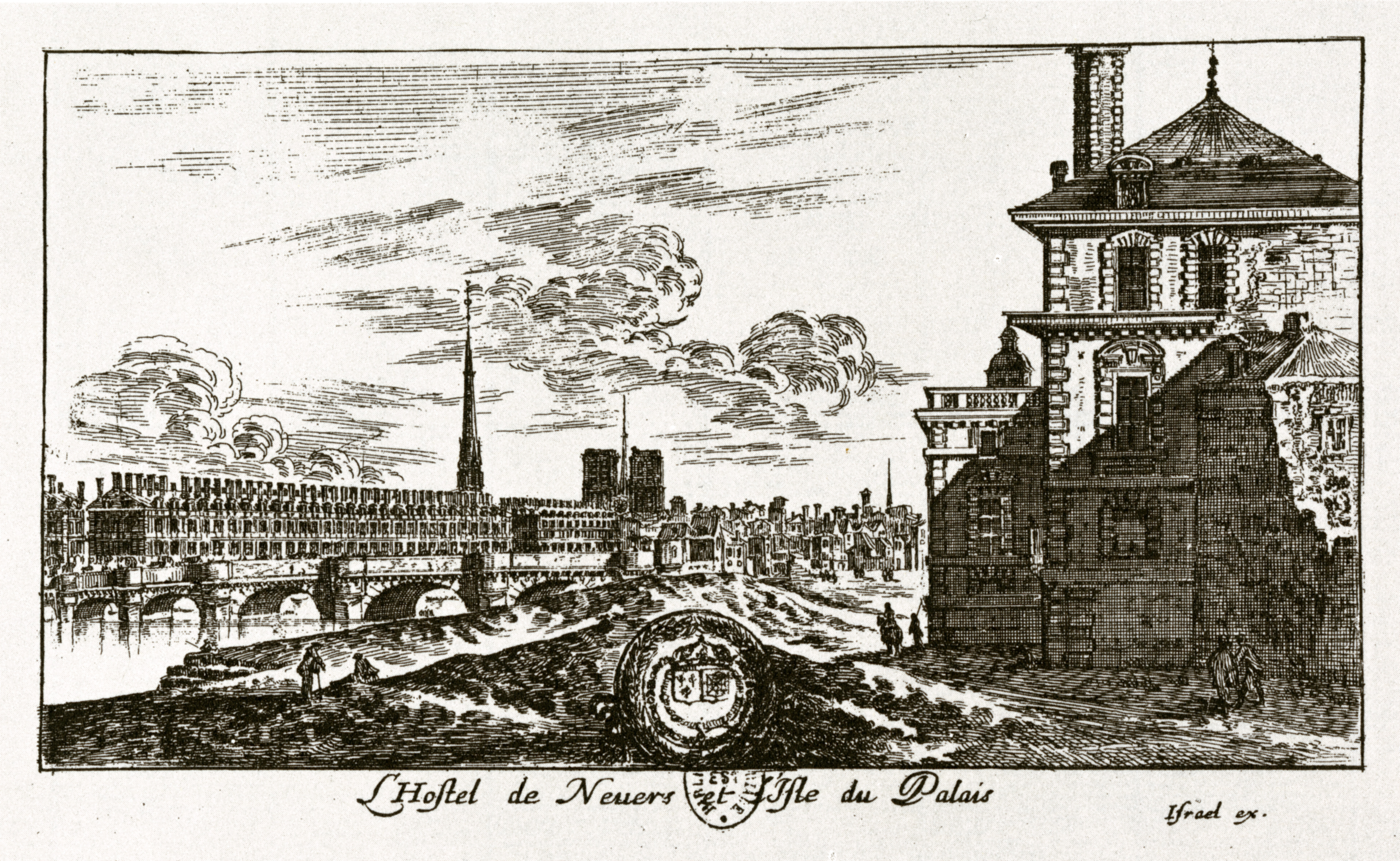
View of the grand pavilion from the west (1652)

== Hôtel de Guénégaud ==
The Hôtel de Nevers was purchased in 1646 by Henri de Guénégaud, who in 1643, during the regency of Anne of Austria under her first minister, Cardinal Mazarin, had become Secretary of State of the Navy, as well as Secretary of State of several regions of France (including Paris), the Maison du Roi, and ecclesiastical affairs. Guénégaud had the architect François Mansart remodel the Hôtel de Nevers in 1648–1652, and it became the Hôtel de Guénégaud. The rue Guénégaud was created on the garden side of the hôtel.

Mansart added additional wings on the entrance side, creating an entrance courtyard and a service courtyard to its south. His changes are clearly shown on the 1652 Gomboust map of Paris. The entrance façade, with a striking, rusticated porte-cochère, which was engraved by Jean Marot, became a prominent landmark on the Left Bank.

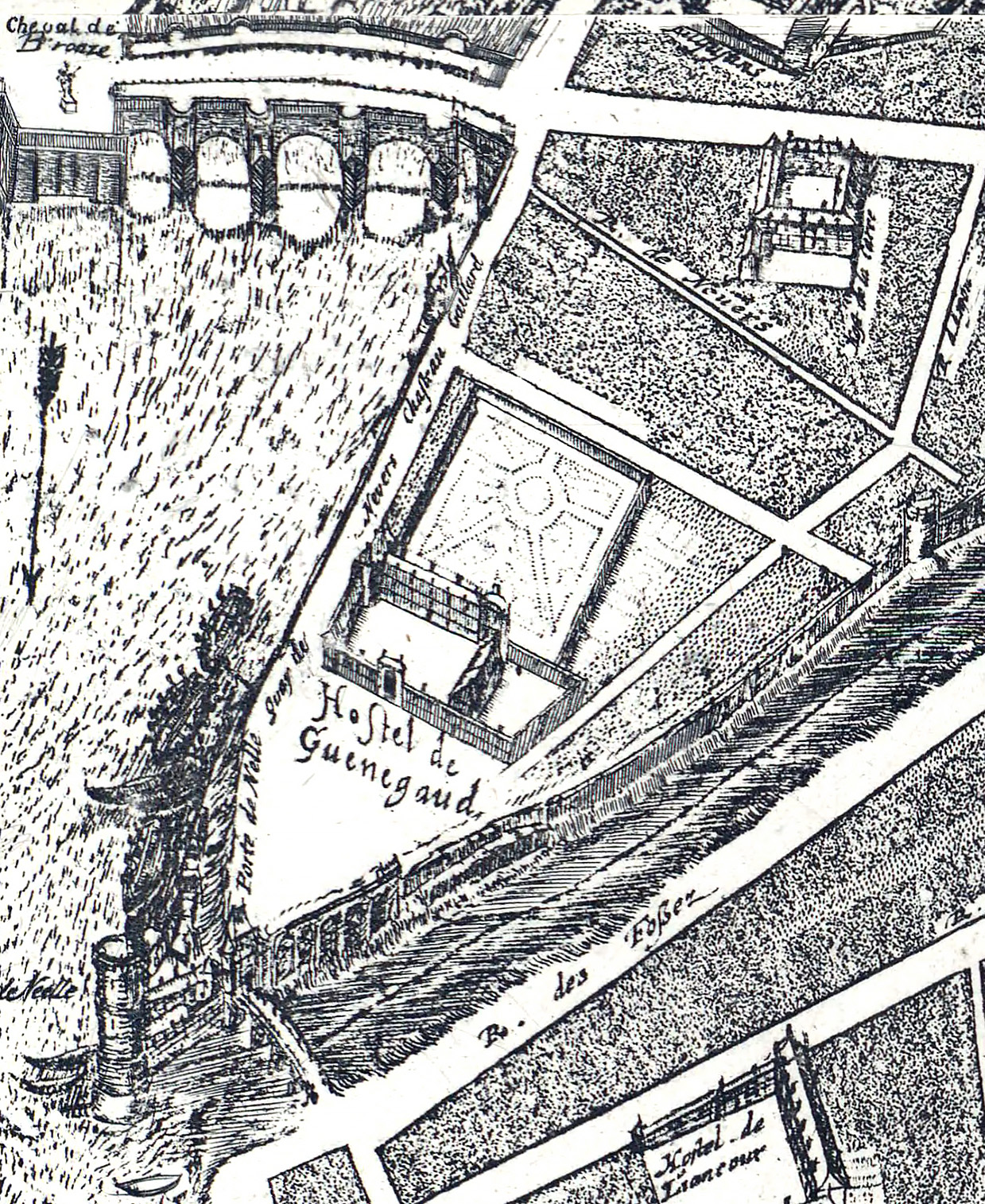
Hôtel de Guénégaud on the 1652 Gomboust map of Paris, showing the new entrance courtyard and the smaller service courtyard to its right

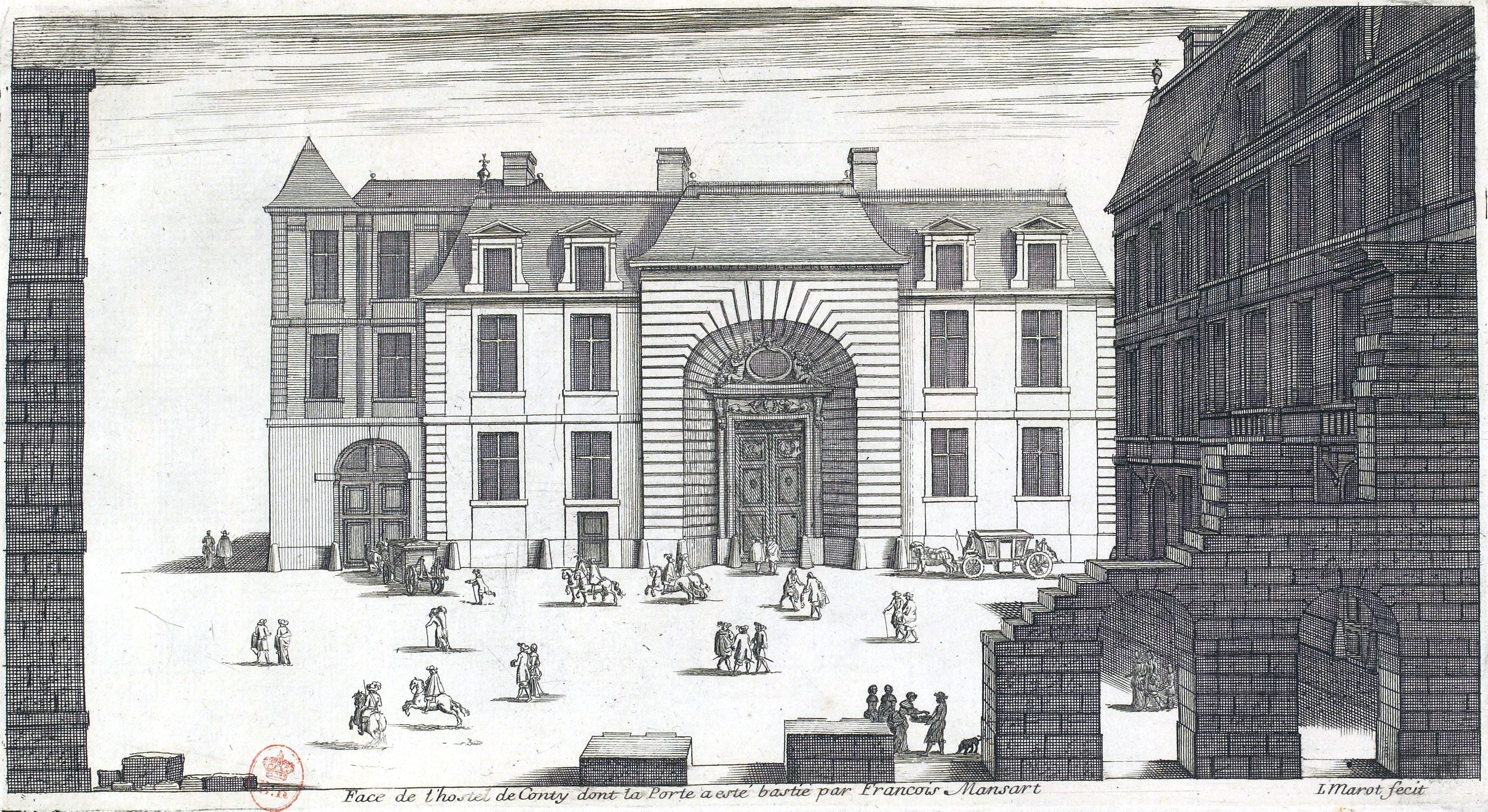
Entrance wing with the rusticated porte-cochère, designed c. 1648–1650 by the architect François Mansart and later engraved by Jean Marot
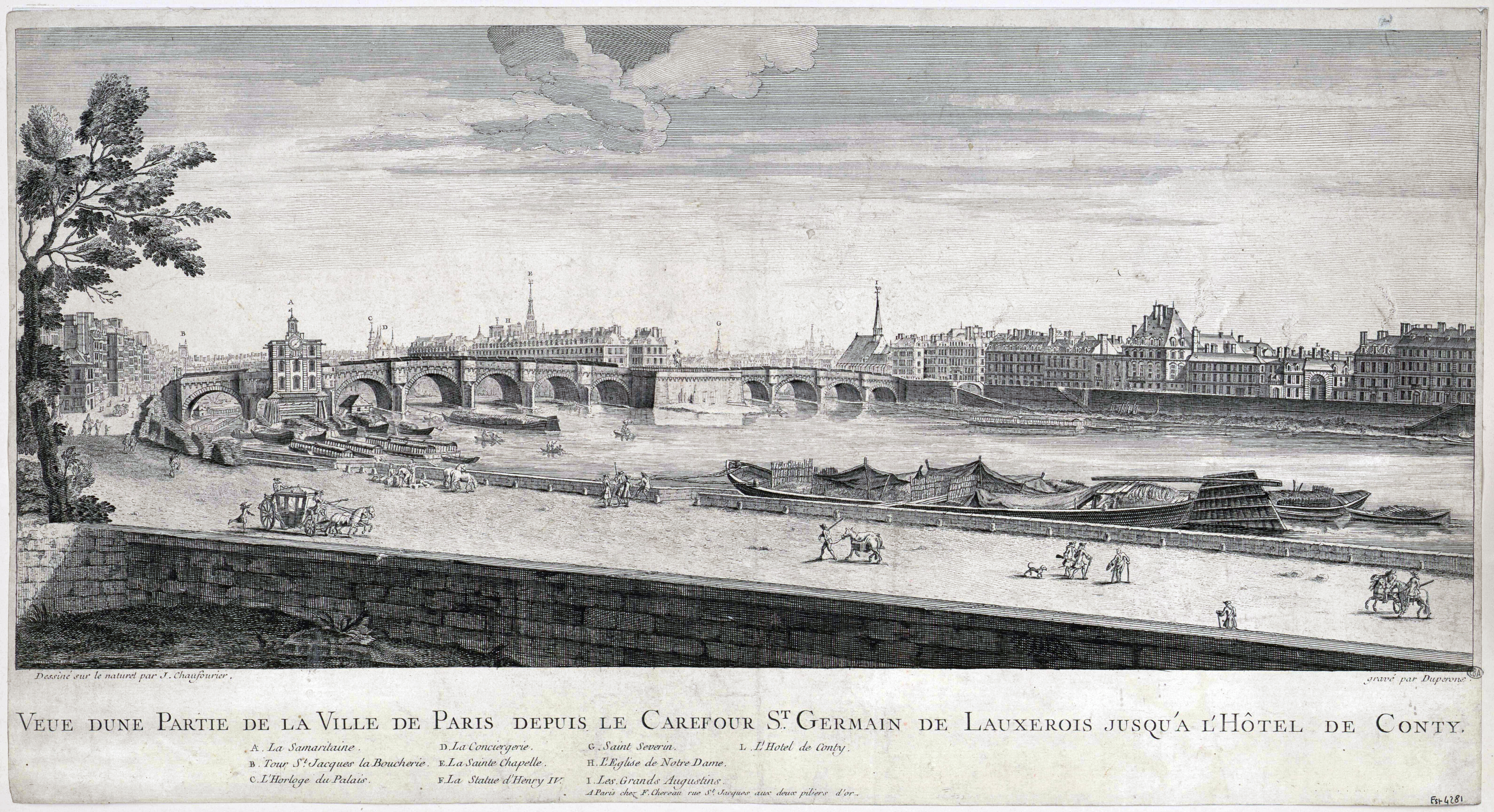
Mansart's large porte-cochère, visible on the right in an 18th-century panoramic view of the Left Bank

== Hôtel de Conti ==
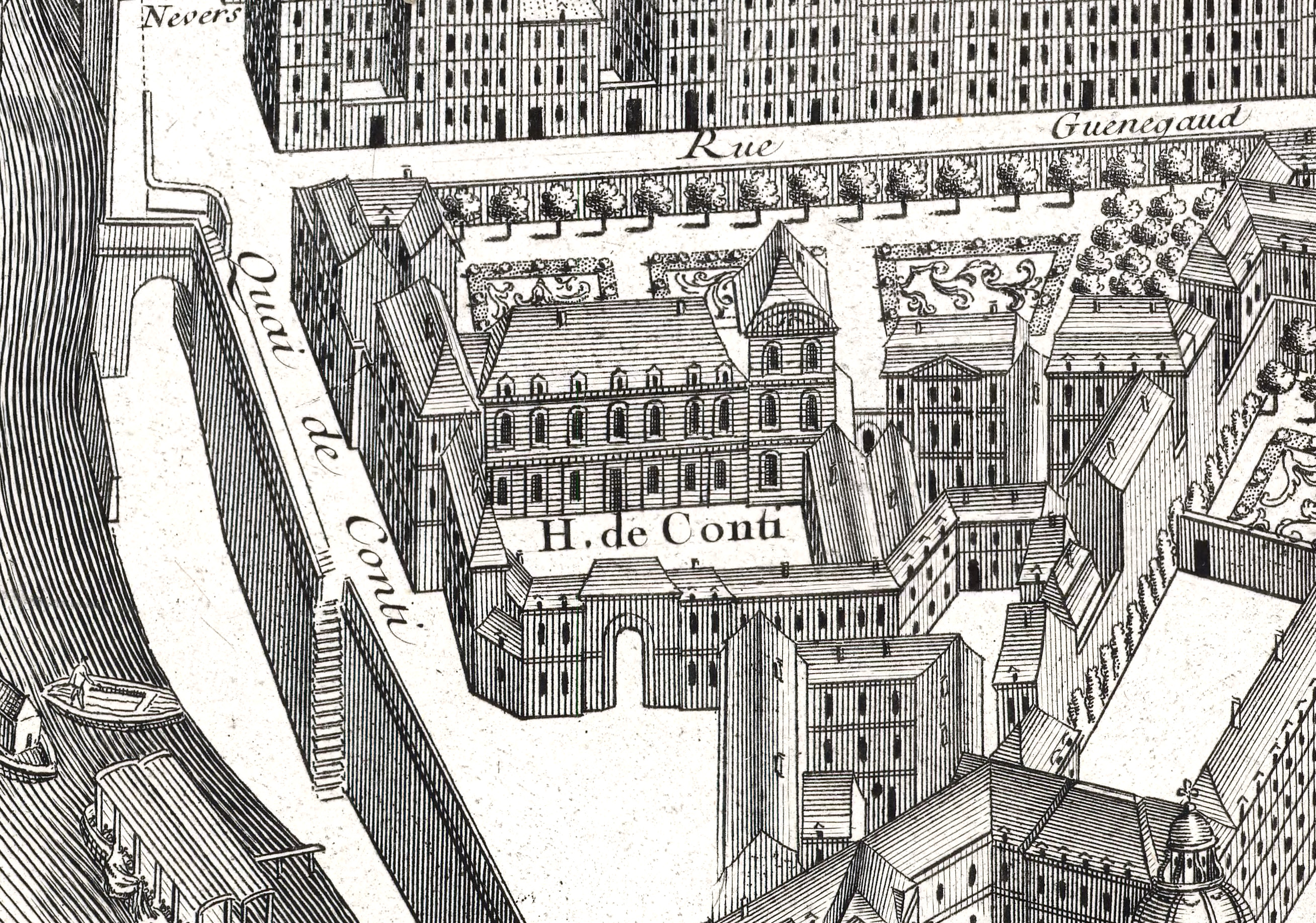
The Hôtel de Conti on the Quai de Conti on the 1739 Turgot map of Paris

In 1669, Henri de Guénégaud fell from favor and was replaced as Secretary of State by Jean-Baptiste Colbert. In 1670 Anne-Marie Martinozzi, Princesse de Conti, who was a niece of Cardinal Mazarin, exchanged her house on the Quai Malaquais, as well as her beautiful country house in Bouchet, for the Hôtel de Guénégaud. After the exchange, her old house on the Quai Malaquais became the Hôtel du Plessis-Guénégaud, and her new house became the Hôtel de Conti. The Quai de Nevers was renamed Quai de Conti.

After Anne-Marie's death in 1672, the Hôtel de Conti on the Quai de Conti passed to her son Louis Armand, who had become the Prince of Conti after his father's death in 1666. When Louis Armand died in 1685, he had no descendants, so the title and the house passed to his brother François-Louis de Bourbon. The latter's son, Louis Armand II de Bourbon, inherited the title and the house after his father died in 1709, and after his death in 1727, both were inherited by his son, Louis François de Bourbon. The latter sold it along with adjacent property in 1749 to form the site of a proposed new Hôtel de Ville, a project that was later abandoned. It was used as a garde-meuble (a place for the storage of furniture) for the king until 1768, when authorization was given to build the new Monnaie, for which the first stone was laid in 1771.

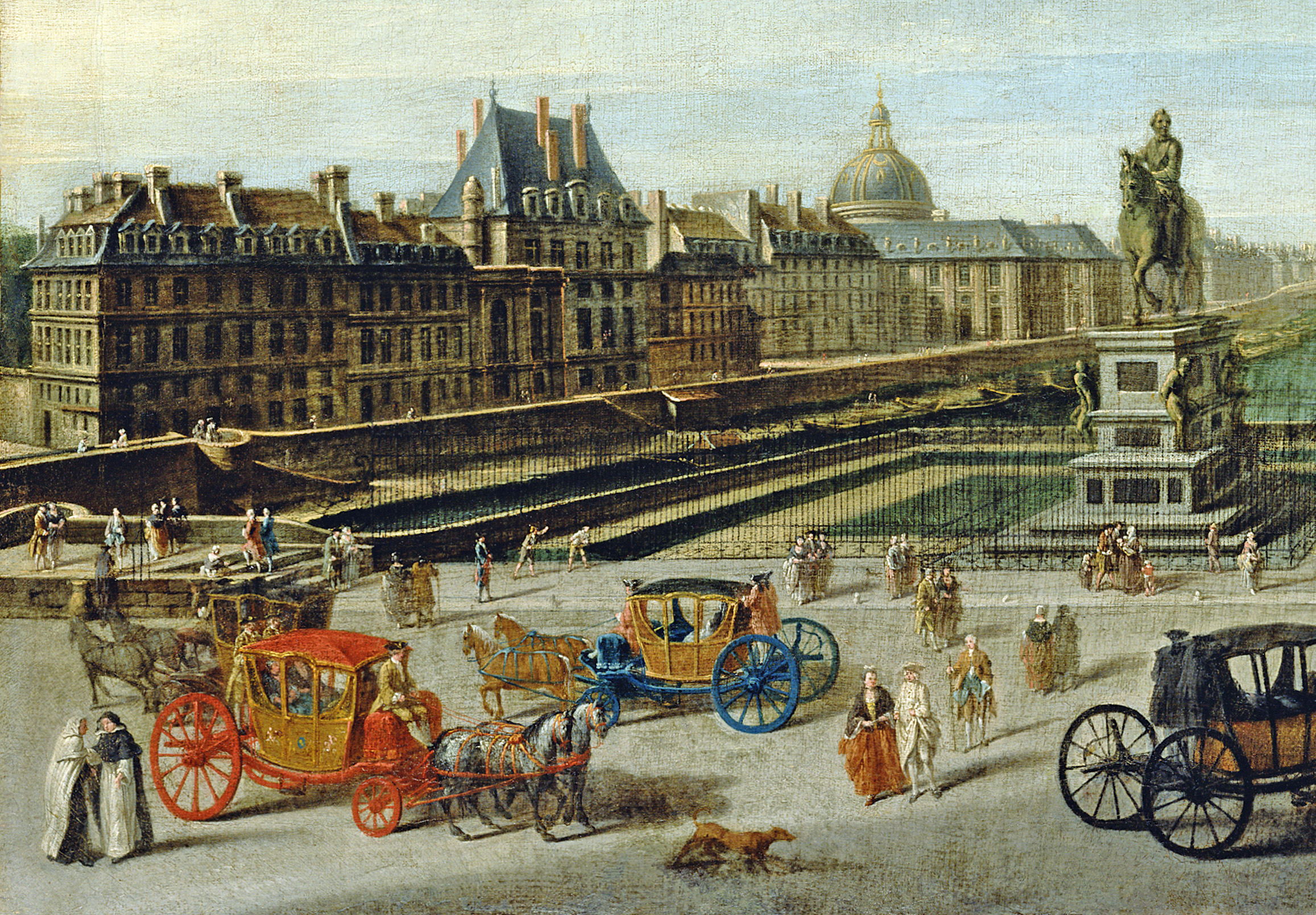
Detail from a painting by Nicolas Raguenet (1763)

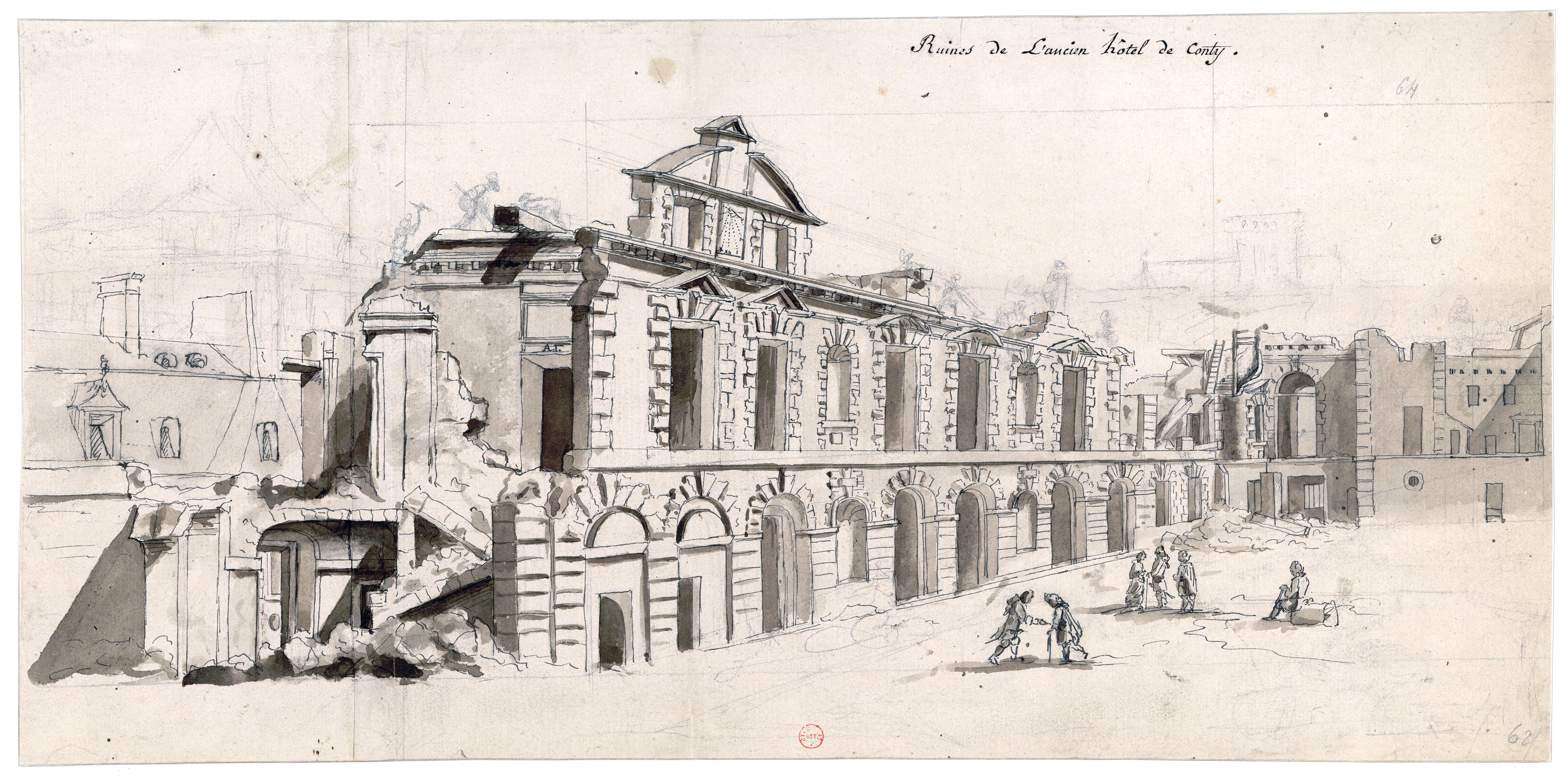
Demolition of the Hôtel de Conti c. 1770, view of the garden façade

== Bibliography ==
- Babelon, Jean-Pierre (1991). Demeures parisiennes sous Henri IV et Louis XIII. Paris: Hazan. ISBN 2850252514.
- Braham, Allan; Smith, Peter (1973). François Mansart. London: A. Zwemmer. ISBN 9780302022511.
- Gady, Alexandre (2008). Les Hôtels particuliers de Paris du Moyen Âge à la Belle Époque. Paris: Parigramme. ISBN 9782840962137.
- Mauban, André (1944). Jean Marot: Architecte et Graveur Parisien. Paris: Les Éditions d'Art et d'Histoire. OCLC 7057275.
- Thomson, David (1984). Renaissance Paris: Architecture and Growth 1475–1600. Berkeley and Los Angeles: University of California Press. ISBN 9780520053595 (paperback edition).
