= Tour du coin (Louvre) =

Demolished corner tower in Paris

- Part of wall of Philippe Auguste
- Paris in France
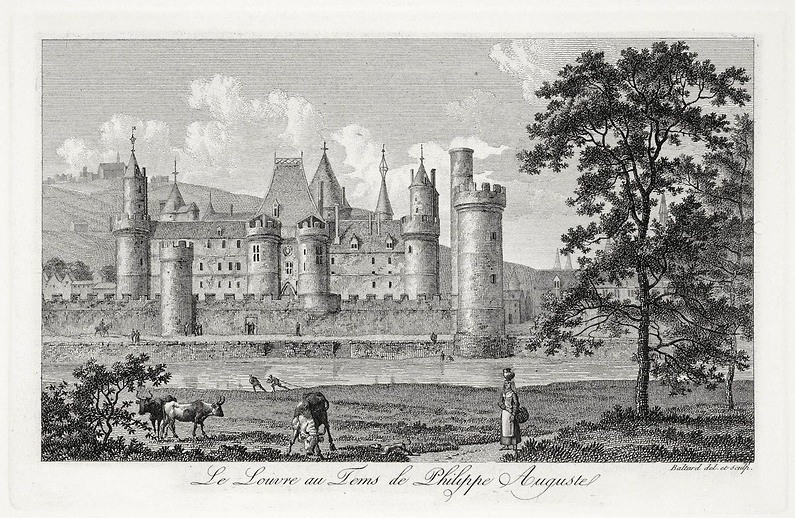
- The wall of the Louvre along the Seine with the tour du Coin on the right, reimagined in a 19th-century engraving

Site information
- Type: Corner tower
- Condition: Destroyed

Location
- Location of the tower in Paris
- Coordinates: 48.859294°N 2.337964°E
- Height: 25 meters

Site history
- Built: 1190-1209
- Built by: Philip II of France
- Materials: Stone
- Demolished: 1531 (partially), 1719 (totally)

The tour du coin (or tour de la conférence) was one of the corner towers of the ancient wall of Philip II Augustus in Paris, built between 1190 and 1209.

== The Tour du Coin of the wall of Philippe-Auguste ==
This is one of the four main towers of the wall that protected the city against attacks from the river Seine. It stood at the corner of the downstream side of the river (i.e. the west side of the wall) on the right bank, opposite to the Tour de Nesle on the left bank, approximately at the current location of the Pont des Arts. At night, they put chains on ships installed in the middle of the river connecting the two towers to prevent incursions from the river, creating a boom defence.

Upstream of the city and on each side of the river, the Tour Barbeau (right bank) and the Château de la Tournelle (left bank) had the same goal.

These four towers were 25 meters high and 10 m in diameter. The tour du coin look like the tour de Nesle, which is best known. Like on this one, there was, a cylindrical narrow tower used for the external staircase and higher than the top deck of the tower.

At that time, the Château du Louvre stood outside the enclosure, strengthening it on the North-West side in direction of Normandy at that time occupied by the English.

== Later developments ==
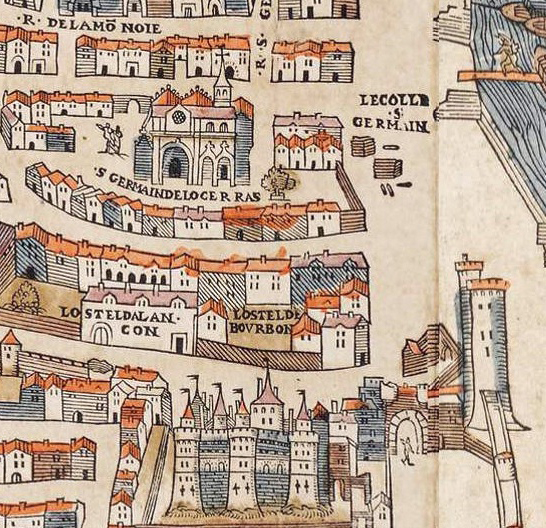
The tour du coin in 1550 (plan de Truschet & Hoyau)

The wall of Charles V was built on the right bank from 1356 to 1383 outside the walls of Philip Augustus. It enclosed the Louvre Castle.

On the new wall, a new westernmost tower, the Tour du Bois ("Tower of the wood") was built. However, the "tour du coin" was kept. A wall was built as a "return" between the Tour du Bois and the tour du coin along the river. The tour du coin remained necessary to prevent incursions of boats with the chains drawn through the river up to the Tour de Nesle on the left bank.

The main part of the tour du coin was demolished in 1531. The lowest part of the tower was destroyed only in 1719, with the reconstruction of the Quai du Louvre (Pier of Louvre).
