= Tour de Nesle =

Demolished guard tower of Parisian fortification wall

- Part of wall of Philippe Auguste
- Paris in France
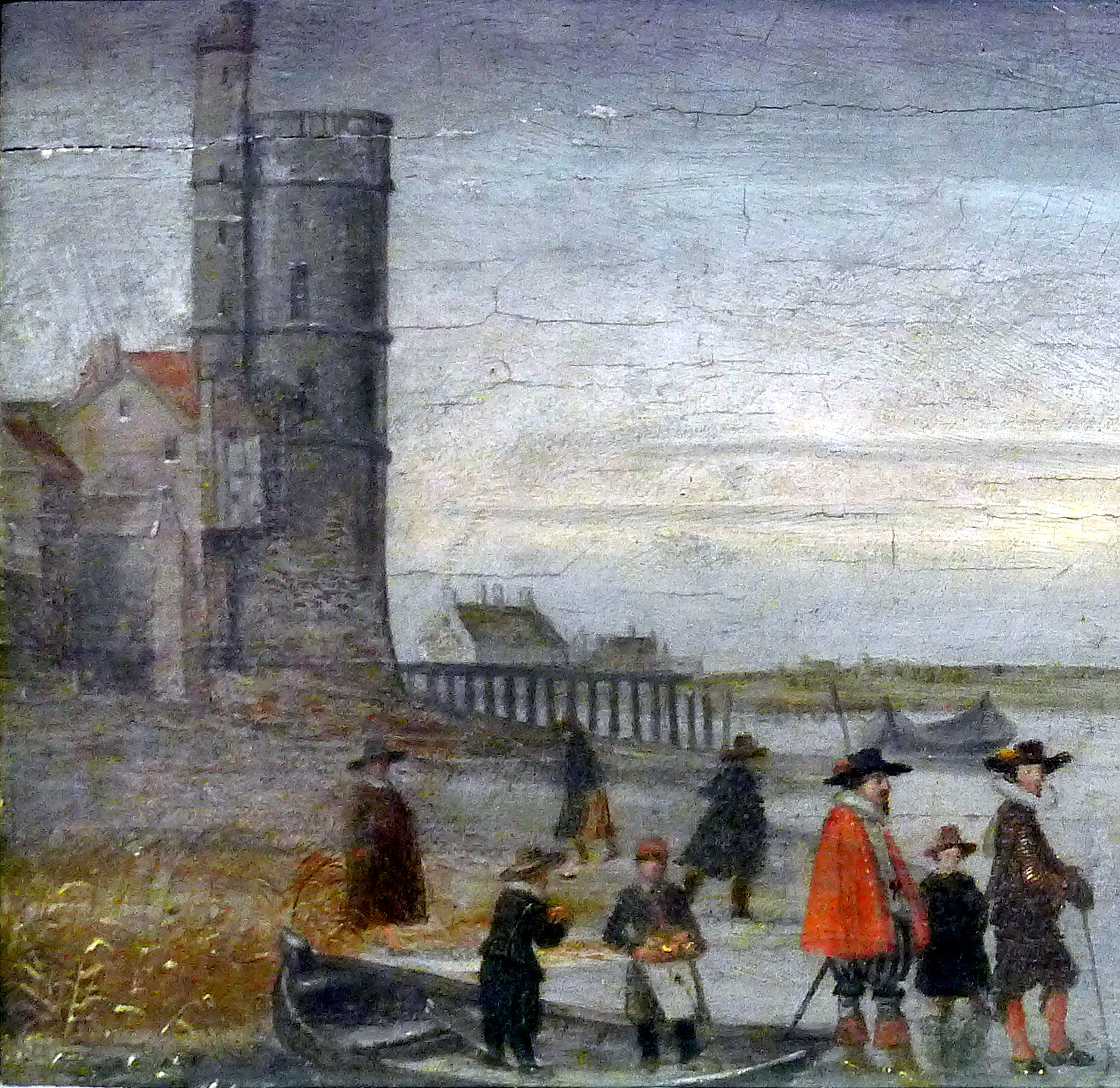
- Tour de Nesle in January 1608 (detail from Patineurs sur la Seine en 1608, Carnavalet Museum)

Site information
- Type: Corner tower
- Condition: Destroyed

Location
- Location of the tower in Paris
- Location within Paris
- Coordinates: 48.8575°N 2.337222°E
- Height: 25 meters

Site history
- Built: circa 1200
- Built by: Philippe Auguste
- Materials: Stone
- Demolished: 1665
- Events: Tour de Nesle Affair

The Tour de Nesle (French pronunciation: [tuʁ də nɛl]) was one of the four large guard towers on the old city wall of Paris, constructed at the beginning of the 13th century by Philip II of France and demolished in 1665.

The tower was situated on the left (south) bank of the Seine facing the old castle of the Louvre on the opposite bank. Originally known as the Tour Hamelin, it was a cylindrical structure of approximately 10 metres in diameter. The height was around 25 metres, with a stair turret reaching higher still. Later, the tower was incorporated into the Hôtel de Nesle, a medieval mansion.

On the right bank of the Seine river was a similar tall tower: the Tour du Coin (corner tower). The towers protected the upstream approach to the Île de la Cité.

In 1308, Philip IV bought the tower from Amaury de Nesle.

In 1314, a scandal known as the Tour de Nesle affair implicated the daughters-in-law of Philip IV, who were accused of adultery. Many of the alleged liaisons were said to have occurred in the Tour de Nesle. The scandal led to torture and execution for the princesses' lovers and the imprisonment of the princesses, with lasting consequences for the final years of the House of Capet.

In 1319, Philip V donated the building to his Queen Jeanne de Bourgogne (the one accused who was found innocent) and she, in her will, left it for the College of Burgundy, which she founded for the University of Paris. Demolished in 1665, mansion and tower became the place of the Collège des Quatre-Nations (later occupied by the Institut de France) with the Bibliothèque Mazarine.

== In popular culture ==
In the 19th century, Alexandre Dumas wrote the celebrated romance La Tour de Nesle (1832), in which he portrayed the place as a theatre of orgy and the place of murder of a Queen of France at the beginning of the 14th century, (likely Margaret of Burgundy). His story is based on the fifteenth-century legend based on events alleged to have taken place in 1314.

The story was also the basis of a 1955 film known in English as Tower of Lust (French: La Tour de Nesle).

Le Roi de fer (1955), the first novel of Maurice Druon's seven-volume series Les Rois maudits (The Accursed Kings), describes the affair and the subsequent executions in lurid and imaginative detail.

== Gallery ==
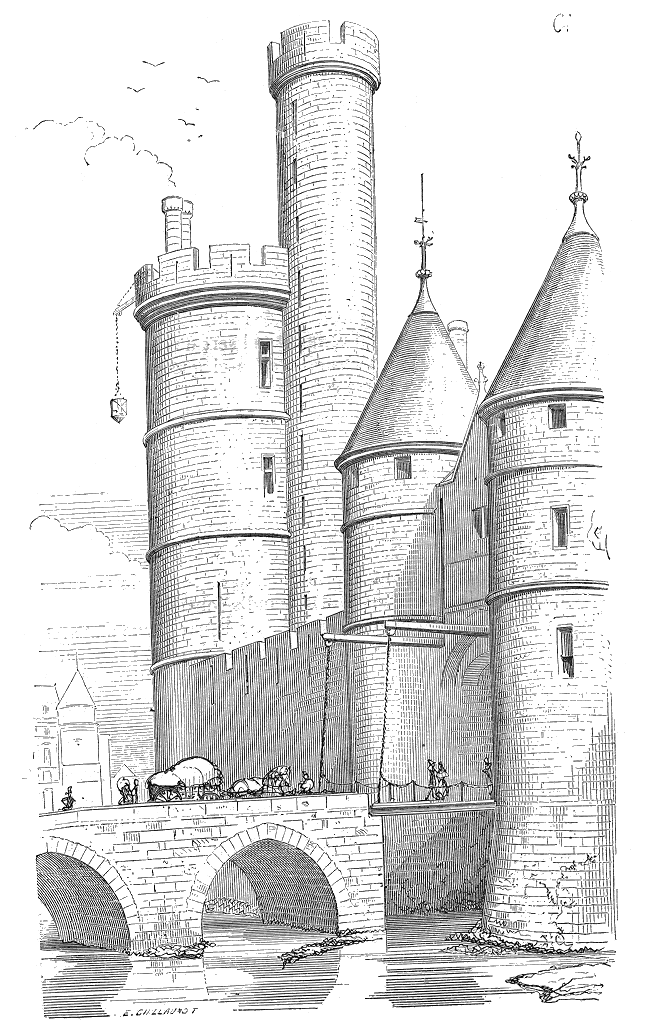
The Tour de Nesle in the medieval period as imagined by Viollet-le-Duc. View to the northwest and Seine river. The Porte de Nesle is the gate at center-right.

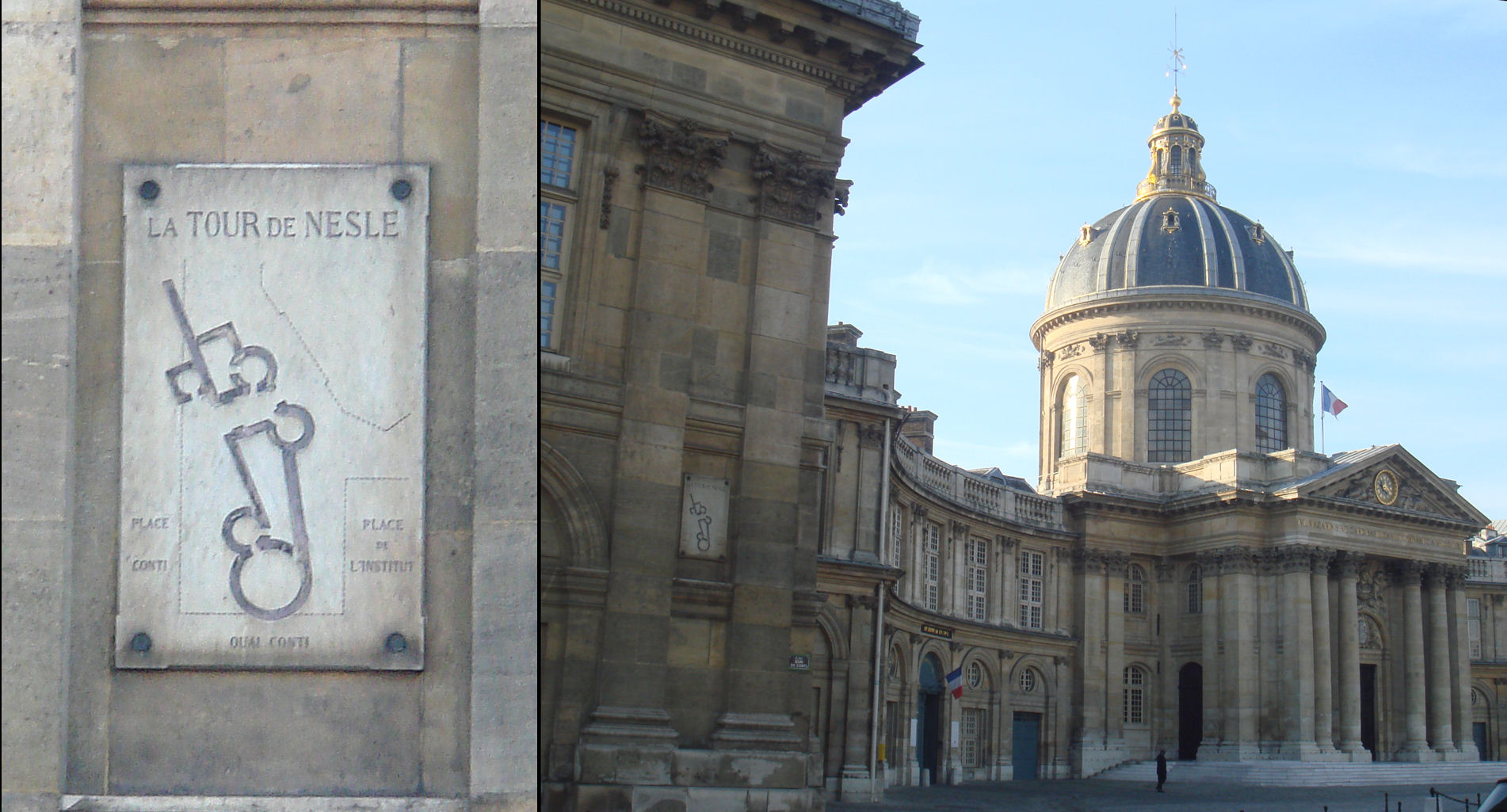
A plaque on the northern wall of the Institut de France shows the former location of the Tour de Nesle.

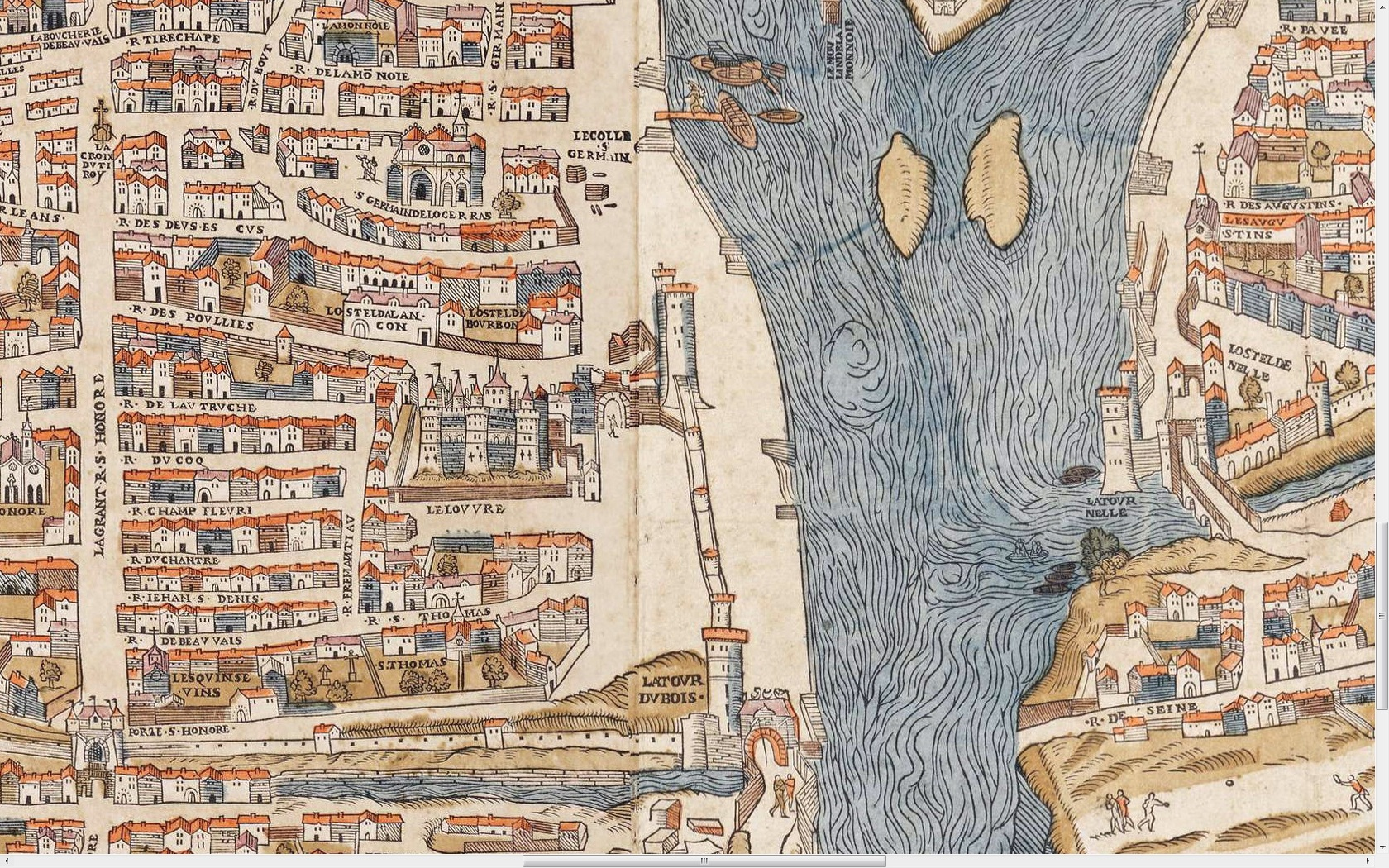
Tower and hôtel de Nesle with on the other side of the river the Palais du Louvre (Plan de Truschet & Hoyau, circa 1550)

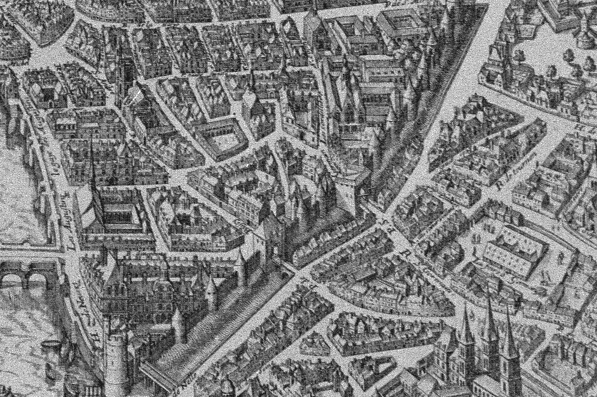
Plan de Mérian (1615) : at bottom, the tour de Nesle, the Hôtel de Nevers, and the ditch

The Tour de Nesle in 1652, shortly before its demolition. Engraving by Israel Silvestre
