= Wall of Charles V =

City wall of Paris built by Charles V of France

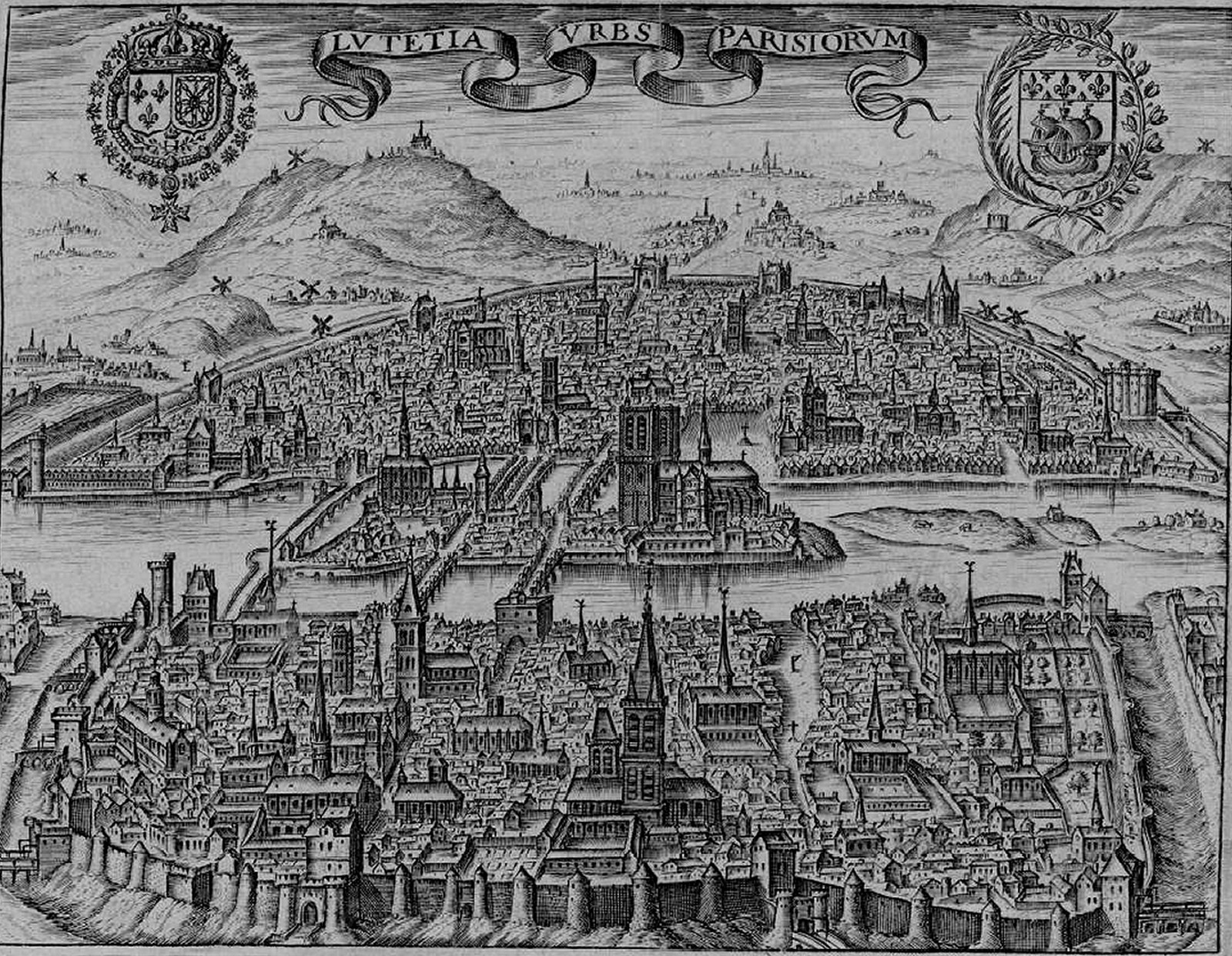
View of Paris in the 1600s with the wall of Philippe Auguste (in the foreground) and the wall of Charles V (at the top of picture)

The wall of Charles V, built from 1356 to 1383 is one of the city walls of Paris built on orders granted by Charles V of France. It was built on the right bank of the river Seine outside the wall of Philippe Auguste. In the 1640s, the western part of the wall of Charles V was demolished and replaced by the larger Louis XIII wall, with the demolished material reused for the new wall. This new enclosure (enceinte) was completely destroyed in the 1670s and was replaced by the Grands Boulevards.

== History ==
=== The wall of Philippe Auguste ===
The wall of Philippe Auguste was created at the beginning of the 13th century and enclosed 253 hectares with houses and vegetable and vine fields allowing people to protect from a possible military siege. But decades later, the fields had been replaced by homes and crops had been pushed outside the city walls. Several suburbs were growing rapidly, particularly in the west. The growing population could no longer be contained in the city. Furthermore, with the Hundred Years War, it became necessary to build a new enclosure to protect the capital of France.

=== A rampart of fortified earth ===
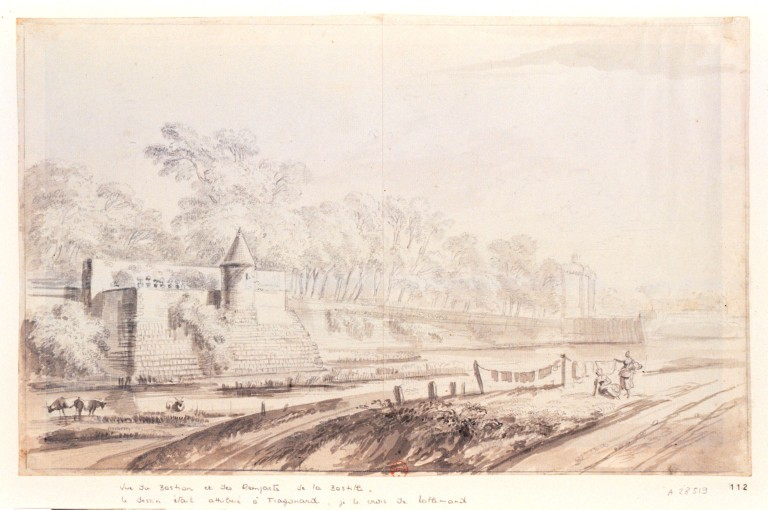
The bastion and the walls of la Bastille in the eighteenth century

Étienne Marcel, provost of the merchants, began to build a moat from 1356, a few hundred yards beyond the wall of Philippe Auguste. Only the right side was affected by this expansion. King Charles V, from 1358, ordered the fortification and the addition of a large and deep ditch that would be filled by the river Seine.

The new fortification extended westward beyond the Louvre, which lost its function as a fortress. Charles V transformed the Louvre into a residence, but without changing its dimensions. He established a library there with 973 books.

On the east, the new home of the King, the Hotel Saint-Pol, was poorly protected. Charles V decided to build the Chastel Saint-Antoine, the Parisians called it the Bastide Saint-Antoine, then la Bastille (Bastide or Bastille is an old French word for castle). In 1370, the provost Hugues Aubriot laid the cornerstone of the building which was completed in 1382. The city then spread over 440 hectares (1,100 acres) with more than 150,000 inhabitants.

The wall, as well as its extension built by Louis XIII on the west side was destroyed in 1670, on orders of Louis XIV after his victories in the Netherlands and Germany.

== The route ==
Traces of the wall of Charles V

The wall left the Seine at the Tour du Bois between the Pont du Carrousel and the Pont Royal. Then the wall was north of the Rue Saint-Honoré and Palais-Royal then to north-east along the Place des Victoires and the Rue d'Aboukir (opened on the location of the moat) up to the Porte Saint-Denis. It then followed the Grands Boulevards (Boulevard de Bonne-Nouvelle, Boulevard Saint-Martin, Boulevard du Temple, Boulevard des Filles-du-Calvaire, Boulevard Beaumarchais). The wall returned to the Seine on the east at the Tour de Billy.

The wall on the left bank of the river, built by Philippe-Auguste was kept, leaving the new faubourg Saint-Germain outside the walls.

== The gates ==
The wall on the right bank included only six gates :

- Porte Saint-Honoré (on the Rue Saint-Honoré, about 500 meters outside of the wall of Philippe Auguste)
- Porte Montmartre (on Rue Montmartre, at the junction with the Rue d'Aboukir)
- Porte Saint-Denis
- Porte Saint-Martin
- Porte du Temple (in the location of the current Place de la République)
- Porte Saint-Antoine (the location of the current Place de la Bastille)

== Bibliography ==
- Danielle Chadych et Dominique Leborgne : Atlas de Paris, Parigramme, 2002, ISBN 2-84096-249-7.
- This page is a translation of its French equivalent.
