= Bourbon-Penthièvre =

Illegitimate branch of the House of Bourbon, descending from the Capetian dynasty

House of Bourbon-Penthièvre (Légitimé de France)
- Parent house: House of Bourbon (legitimised royal branch)
- Country: France
- Founded: 1725; 301 years ago
- Founder: Comte de Toulouse under Bourbon-Toulouse; Duc de Penthièvre under Bourbon-Penthièvre
- Titles: Prince de Lamballe; Prince of Carignano; Comte de Toulouse; Duc de Penthièvre; Duc de Rambouillet (1737); duc d'Aumale (1775); Duc de Gisors; Duc de Châteauvillain; Duc d'Arc-en-Barrois; Duc d'Amboise; Duc de Carignan; Comte d'Eu; comte de Guingamp
- Dissolution: 1793; 233 years ago

Styles of Duke of Penthièvre
- Reference style: His Serene Highness
- Spoken style: Your Serene Highness

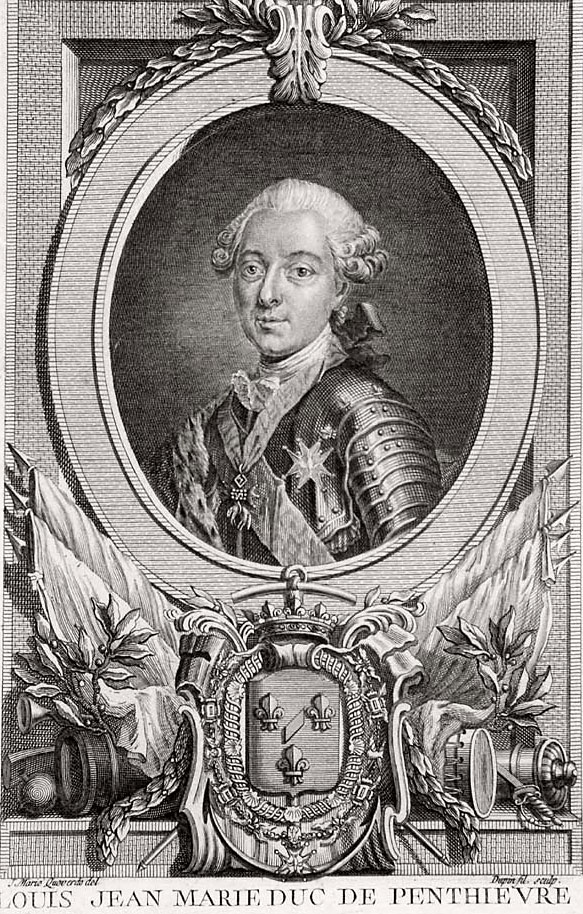
The duc de Penthièvre.

The House of Bourbon-Penthièvre was an illegitimate branch of the French House of Bourbon, thus descending from the Capetian dynasty. It was founded by the duc de Penthièvre (1725–1793), the only child and heir of the comte de Toulouse, the youngest illegitimate son of Louis XIV and Madame de Montespan, and his wife, Marie Victoire de Noailles, the daughter of Anne Jules de Noailles, duc de Noailles.

== Bourbon-Toulouse ==
The House of Bourbon-Penthièvre, sometimes called: House of Bourbon-Toulouse-Penthièvre, had been called the House of Bourbon-Toulouse during the lifetime of the duc de Penthièvre's father, the comte de Toulouse. The comte had received his title in 1681 as an appanage from his father, Louis XIV, and his residence in Paris, the Hôtel de Toulouse was named after this title. Upon his death, his descendants were members of the House of Bourbon-Penthièvre.

Due to the illegitimate birth of the comte de Toulouse, members of the House of Bourbon-Penthièvre were not Princes and Princesses du Sang, although they held a high rank at court as members of the king's family, and lived in apartments near those of the king in Versailles. Because of the death, in 1768, of the prince de Lamballe, the son of the duc de Penthièvre, and the only heir to the title, the House of Bourbon-Penthièvre became extinct at the death of the duc in 1793, after having merged with the House of Orléans through the marriage of Mlle de Penthièvre, to the duc de Chartres. (The title of duc de Penthièvre was revived briefly in 1820 for Charles d'Orléans (1820–1828), the fourth son of Louis Philippe I, King of the French.) At the death, in 1775, of Louis Charles, Count of Eu, son of the duc du Maine who had been a beneficiary of several great estates (the county of Eu, the duchy of Aumale and the principality of Dombes) of La Grande Mademoiselle (Louis XIV's cousin), the duc de Penthièvre was the sole heir of the duc du Maine's fortune, which, added to his own, made the Bourbon-Toulouse-Penthièvre family, consisting solely of the duc de Penthièvre and the duchesse de Chartres, the richest in France up to the Revolution of 1789.

The House of Bourbon-Penthièvre is not only related to the modern day royal House of Orléans, but also, through the marriages of several of Louis-Philippe's children, to the royal houses of Belgium, Brazil, and Portugal.

== Members of the family ==
As he inherited not only his father's fortune, but that of his cousins, the duc de Penthièvre was said to be, and probably was the wealthiest man in France. In 1744, he married Marie Thérèse Félicité d'Este, princesse de Modène (1726–1754), the daughter of Francesco III d'Este, the sovereign Duke of Modena and Reggio. The couple was said to have been very happy. They had seven children, but only two survived infancy, and the duchesse de Penthièvre died in childbirth on April 30, 1754.:

1. Louis Marie de Bourbon (born in 1746, died as a child);
2. Louis-Alexandre de Bourbon (1747–1768), married the Princess Marie Thérèse Louise of Savoy-Carignan (1749–1792), who became a close friend of Marie Antoinette;
3. Jean Marie de Bourbon, duc de Châteauvillain (1748–1755);
4. Vincent Marie Louis de Bourbon, comte de Guingamp (1750–1752);
5. Marie Louise de Bourbon (1751–1753);
6. Louise Marie Adélaïde de Bourbon, called Mademoiselle de Penthièvre (1753–1821), married to Louis Philippe II, Duke of Orléans (Philippe Égalité during the French Revolution of 1789);
7. Louis Marie Félicité de Bourbon (born and died in 1754).

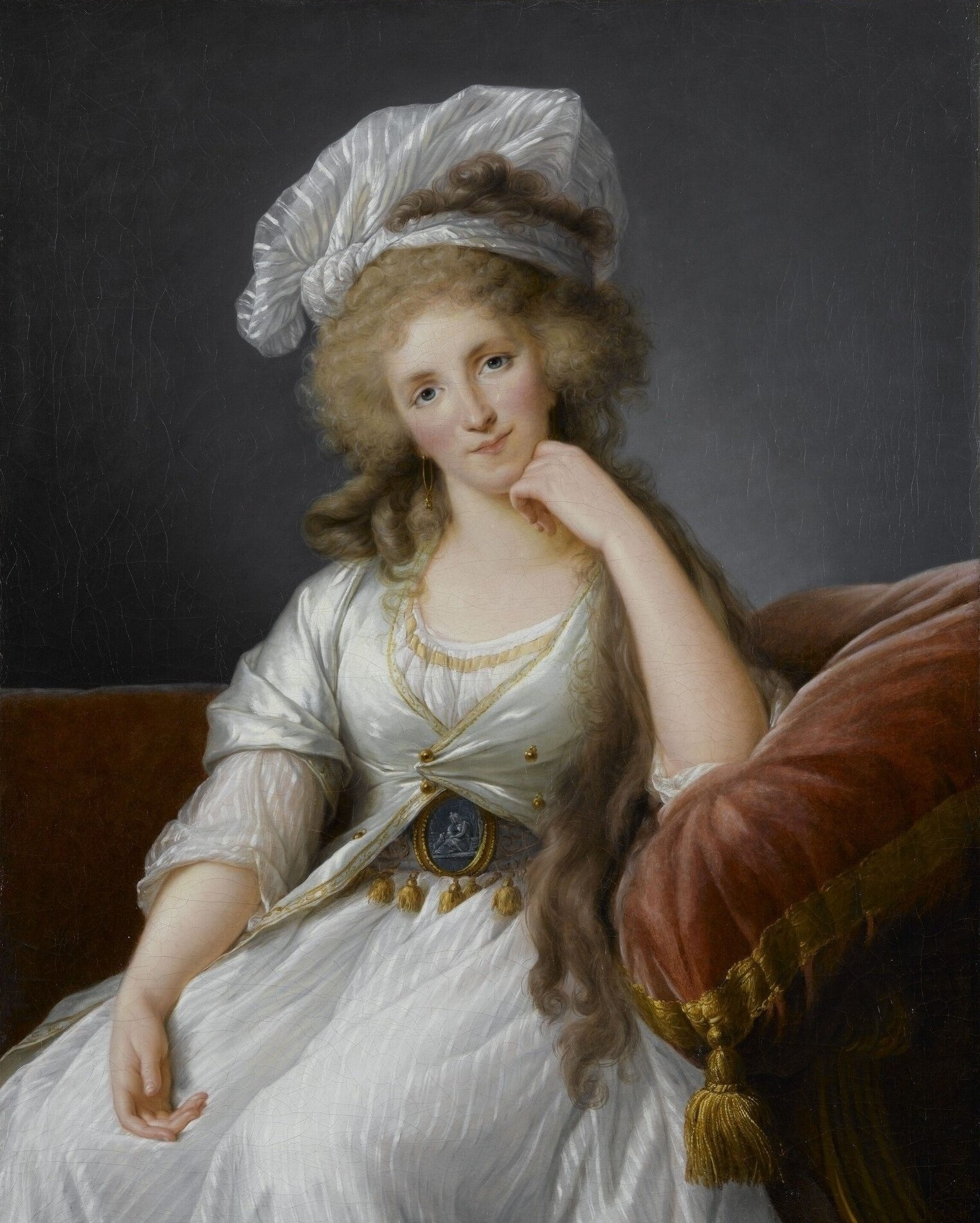
Marie Adélaïde, duchesse d'Orléans and her father's eventual heiress. Painting by Élisabeth-Louise Vigée-Le Brun.

== Titles ==
The following titles belonged to the House of Bourbon-Penthièvre:

- duc de Penthièvre - title of the head of the family,
- prince de Lamballe - this was used as the courtesy title of the oldest son before he succeeded to the title of duc de Penthièvre,
- prince de Carignan - this title was bought by the duc in 1751 from the House of Savoy. He later gave it to his daughter.
- duc de Rambouillet (1737) - this title was derived from one of the family possessions, the château de Rambouillet, which was the birthplace of Louis Jean Marie de Bourbon, duc de Penthièvre,
- duc d'Aumale (1775),
- duc de Gisors,
- duc de Châteauvillain,
- duc d'Arc-en-Barrois,
- duc d'Amboise,
- duc de Carignan,
- comte d'Eu
- comte de Guingamp

Louis Jean Marie de Bourbon was created duc de Penthièvre on his birth in 1725 and, as the only child of the comte de Toulouse, he inherited from his father not only his fortune and titles, but his posts as:

- Amiral de France (Admiral of France),
- Grand Maître de France, (Grand Master of France),
- Grand Veneur de France, (Grand Huntsman of France),
- Maréchal de France , (Marshal of France),
- Gouverneur de Bretagne, (Governor of Brittany).

== Bourbon-Penthièvre Wealth and Residences ==
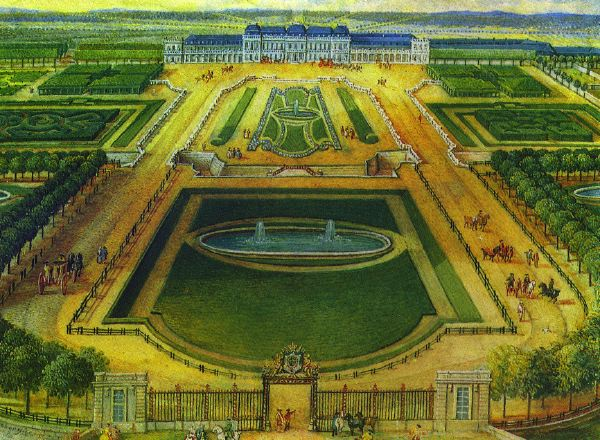
View of the Château de Chanteloup

Part of the vast wealth accumulated by the duc de Penthièvre originally derived from the fortune of La Grande Mademoiselle, the first cousin of King Louis XIV. The duc du Maine's fortune was supplemented with many expensive gifts from his adoring father, the king. The duc had two sons, both of whom were childless, and when his last living son, Louis-Charles de Bourbon, comte d'Eu, died in 1775, the duc de Penthièvre was the sole heir to his fortune. The châteaux of Sceaux, Anet, Aumale, Dreux and Gisors were part of this huge inheritance.

In addition, the duc de Penthièvre was the only heir of his father, the comte de Toulouse, from whom he inherited the Hôtel de Toulouse in Paris, and the Château de Rambouillet.

The death of his son, the prince de Lamballe, in 1768, had left the duc de Penthièvre with no male heir and, as a result, his daughter, Mlle de Penthièvre, was his sole heiress.

Louise Marie Adélaïde de Bourbon was first known as Mademoiselle d'Ivoy, then Mademoiselle de Penthièvre. In April 1769, she married her distant cousin, the duc de Chartres, who inherited the title of duc d'Orléans at the death of his father, Louis-Philippe I d'Orléans in 1785, but took the name Philippe Egalité during the French Revolution of 1789. Mlle de Penthièvre had brought with her a dowry of 6 million livres, and an annual allowance of over 500,000 livres. Upon the death of the duc de Penthièvre in 1793, the Bourbon-Penthièvre fortune Louise Adélaïde was to inherit was confiscated by the revolutionary government. It is only after her return to France during the First Bourbon Restoration of 1814 that she was able, through numerous legal battles, to regain what was left of some of her land estates, many of them having been either sold, gutted or nearly destroyed during the Revolution.

=== The Residences ===
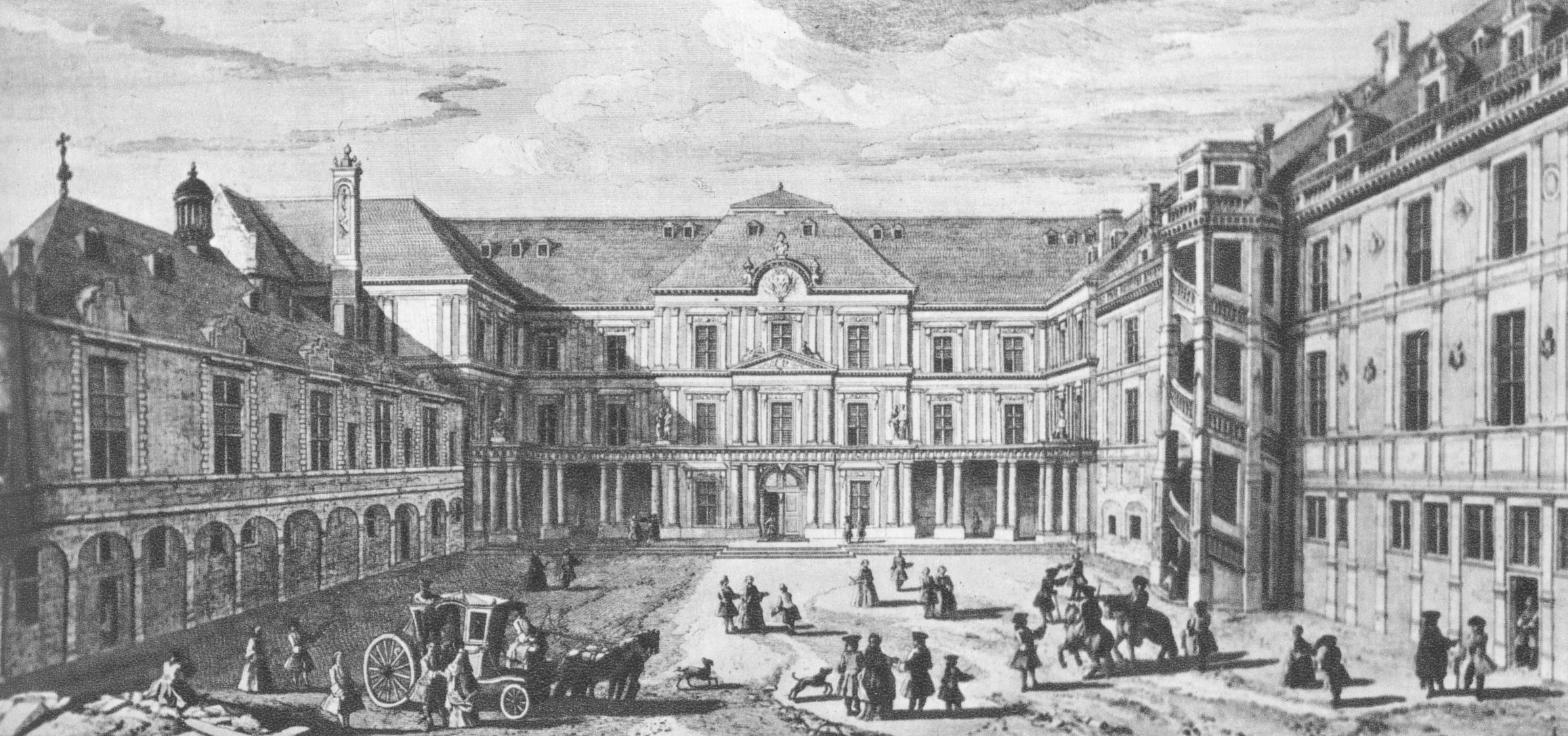
The Château de Blois by Jacques Rigaud.

- Hôtel de Toulouse,
  - bought by the comte de Toulouse in 1712, it was the family's residence in Paris, and the birthplace of the comte's granddaughter, Louise Marie Adélaïde;
- Château de Sceaux;
  - the Bourbon du Maine country residence;
- Château de Rambouillet;
  - a medieval castle transformed by the comte de Toulouse, was the birthplace of the duc de Penthièvre,
- Château d'Anet;
  - had been built for Diane de Poitiers, a mistress of Henry II of France
- Château de Blois;
  - an elegant and much restored château in the Loire Valley, was the childhood home of La Grande Mademoiselle, the source of most of the Bourbon-Penthièvre wealth;
- Château de La Ferté-Vidame;
  - had been the home of the duc de Saint-Simon, the notoriously acidic observer of the court of Louis XIV.
- Château de Chanteloup;
  - was acquired after the death, in 1785, of the duc de Choiseul,
- Château d'Aumale,
- Château de Dreux,
- Château de Gisors,
- Château de Saint-Hubert,
- Château d'Amboise,
- Château de Châteauneuf-sur-Loire.

At the Palace of Versailles, the family also occupied a suite of apartments located on the ground floor of the Palace underneath the Grand Appartement du roi. Originally called the Appartements des Bains, they were the former apartments of Françoise-Athénaïs de Montespan, the mother of the duc du Maine, the comte de Toulouse, the duchesse d'Orléans and the princesse de Condé.

=== Chapelle royale de Dreux ===
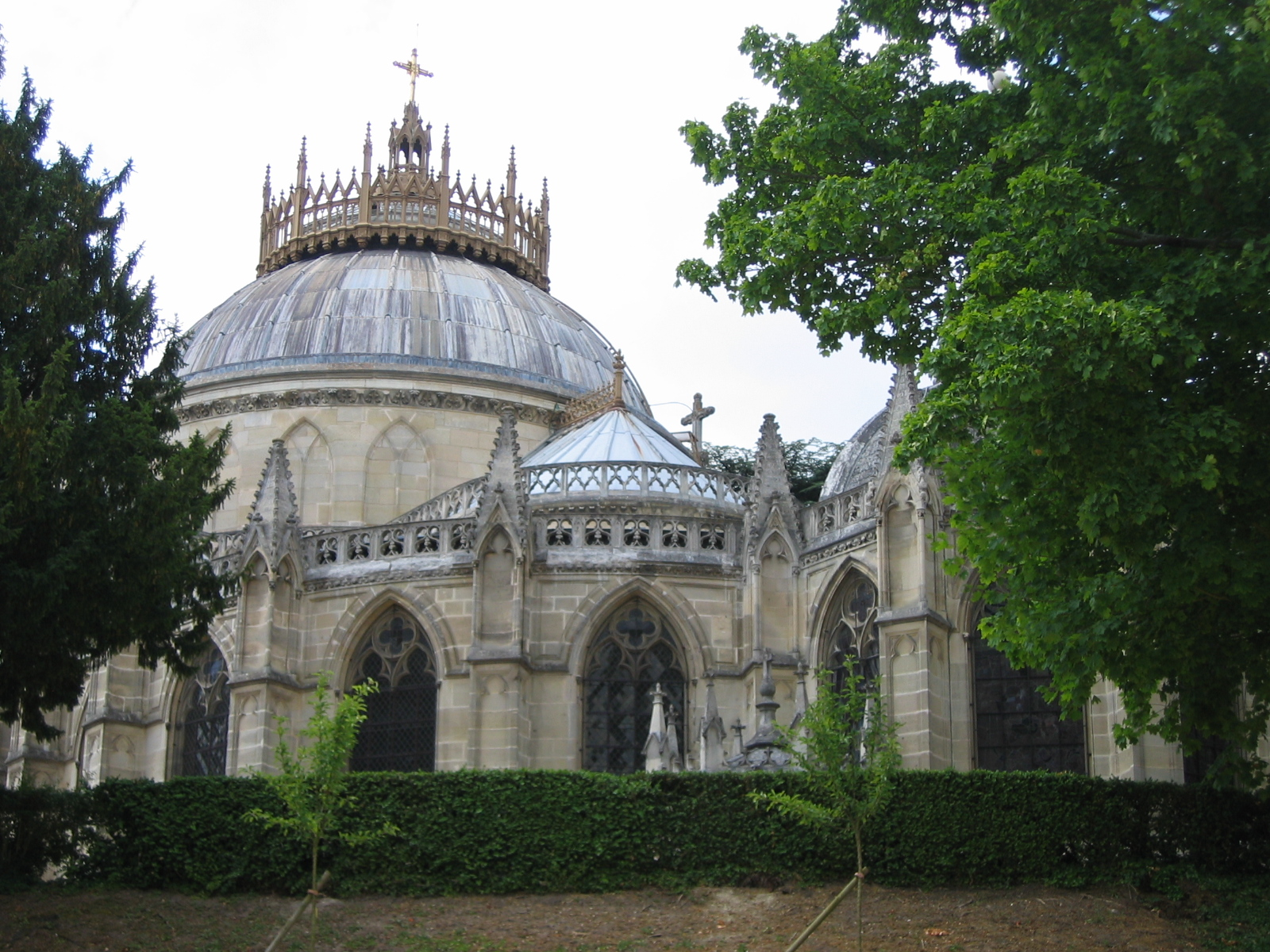
The Chapelle royale de Dreux

On November 25, 1783, after having sold the Château de Rambouillet, to his cousin Louis XVI, who had given him the comté de Dreux, (County of Dreux) in 1775, the duc de Penthièvre transferred the nine bodies of his family from the 12th century Saint-Lubin church in Rambouillet to the Collégiale Saint-Étienne de Dreux. He himself was buried there in March 1793. On November 21, 1793, the crypt was desecrated by the revolutionaries and the bodies thrown into a grave in the Chanoines cemetery, the cemetery of the Collégiale. In 1816, the duc de Penthièvre's daughter, Louise Marie Adélaïde de Bourbon, duchesse d'Orléans, had a chapel built, on the site of the grave, as the new final resting place for the members of the House of Bourbon-Penthièvre. Today, the Chapelle royale de Dreux is the burial place of the members of the royal House of Orléans, into which the House of Bourbon-Penthièvre had merged when its heiress, Mlle de Penthièvre, married the duc de Chartres in 1769.

Among the seventy-five members of both families buried in the new chapel are:

- the comte de Toulouse, founder of the family,
- the comtesse de Toulouse, his wife,
- the duc de Penthièvre, their son,
- the duchesse de Penthièvre, his wife,
- the prince de Lamballe, their son,
- Mlle de Penthièvre, future duchesse d'Orléans, their daughter,
- the princesse de Condé, the duchesse d'Orléans's sister-in-law,
- Louis-Philippe, King of the French, son of the duchesse d'Orléans.

Of the members of the Toulouse-Penthièvre family who predeceased Louise Adélaïde de Bourbon, the only one not buried in the newly built chapel is the princesse de Lamballe. After her "execution", her body and head were buried separately, at different times, and probably not in the same mass grave in the Enfants-Trouvés cemetery in Paris. Later attempts to find her remains proved unsuccessful.

== List of ducs de Penthièvre ==
The title of Penthièvre was in the possession of several noble families during the Ancien Régime. It has been used twice within the House of Bourbon, once as a comté and once as a duché. Previously it had passed by marriage from the Luxembourg (as a duché) to the Lorraine (as a comté) then to the Bourbon-Vendôme (again as a comté) families.

=== House of Luxembourg ===
- Sebastian (1566–1569), nephew of John VII
- Marie (1569–1623), married Philippe Emmanuel de Lorraine and was duchesse de Penthièvre in her own right.

=== House of Lorraine ===
- Philippe Emmanuel de Lorraine (1576–1602);
- Françoise de Lorraine (1602–1669), married César de Vendôme (see below) and was daughter of the above. She held the title of comtesse de Penthièvre in her own right.

=== House of Bourbon-Vendôme ===
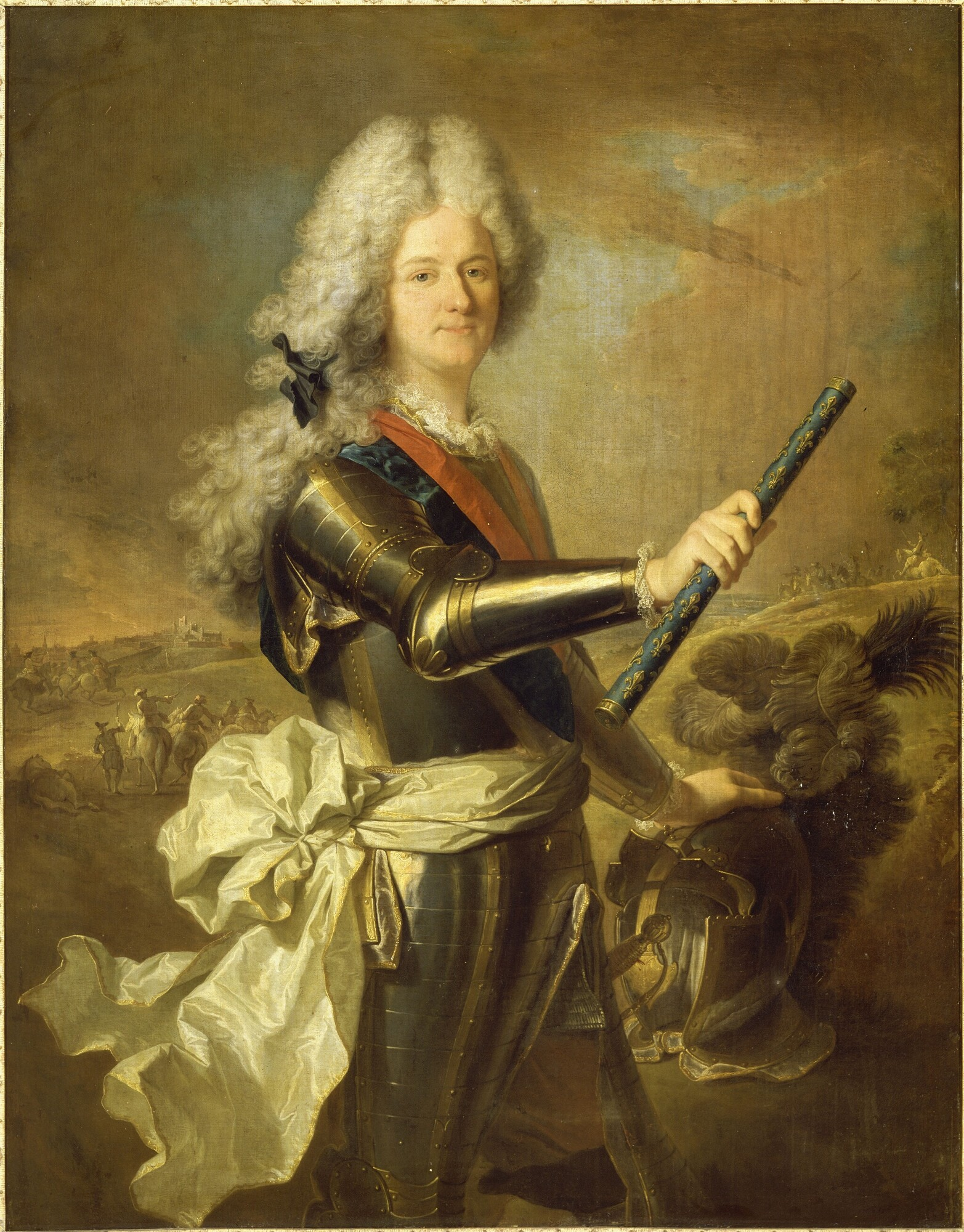
Louis-Alexandre de Bourbon, comte de Toulouse was the first to hold the title of duc de Penthièvre in over half a century. He was the founder of the House of Bourbon-Toulouse, the original name of the House of Bourbon-Penthièvre

.

The House of Bourbon-Vendôme had the title of comte de Penthièvre:

- César de Bourbon (1608–1665), illegitimate son of Henry IV of France;
- Louis de Bourbon (1665–1669), son of the previous;
- Louis Joseph de Bourbon (1669–1712), son of the previous.
  - The title of Penthièvre was not revived as a dukedom until it was given to Louis-Alexandre de Bourbon, comte de Toulouse in 1697. The comte de Toulouse chose to use it as the courtesy title of his son.

=== House of Bourbon-Toulouse / Penthièvre ===
- Louis Alexandre (1697–1737), comte de Toulouse, duc de Rambouillet, illegitimate son of Louis XIV and Madame de Montespan;
- Louis Jean Marie (1737–1793), duc de Penthièvre, son of the previous.

=== House of Orléans ===
==== Second restoration ====
- Charles d'Orléans (1820–1828), son of Louis Philippe I, King of the French, and great-grandson of Louis Jean Marie de Bourbon, duc de Penthièvre.

==== July Monarchy ====
- Pierre d'Orléans (1845–1848), son of François d'Orléans, prince de Joinville, and grandson of Louis Philippe I, King of the French.

== Ancestry of the Bourbon-Penthièvres ==
8. Louis XIII of France
4. Louis XIV of France
9. Anne of Austria
2. Louis-Alexandre de Bourbon, comte de Toulouse
10. Gabriel de Rochechouart, duc de Mortemart
5. Françoise-Athénaïs, marquise de Montespan
11. Diane de Grandseigne
1. House of Bourbon-Toulouse-Penthièvre
12. Anne, 1st duc de Noailles
6. Anne-Jules, 2nd duc de Noailles
13. Louise Boyer
3. Marie Victoire de Noailles
14. -
7. Marie-Françoise de Bournonville
15. -

== Other illegitimate houses ==
- Bourbon-Busset
- Bourbon-Maine (extinct; related to the House of Bourbon-Penthièvre through the comte de Toulouse's older brother, the duc du Maine)
- Second house of Bourbon-Vendôme (extinct)
