= Jean Marie, Duke of Châteauvillain =

French duke; great-grandson of Louis XIV (1748–1755)

Jean Marie
- Duke of Châteauvillain
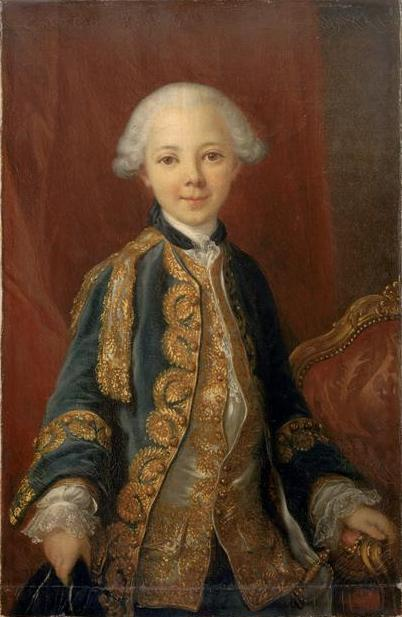
- Portrait by Joseph Albrier
- Born: 17 July 1748; Hôtel de Toulouse, Paris, France
- Died: 19 May 1755 (aged 6); Hôtel de Toulouse, Paris, France
- Burial: Royal Chapel, Dreux, France
Names
- Jean Marie de Bourbon
- House: Bourbon
- Father: Louis Jean Marie de Bourbon
- Mother: Princess Maria Teresa d'Este

Jean Marie de Bourbon, Duke of Châteauvillain (17 July 1748 – 19 May 1755) was a French prince of the Blood. He died in Paris at the age of 6. He was the duc de Châteauvillain from birth.

== Biography ==
Jean Marie was born in Paris at the Hôtel de Toulouse, Parisian townhouse of the fabulously wealthy Duke of Penthièvre. Penthièvre was the only legitimate son of Louis Alexandre, Count of Toulouse, who was in turn the illegitimate son of King Louis XIV and Madame de Montespan.

His mother Maria Teresa Felicitas d'Este was also a descendant of Louis XIV and Montespan, her mother Charlotte Aglaé d'Orléans being their granddaughter and child of Philippe d'Orléans, Régent of France. Jean Marie was created duc de Châteauvillain at his birth, one of the many titles his father possessed. At the time of his birth in 1748, his parents, who were devoted to each other, already had two other sons, Louis Marie born in 1746 and the Prince of Lamballe. At the early death of Louis Jean in 1749, Lamballe became the heir of one of the largest fortunes in Europe.

As a prince of the Blood (Prince du Sang), Jean Marie was allowed the style of Serene Highness and was one of the most important males at court after the King, the Dauphin, the Dukes of Orléans, Chartres, Montpensier, his own father and older brother Lamballe.

His mother died in 1754 in childbirth bringing Louis Marie Félicité into the world. Louis Marie himself would die sometime after birth. Jean Marie's father never married again. The next year Jean Marie himself would die in Paris. Buried at the Chapel at the Château de Rambouillet, his father's favourite residence. His sister Louise Marie Adélaïde de Bourbon, future Duchess of Orléans would move Jean Marie's body to the Royal Chapel, Dreux; Dreux is today the burial site of the Royal House of Orléans which descends from Marie Adélaïde and her husband, Philippe Égalité. The painting of Jean Marie by Louis Michel van Loo is today held at the Musée national du Château de Versailles.

== Ancestry ==
Ancestors of Jean Marie, Duke of Châteauvillain

8. Louis XIV of France
4. Louis Alexandre de Bourbon, Count of Toulouse
9. Madame de Montespan
2. Louis Jean Marie de Bourbon, Duke of Penthièvre
10. Anne Jules de Noailles, 2nd Duke of Noailles
5. Marie Victoire de Noailles
11. Marie-Françoise de Bournonville
1.Jean Marie de Bourbon
12. Rinaldo d'Este, Duke of Modena
6. Francesco III d'Este, Duke of Modena
13. Princess Charlotte Felicity of Brunswick
3. Princess Maria Teresa Felicitas of Modena
14. Philippe d'Orléans, Duke of Orléans, Regent of France
7. Charlotte Aglaé d'Orléans
15. Françoise-Marie de Bourbon
