= Vincent de Bourbon, Count of Guingamp =

French duke; great-grandson of Louis XIV (1750–1752)

Vincent de Bourbon
- Count of Guingamp
- Born: 22 June 1750; Hôtel de Toulouse, Paris, France
- Died: 14 March 1752 (aged 1); Palace of Versailles, France
- Burial: Royal Chapel, Dreux, France
Names
- Vincent Marie Louis de Bourbon
- House: Bourbon
- Father: Louis Jean Marie de Bourbon, Duke of Penthièvre
- Mother: Princess Maria Teresa d'Este

Vincent Marie Louis (22 June 1750 – 14 March 1752) was the son of Louis Jean Marie de Bourbon, Duke of Penthièvre and Maria Teresa d’Este. He died before his second birthday.

== Life ==
Vincent was born on 22 June 1750 in France. He was the fourth child born to Louis Jean Marie de Bourbon, Duke of Penthièvre and Princess Maria Teresa d'Este. His only brother to survive childhood was Louis Alexandre, Prince of Lamballe.

Vincent died at the Palace of Versailles in his mother's suite of rooms. Years after his death, his posthumous sister, Louise Marie Adélaïde de Bourbon, moved his remains to the Royal Chapel of Dreux.

== Ancestry ==
Ancestors of Vincent de Bourbon, Count of Guingamp

16. Louis XIII of France
8. Louis XIV of France
17. Anne of Austria
4. Louis-Alexandre de Bourbon, comte de Toulouse
18. Gabriel de Rochechouart, 1st Duke of Mortemart
9. Madame de Montespan
19. Diane de Grandseigne
2. Louis Jean Marie de Bourbon, Duke of Penthièvre
20. Anne de Noailles, 1st Duke of Noailles
10. Anne Jules de Noailles, 2nd Duke of Noailles
21. Louise Boyer
5. Marie Victoire de Noailles
22. Ambroise, Duke of Bournonville
11. Marie Françoise de Bournonville
23. Lucrèce Françoise de La Vieuville
1.Vincent de Bourbon
24. Francesco I d'Este, Duke of Modena
12. Rinaldo d'Este, Duke of Modena
25. Lucrezia Barberini
6. Francesco III d'Este, Duke of Modena
26. John Frederick, Duke of Brunswick-Lüneburg
13. Charlotte Felicity of Brunswick-Lüneburg
27. Benedicta-Henrietta of the Palatinate
3. Princess Maria Teresa Felicitas of Modena
28. Philippe I, Duke of Orléans
14. Philippe II, Duke of Orléans and Regent of France
29. Elizabeth Charlotte of the Palatinate
7. Charlotte Aglaé d'Orléans
30. Louis XIV of France =8
15. Françoise Marie de Bourbon
31. Madame de Montespan =9
