= Duchy of Rambouillet =

The Duchy or Duke of Rambouillet was a French Peerage created in 1711 for Louis Alexandre de Bourbon, Légitimé de France, Count of Toulouse, youngest legitimised son of Louis XIV and Madame de Montespan.

== House of Bourbon ==
=== de facto ===
Picture	Name	Father	Birth	Marriage	Became Duke	Ceased to be Duke	Death	Spouse
	Louis Alexandre de Bourbon, Légitimé de France, Count of Toulouse	Louis XIV (Bourbon)	6 June 1678	2 February 1723	29 July 1711	1 December 1737		Marie Victoire de Noailles
	Louis Jean Marie de Bourbon, Duke of Penthièvre	Louis Alexandre de Bourbon, Count of Toulouse (Bourbon)	16 November 1725	29 December 1744	1 December 1737	4 March 1793		Princess Maria Teresa Felicitas of Modena

== See also ==
- List of French peerages
