= Louis-Alexandre de Bourbon =

Louis-Alexandre de Bourbon may refer to:

- Louis Alexandre de Bourbon, Count of Toulouse (1678–1737), illegitimate son of Louis XIV of France
- Louis Alexandre de Bourbon, Prince of Lamballe (1747–1768), grandson of the above
