= Louis Alexandre =

Louis Alexandre may refer to:

- Louis Alexandre, Prince of Lamballe (1747–1768)
- Louis Alexandre, Count of Toulouse (1678–1737)
