= Louis Marie, Duke of Rambouillet =

French duke; great-grandson of Louis XIV (1746–1749)

Louis
- Duke of Rambouillet
- Born: 2 January 1746; Palace of Versailles, France
- Died: 13 November 1749 (aged 3); Palace of Versailles, France
- Burial: Royal Chapel, Dreux, France
Names
- Louis Marie de Bourbon
- House: House of Bourbon
- Father: Louis Jean Marie de Bourbon, Duke of Penthièvre
- Mother: Princess Maria Teresa d'Este

Louis Marie de Bourbon, Duke of Rambouillet (2 January 1746 – 13 November 1749) was a French nobleman who died before his fourth birthday. He was never in the line of succession to the France's throne because he belonged to the illegitimate Bourbon-Penthièvre branch of the royal dynasty through the liaison of Louis XIV with a maîtresse-en-titre. He was known as the Duc de Rambouillet.

== Biography ==
He was the first born son of Louis de Bourbon, Duc de Penthièvre and his wife, Princess Maria Teresa d'Este. His paternal grandfather, Louis-Alexandre de Bourbon, comte de Toulouse, was one of the many children that Madame de Montespan presented to the Sun King during the latter's marriage to the Queen. He was born at Versailles in the suite once occupied by Mme de Montespan, and later by the Penthièvres from 1744 till 1752. Louis was accorded the title Duke of Rambouillet from birth, a dukedom conferred upon his grandfather Toulouse in 1711.

As a member of a legitimised branch of the royal House of Bourbon, he ranked below the true princes du sang but above the princes étrangers and the ducal peers. Louis' father the Duc de Pentièvre was the greatest landowner in France and had one of the largest fortunes in Europe, having added to his own inheritance the fortune of his paternal uncle Louis-Auguste de Bourbon, duc du Maine.

Louis Marie died at the Versailles at the age of 3. Buried at the chapel at the Château de Rambouillet, he was later moved by his posthumous sister, Louise Marie Adélaïde de Bourbon (wife of the future Philippe Égalité), to the Chapelle royale de Dreux.

== Ancestry ==
Ancestors of Louis Marie, Duke of Rambouillet

16. Louis XIII of France
8. Louis XIV of France
17. Anne of Austria
4. Louis-Alexandre de Bourbon, comte de Toulouse
18. Gabriel de Rochechouart, duc de Mortemart
9. Françoise-Athénaïs de Rochechouart, marquise de Montespan
19. Diane de Grandseigne
2. Louis Jean Marie de Bourbon, duc de Penthièvre
20. Anne de Noailles, duc de Noailles
10. Anne Jules de Noailles, duc de Noailles
21. Louise Boyer
5. Marie Victoire de Noailles
22. Ambroise-François, duc de Bournonville
11. Marie-Françoise de Bournonville
23. Lucrèce Françoise de La Vieuville
1.Louis Marie de Bourbon
24. Francesco I d'Este
12. Rinaldo d'Este, Duke of Modena
25. Lucrezia Barberini
6. Francesco III d'Este, Duke of Modena
26. John Frederick, Duke of Brunswick-Lüneburg
13. Charlotte Felicity of Brunswick
27. Benedicta-Henrietta of the Palatinate
3. Princess Maria Teresa Felicitas of Modena
28. Philippe de France, Duke of Orléans
14. Philippe II, Duke of Orléans
29. Princess Palatine Elisabeth Charlotte
7. Charlotte Aglaé d'Orléans
30. Louis XIV of France =8
15. Françoise-Marie de Bourbon
31. Françoise-Athénaïs de Rochechouart, marquise de Montespan =9
