= Jean-Baptiste Charpentier the Elder =

French painter

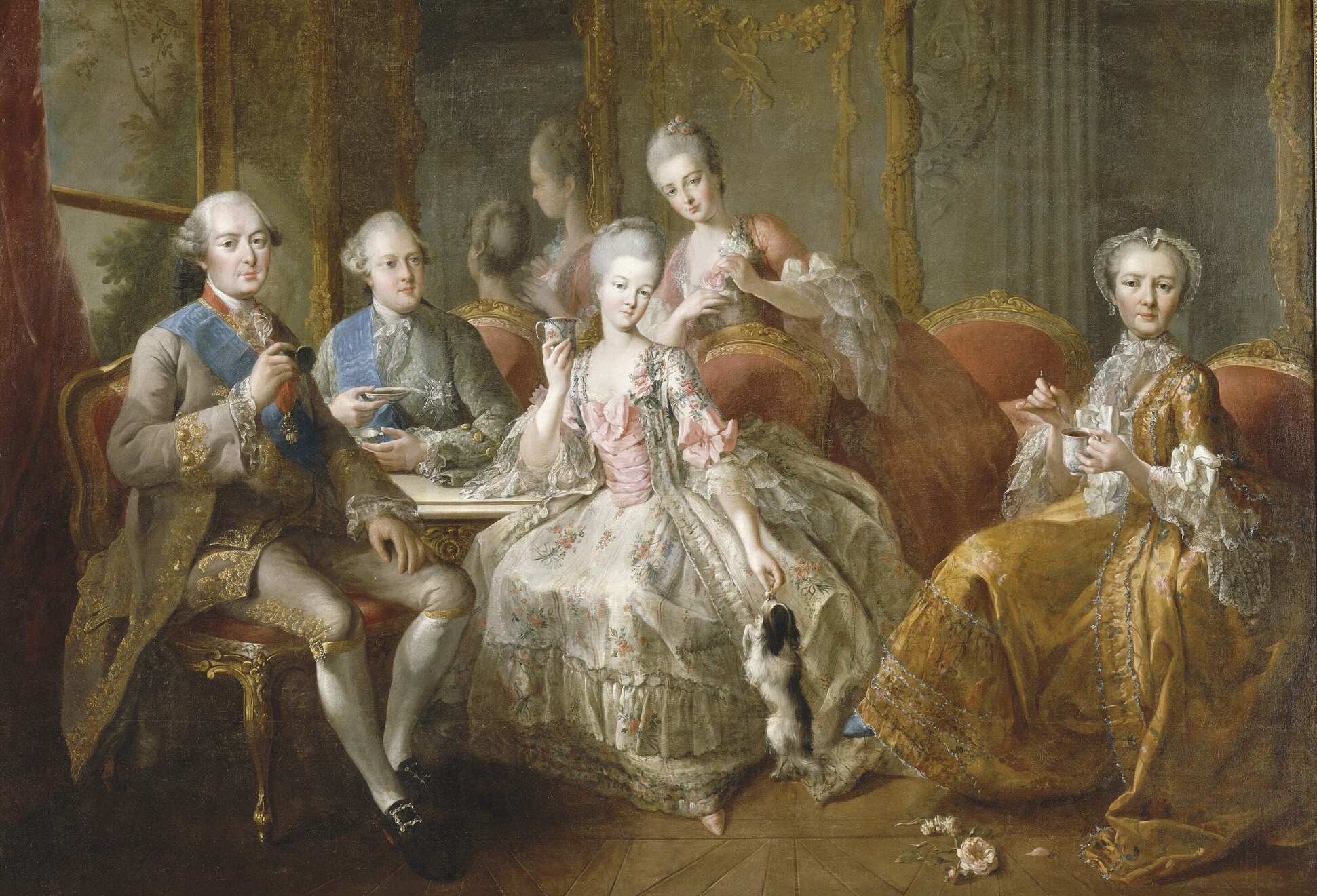
The Family of the Duke of Penthièvre ("The Cup of Chocolate")

Jean-Baptiste Charpentier the Elder (1728, Paris - 3 December 1806, Paris) was a French Rococo portrait painter, associated with the Royal Court. He is best known for portraits of Marie-Antoinette and Louis Jean Marie de Bourbon, Duke of Penthièvre. He also painted members of the Duke's family. His early works were mostly genre scenes.

== Life and work ==
He was probably related to Jean Charpentier (?-1777), a painter and gilder who served as one of the last directors of the Académie de Saint-Luc, an Académie that he attended, beginning in 1760. Later, he became a teacher there. He had wanted to enter the Académie royale de peinture et de sculpture but declined to apply, probably due to obtaining a position with the Penthièvre family. He also found portrait painting to be a more profitable pursuit than genre scenes. For the most part, he had an easy career.

He married Anne-Catherine Le Prince, daughter of the Painter to the King, Jean-Baptiste Le Prince. After the Académie of Saint Luc was suppressed, he continued to exhibit at the Salon de la Correspondance of the Académie royal and became a good friend of Jean-Baptiste Greuze. He exhibited there until 1785. When the French Revolution abolished academic privilege, he switched to the Salon de Louvre and exhibited there from 1791 to 1799. He also returned to his earlier genre work, creating charming scenes from the lives of the common people.
