= Chapelle royale de Dreux =

Chapel located in Eure-et-Loir, France

Royal Chapel of Dreux
- Chapelle royale de Dreux
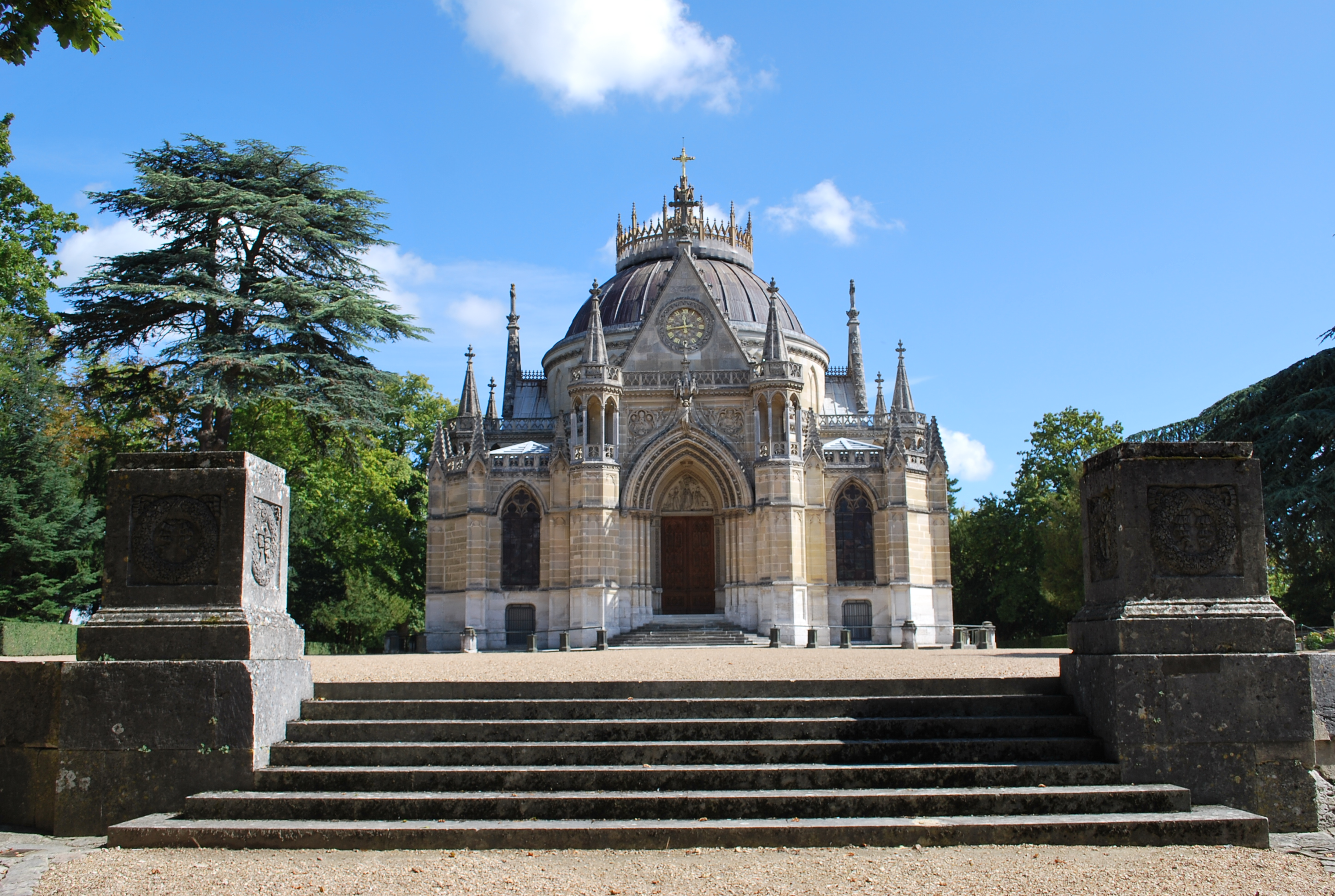
- Interactive map of the Royal Chapel of Dreux area
- Alternative names: Chapelle Saint-Louis de Dreux

General information
- Type: Chapel
- Architectural style: Gothic Revival
- Location: Rue de Penthièvre, Dreux, France
- Coordinates: 48°44′18″N 1°21′48″E
- Construction started: 1816
- Renovated: 1830s
- Owner: Fondation Saint-Louis

Design and construction
- Architects: Claude-Philippe Cramail (original building); Pierre-Bernard Lefranc (renovations)
- Designations: Monument historique

Website
- chapelle-royale-dreux.com

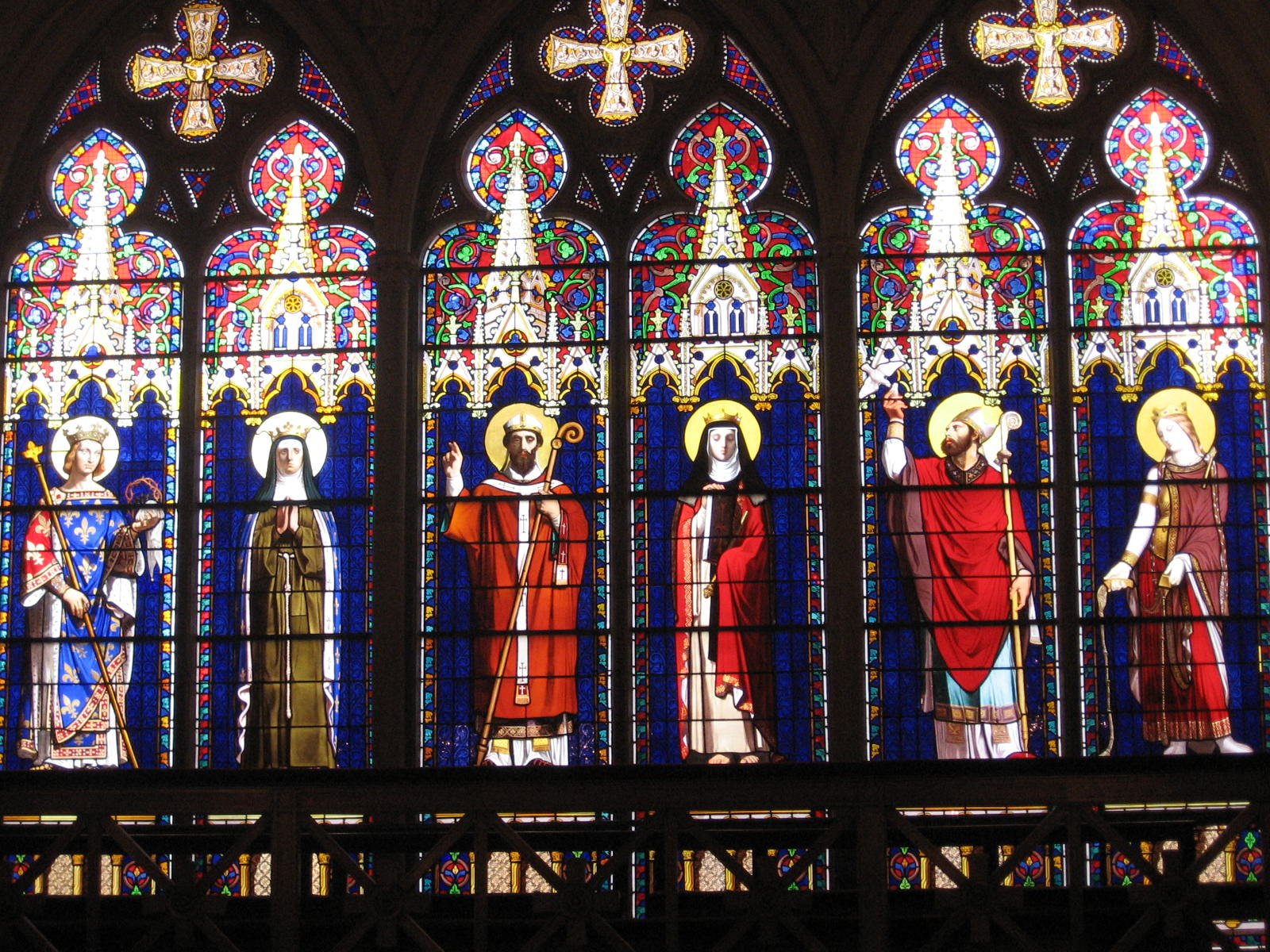
Gothic Revival glass by the Sèvres porcelain manufactory

The Royal Chapel of Dreux (French: Chapelle royale de Dreux) situated in Dreux, France, is the traditional burial place of members of the House of Orléans. It is an important early building in the French adoption of Gothic Revival architecture, despite being topped by a dome. Starting in 1828, Alexandre Brogniart, director of the Sèvres porcelain manufactory, produced fired-enamel paintings on large panes of plate glass for King Louis Philippe I, an important early French commission in Gothic Revival taste, preceded mainly by some Gothic features in a few jardins paysagers.

== Background ==
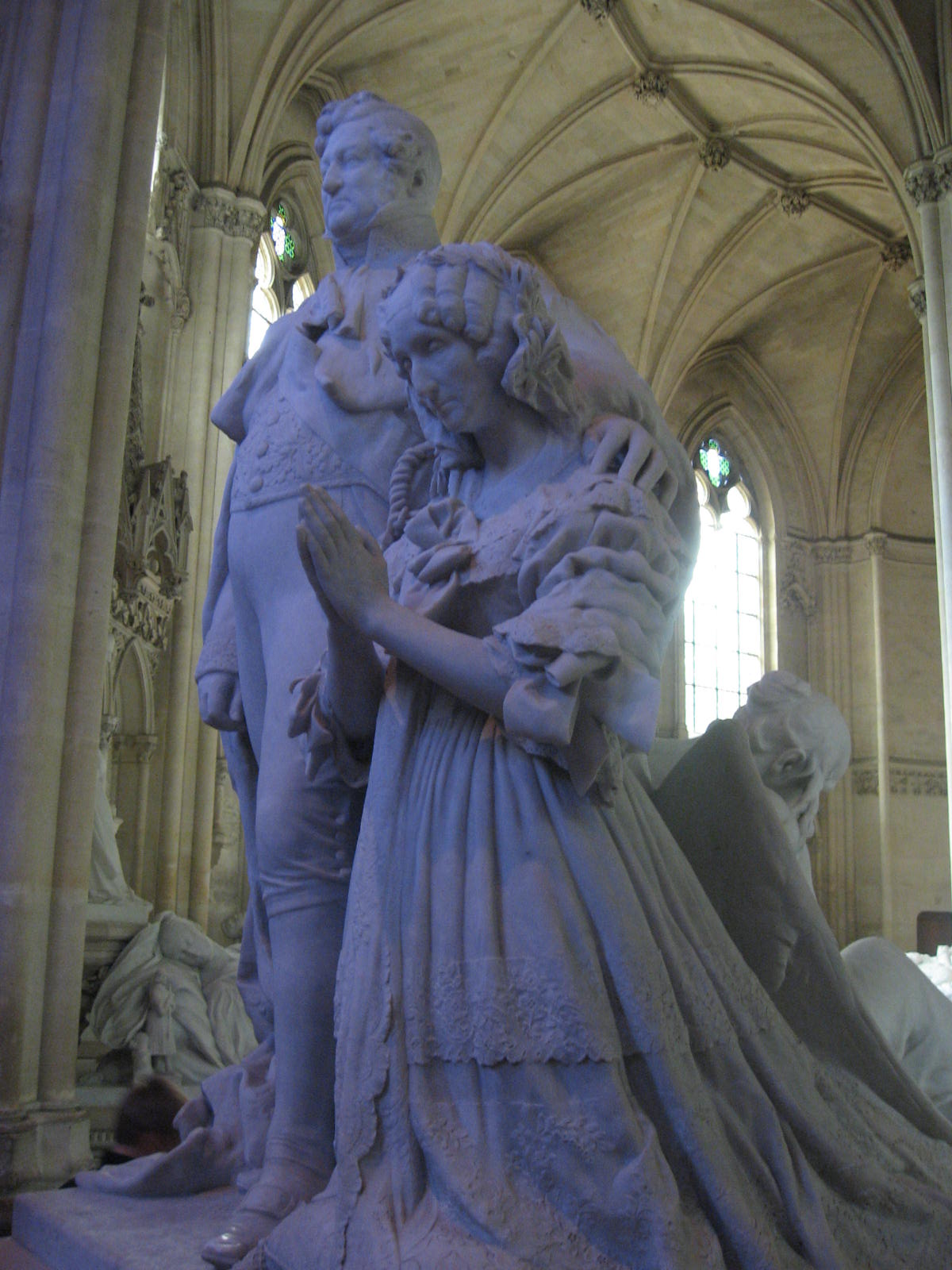
Monument to King Louis-Philippe (1773–1850) and his wife Maria Amalia (1782-1866)

In the 1770s, Louis Jean Marie de Bourbon, Duke of Penthièvre, was one of the greatest land owners in France prior to the French Revolution. In 1775, the lands of the county of Dreux had been given to Penthièvre by his cousin King Louis XVI. In 1783, Penthièvre sold his domain of Rambouillet to Louis XVI. On November 25 of that year, in a long religious procession, Penthièvre transferred the nine caskets containing the remains of his parents (Louis Alexandre, Count of Toulouse, and Marie Victoire de Noailles), his wife (Princess Maria Teresa Felicitas of Modena) and six of their seven children from the small medieval village church next to the castle in Rambouillet to the chapel of the Collégiale Saint-Étienne de Dreux.

Penthièvre died in March 1793, and his body was laid to rest in the crypt beside his parents. On November 21 of that same year, in the midst of the French Revolution, a mob desecrated the crypt and threw the ten bodies into a mass grave in the Chanoines cemetery of the Collégiale Saint-Étienne. In 1816, the Duke of Penthièvre's daughter, the Duchess of Orléans, had a new chapel built on the site of the mass grave of the Chanoines cemetery, as the final resting place for her family. In 1830, Louis Philippe I, King of the French, son of the Duchess of Orléans, embellished and enlarged the chapel which was renamed the Royal Chapel of Dreux, now the necropolis of the Orléans royal family.

In 1977, the domain of the chapel was designated by the French government as a partially protected monument historique (national heritage site).

== List of burials ==
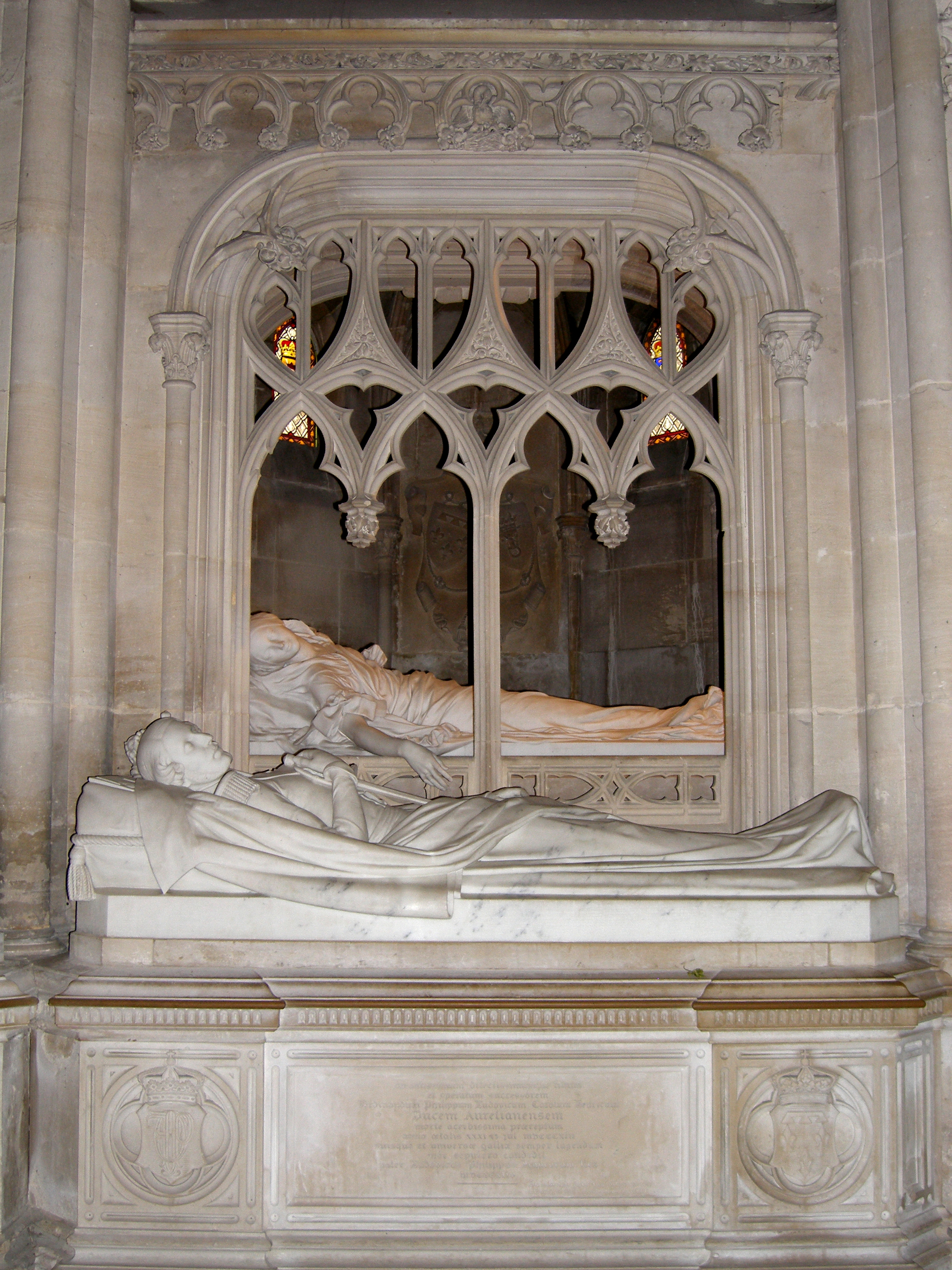
Monuments to Prince Ferdinand Philippe, Duke of Orléans (1810-1842) and his wife Duchess Helen of Mecklenburg-Schwerin (1814-1858)

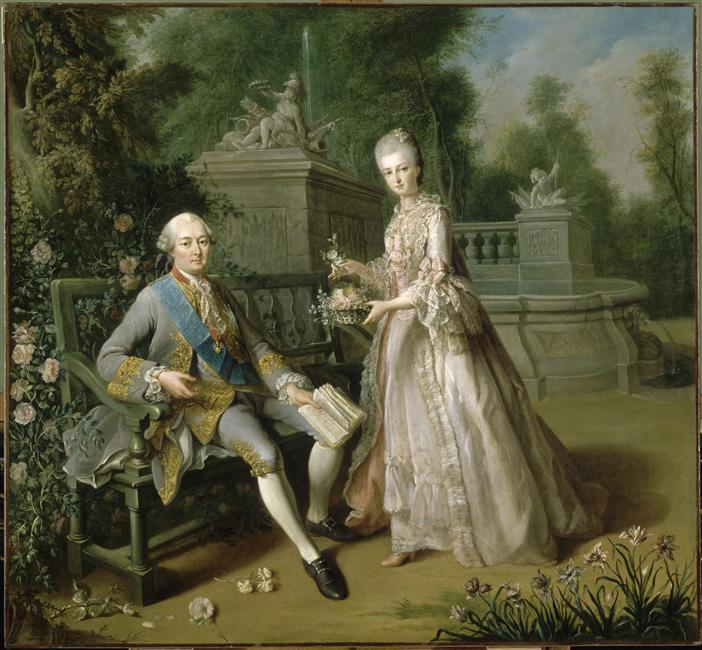
The Duke of Penthièvre with his daughter the future Duchess of Orléans in circa 1768 by Jean Baptiste Charpentier le Vieux

Among the seventy-five people buried in the new chapel are:

1. Louis Alexandre, Count of Toulouse (1678–1737)
2. Marie Victoire de Noailles (1688-1766) wife of the above.
3. Louis Jean Marie de Bourbon, Duke of Penthièvre (1725-1793)
4. Princess Maria Teresa Felicitas of Modena (1726-1754) wife of the above.
5. Louis Marie, Duke of Rambouillet (1746-1749).
6. Louis Alexandre, Prince of Lamballe (1747-1768).
7. Jean Marie, Duke of Châteauvillain (1748–1755).
8. Vincent Marie Louis de Bourbon (1750–1752).
9. Marie Louise de Bourbon (1751–1753).
10. Louise Marie Adélaïde de Bourbon (1753–1821).
11. Louis Marie Félicité de Bourbon (1754).
12. Louis François Joseph, Prince of Conti (1734–1814)
13. the heart of Philippe d'Orléans, Duke of Orléans, Regent of France for Louis XV (1674–1723).
14. Louis Philippe I, King of the French (1773–1850).
15. Princess Maria Amalia of the Two Sicilies (1782–1866), wife of the above.
16. Antoine Philippe, Duke of Montpensier (1775–1807) (cenotaph).
17. Princess Adélaïde d'Orléans (1777–1847).
18. Françoise d'Orléans Mademoiselle d'Orléans (1777–1782).
19. Louis Charles, Count of Beaujolais (1779–1808).
20. Prince Ferdinand Philippe, Duke of Orléans (1810–1842).
21. Duchess Helen of Mecklenburg-Schwerin (1814–1858), wife of the above.
22. Princess Marie of Orléans (1813–1839)
23. Prince Louis, Duke of Nemours (1814–1896)
24. Princess Victoria of Saxe-Coburg and Gotha (1822–1857), wife of the above.
25. Prince Ferdinand, Duke of Alençon (1844–1910)
26. Duchess Sophie Charlotte in Bavaria (1847–1897).
27. François d'Orléans, Prince of Joinville (1818–1900)
28. Princess Francisca of Brazil (1824–1898), wife of the above.
29. Charles, Duke of Penthièvre (1820–1828).
30. Prince Henri, Duke of Aumale (1822–1897)
31. Princess Maria Carolina of the Two Sicilies (1822–1869), wife of the above.
32. Archduchess Clementina of Austria (1798–1881), mother of the above.
33. Prince Philippe, Count of Paris (1838–1894)
34. Princess Marie Isabelle of Orléans (1848–1919), wife of the above.
35. Prince Robert, Duke of Chartres (1840–1910)
36. Princess Françoise of Orléans (1844–1925), wife of the above.
37. Pierre, Duke of Penthièvre (1845–1919).
38. Louis, Prince of Condé (1845–1866).
39. Léopold Philippe, Duke of Guise (1847–1847).
40. François Paul d'Orléans, Duke of Guise (1852–1852).
41. François Louis, Duke of Guise (1854–1872).
42. Prince Henri of Orléans (1867–1901)
43. Prince Philippe, Duke of Orléans (1869–1926)
44. Prince Ferdinand, Duke of Montpensier (1884–1924)
45. Prince Emmanuel, Duke of Vendôme (1872–1931)
46. Princess Henriette of Belgium (1870–1948), wife of the above.
47. Prince Charles Philippe, Duke of Nemours (1905–1970), son of the above.
48. Marguerite Watson (1899–1993), wife of the above.
49. Princess Sophie of Orléans (1898–1928)
50. Prince Antônio Gastão of Orléans-Braganza (1881–1918), Prince of Brazil.
51. Prince Luís of Orléans-Braganza (1878–1920), Prince Imperial of Brazil.
52. Princess Maria di Grazia of Bourbon-Two Sicilies (1878–1973), wife of the above.
53. Prince Luiz Gastão of Orléans-Braganza (1911–1931)
54. Prince Jean, Duke of Guise (1874–1940)
55. Princess Isabelle of Orléans (1878–1961), wife of the above.
56. Prince Henri, Count of Paris (1908–1999), Orléanist pretender.
57. Princess Isabelle of Orléans and Braganza (1911–2003), wife of the above.
58. Prince François Gaston, Duke of Orléans, son of the above (1935–1960).
59. Prince Thibaut, Count of La Marche, brother of the above (1948–1983).
60. Bathilde d'Orléans (1750–1822).
61. Prince François, Count of Clermont (1961–2017).
62. Prince Henri, Count of Paris (1933–2019), Orléanist pretender.

== See also ==
- List of works by James Pradier
