= Louis Jean Marie de Bourbon, Duke of Penthièvre =

French duke; grandson of Louis XIV (1725–1793)

Louis Jean Marie de Bourbon
- Duke of Penthièvre
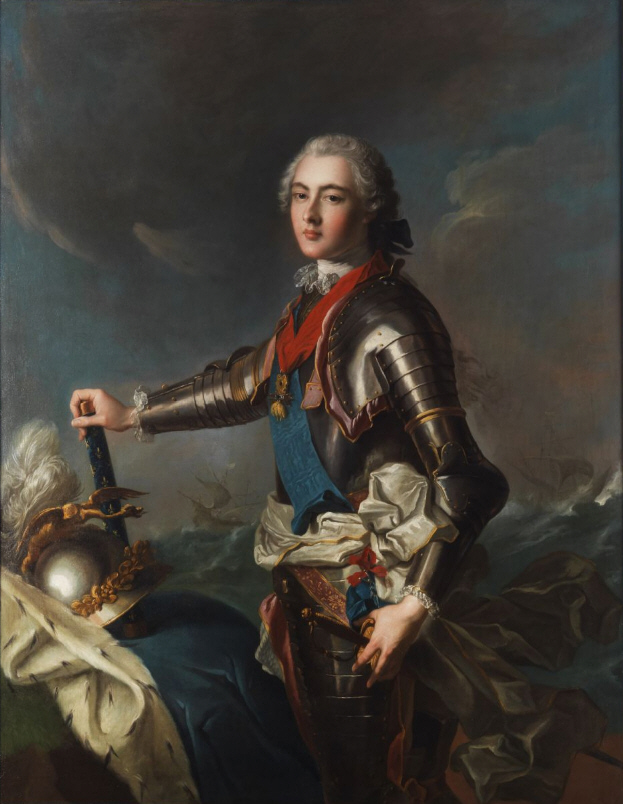
- Portrait by Jean-Marc Nattier
- Born: 16 November 1725; Château de Rambouillet, France
- Died: 4 March 1793 (aged 67); Château de Bizy, Vernon, France
- Burial: Chapelle royale de Dreux
- Spouse: Princess Maria Teresa d'Este (m. 1744; died 1754)
- Issue Detail: Louis Marie, Duke of Rambouillet; Louis Alexandre, Prince of Lamballe; Jean Marie, Duke of Châteauvillain; Vincent, Count of Guingamp; Marie Adélaide, Duchess of Orléans
Names
- Louis Jean Marie de Bourbon
- House: Bourbon-Penthièvre
- Father: Louis Alexandre de Bourbon
- Mother: Marie Victoire de Noailles

Louis Jean Marie de Bourbon (16 November 1725 - 4 March 1793) was the son of Louis Alexandre de Bourbon and his wife Marie Victoire de Noailles. He was therefore a grandson of Louis XIV and his mistress, Madame de Montespan. From birth he was known as the Duke of Penthièvre. He also possessed the following titles: Prince of Lamballe (given later as a courtesy title to the duke's only surviving son); Prince of Carignano; Duke of Rambouillet; Duke of Aumale (1775); Duke of Gisors; Duke of Châteauvillain; Duke of Arc-en-Barrois; Duke of Amboise; Count of Eu; Count of Guingamp. He was the father in law of Philippe Égalité.

== Life ==
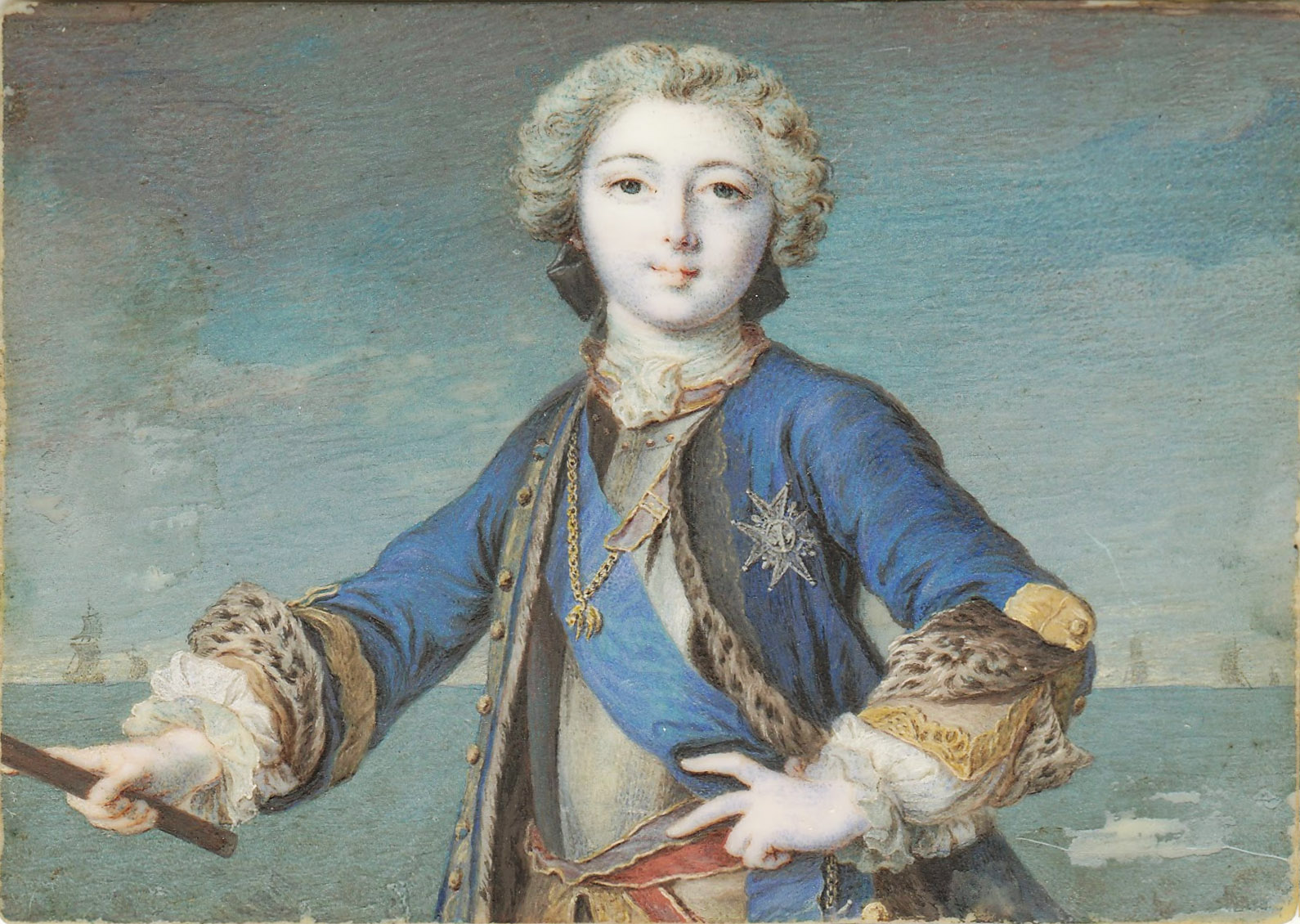
Louis Jean Marie as a child, by Jean-Marc Nattier .

Louis Jean Marie de Bourbon was born at the Château de Rambouillet, the son of Louis XIV's youngest legitimised son with Madame de Montespan, the Count of Toulouse, and his wife, Marie Victoire de Noailles, one of the daughters of Anne Jules de Noailles, Duke of Noailles. Since his mother acted as a surrogate parent to the young, orphaned Louis XV, the duke formed a close relationship with the young monarch, who was his godfather.

At the age of twelve, upon his father's death, he succeeded to his father's military posts and titles:

- Admiral of France
- Grand Master of France
- Grand Huntsman of France
- Marshal of France
- Governor of Brittany

On 2 July 1733 at the age of eight, he was made a maréchal de camp (field marshal) and the next year, a lieutenant général (lieutenant general). In 1740, he received the Ordre de la Toison d'or from his Bourbon cousin, the King of Spain. In 1742, King Louis XV conferred upon him the Order of the Holy Spirit. He served in the military under his maternal uncle, the maréchal-duc de Noailles, and fought brilliantly at Dettingen in 1743 and Fontenoy in 1745.

As the possessor of one of the largest fortunes in Europe, Louis Jean Marie was an enticing marriage candidate, especially considering his close links with the French royal family.

A suggestion was made that he would marry his cousin, Louise Henriette de Bourbon, the eldest granddaughter of his paternal aunt, Louise-Françoise de Bourbon. This idea, however, was abandoned as Louise Henriette's mother wished her daughter to marry Louis Philippe d'Orléans, the heir of the House of Orléans.

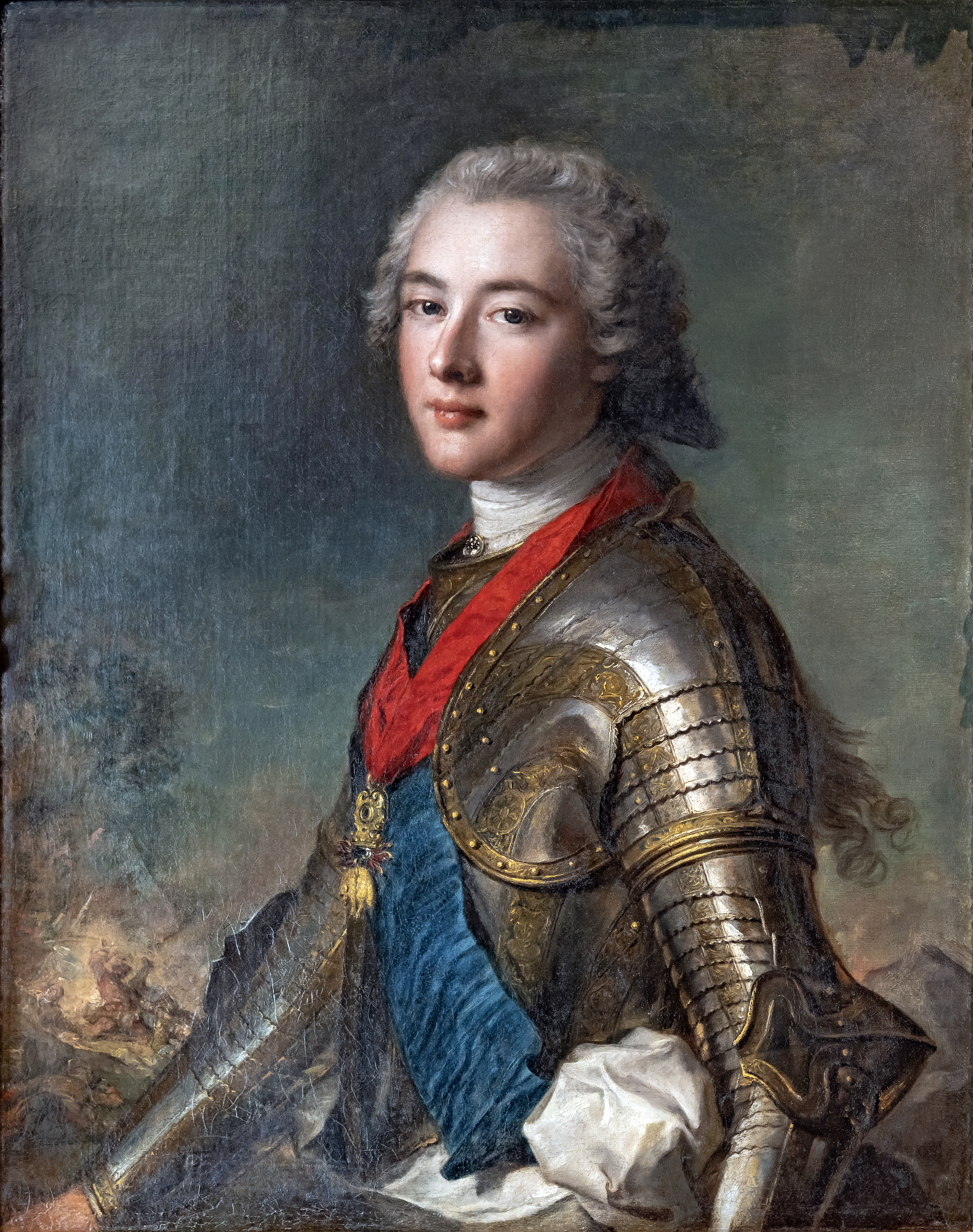
Portrait of the Duke, by Jean-Marc Nattier, c. 1742-53

In 1744, at the age of nineteen, Penthièvre married Princess Maria Teresa d'Este (1726-1754), the daughter of Francesco III d'Este, the sovereign Duke of Modena and Reggio, and his first cousin, Charlotte Aglaé d'Orléans. The young couple occupied a suite of apartments at Versailles, which had previously been occupied by their joint ancestor Madame de Montespan. These apartments were used by the duke and his family until the reign of Louis XVI when the space was given to Mesdames, the new king's spinster aunts, Louis XV's unmarried daughters.

The couple had seven children, only two of whom survived infancy:

- Louis Marie de Bourbon, duc de Rambouillet (Palace of Versailles, 2 January 1746 – Palace of Versailles, 13 November 1749).
- Louis Alexandre Joseph Stanislas de Bourbon, prince de Lamballe (Hôtel de Toulouse, Paris, 6 September 1747 – Château de Louveciennes, 6 May 1768), married Princess Marie Louise of Savoy and had no issue.
- Jean Marie de Bourbon, duc de Châteauvillain (Hôtel de Toulouse, Paris, 17 July 1748 – Hôtel de Toulouse, Paris, 19 May 1755).
- Vincent Marie Louis de Bourbon, comte de Guingamp (Hôtel de Toulouse, Paris, 22 June 1750 – Palace of Versailles, 14 March 1752).
- Marie Louise de Bourbon, Mademoiselle de Penthièvre (Hôtel de Toulouse, Paris, 18 October 1751 – Palace of Versailles, 26 September 1753).
- Louise Marie Adélaïde de Bourbon, Mademoiselle d'Ivoy and later Mademoiselle de Penthièvre (Hôtel de Toulouse, Paris, 13 March 1753 – Château d'Ivry-sur-Seine, 23 June 1821), married Philippe d'Orléans and had issue.
- Louis Marie Félicité de Bourbon (Château de Rambouillet, 29 April 1754 – Château de Rambouillet, 30 April 1754).

The Duchess of Penthièvre died in childbirth in 1754, at the age of 27, her last child surviving her only a few hours. His mother-in-law tried to arrange a marriage between the duke and Maria Theresa Felicitas's younger sister Matilde. Inconsolable at the loss of his loved wife, the grieving duke declined the offer and never married again.

After his wife's death, the duke lived increasingly away from the court at Versailles, dividing his time between two of his many country residences, the Château de Rambouillet and the Château de Sceaux. He devoted the majority of the rest of his life to dispensing charity. During the French Revolution, he gave refuge in Sceaux to the poet Jean Pierre Claris de Florian, who had formerly been one of his pages and his secretary at the Château d'Anet and the Hôtel de Toulouse (seat of the Banque de France since 1811) in Paris.

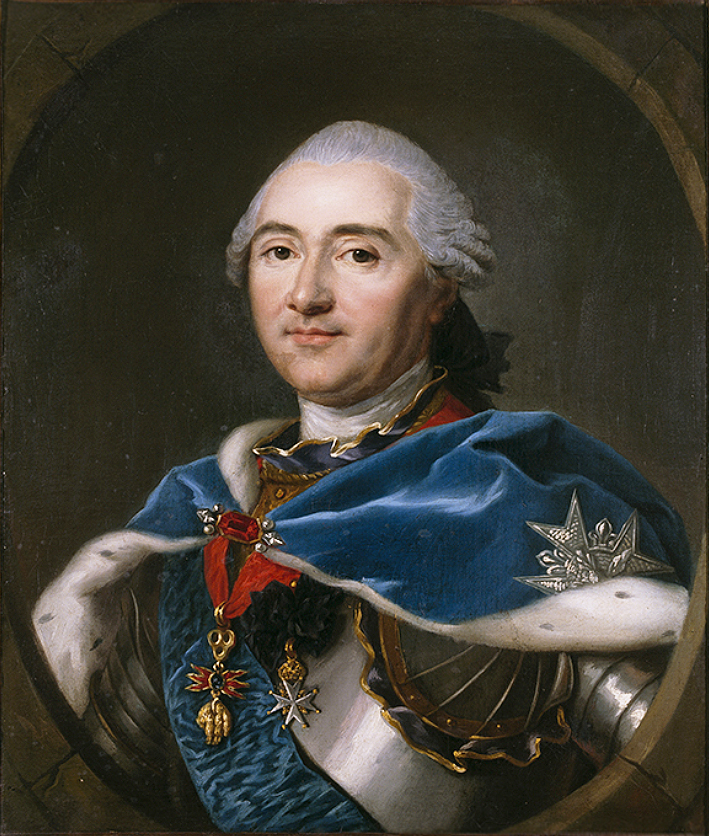
The Duke of Penthièvre, by Charles-André van Loo, 18th century

In 1791, he moved to the Château de Bizy, at Vernon in Normandy, where his daughter joined him in April of that year after leaving her husband, the Duke of Orléans (Philippe Égalité during the French Revolution). Respected by the people because of his philanthropy, the duke was never bothered by the radicals as the French Revolution progressed. Others of his immediate family, however, were not spared. On 3 September 1792, his daughter-in-law, the princesse de Lamballe, was savagely murdered, and on 21 January 1793, his cousin Louis XVI was executed. He never saw the arrest of his daughter in April 1793, as he died on 4 March 1793 at Bizy. On the night of 6 to 7 March, his body was brought clandestinely to Dreux, where it was buried in the family crypt at the Collégiale Saint-Étienne. Nine months later, on the afternoon of 21 November 1793 a group of Jacobin radicals and their workmen broke into the chapel, with the excuse of searching for lead and destroying feudal symbols, which had recently been outlawed. They smashed the armorial decorations, uprooted the coffins, and treated the remains of the royally-connected Penthievre family to a common pauper's burial, in a quicklime-coated pit in the nearby canons' cemetery. Similar treatment had recently been given to the remains of the duc's executed cousin King Louis XVI in Paris, and to their ancestors at the royal necropolis of St.Denis. The raid had yielded 1,252 pounds of lead for reuse as ammunition "to fire at the enemies of the Revolution". In 1798 the remains of the chapel were put up for auction, and demolished as recyclable building materials by the successful bidder, a timber merchant from Chartres.

During his lifetime, the duc de Penthièvre had one passion, that of collecting watches.

== Legacy ==
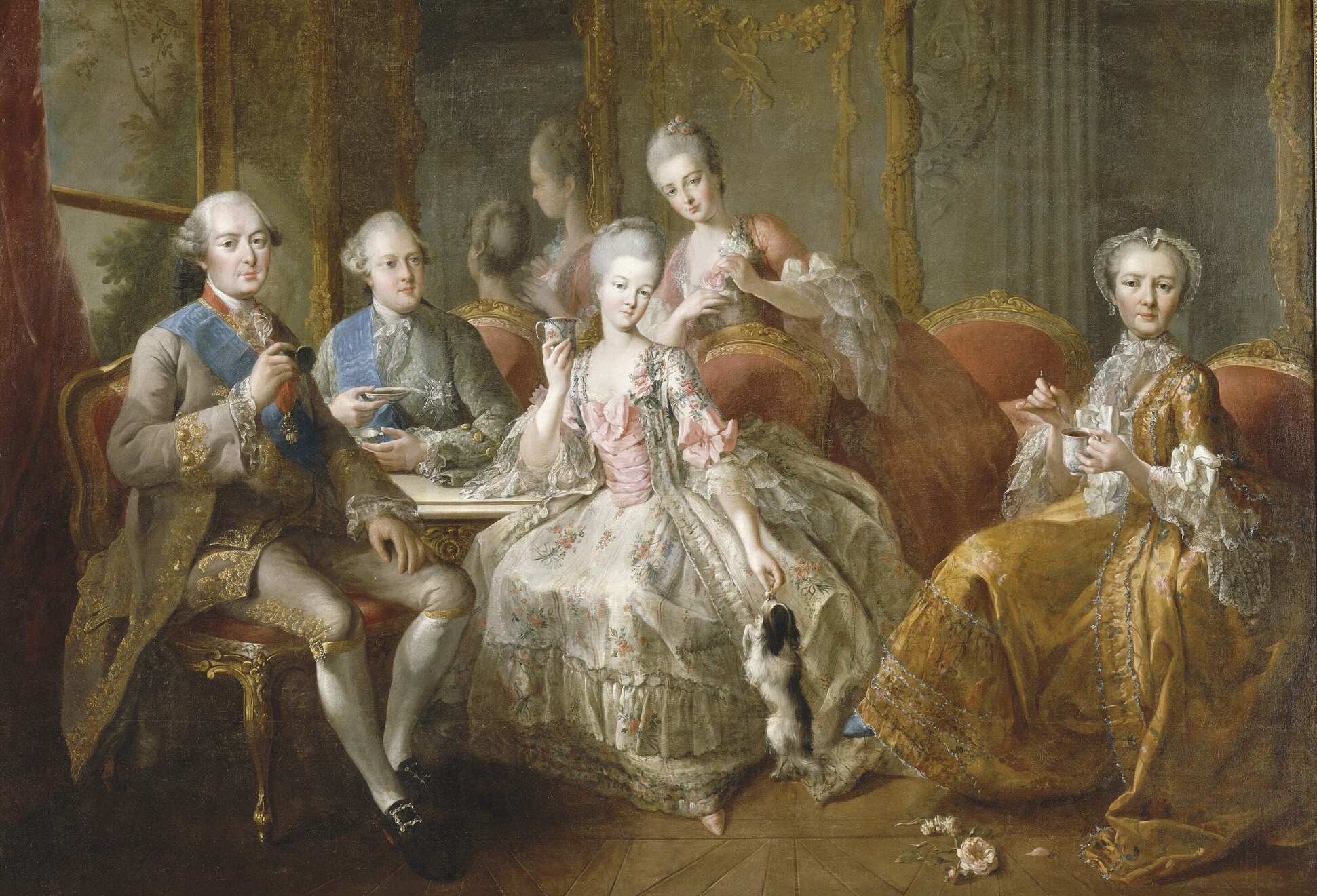
The Family of the Duke of Penthièvre called la tasse de chocolat, by Jean-Baptiste Charpentier, c. 1768

Penthièvre was one of the wealthiest men of his day and probably the richest in France. He was known to be very charitable. Most of his vast riches derived from the fortune of La Grande Mademoiselle, the first cousin of King Louis XIV.

In 1681, Louis XIV had given his consent that his cousin marry the duc de Lauzun, the only man she ever loved, on the condition she make the Duke of Maine, the newly legitimised son of the king and Mme de Montespan, her heir. All she could be made to accept, against her will, was to give the young duke the county of Eu and the principality of Dombes. Upon which, untrue to his word, Louis XIV refused to let her marry Lauzun.

Du Maine's fortune was enlarged with many expensive gifts from his adoring father. His two sons inherited his fortune and when they both died childless, the duc de Penthièvre was the sole heir to du Maine's wealth. The châteaux at Sceaux, Anet, Aumale, Dreux and Gisors were part of this huge inheritance.

In addition, being his only child, the duc de Penthièvre was the only heir of the comte de Toulouse from whom he inherited the Hôtel de Toulouse in Paris, and the château de Rambouillet surrounded by the game-rich Rambouillet forest. The Hôtel de Toulouse was the family's residence in Paris. The duc de Penthièvre willed it to his daughter, Louise Marie Adélaïde de Bourbon. It was located opposite the Palais-Royal.

Over the years, the duc de Penthièvre also acquired other estates:

- Château de Chanteloup, a vast château situated in the Touraine province of France. He received this after the death of the duc de Choiseul, in 1785.
- Château d'Amboise, a castle in the Loire Valley
- Château at Châteauneuf-sur-Loire
- Château de La Ferté-Vidame, this château was home to the sharp-penned memorialist, Saint-Simon, who had especially loathed the duc de Penthièvre's father and uncle.

Because his male heir, the prince de Lamballe, predeceased him in 1768, his only surviving child, his daughter, became the sole heir to his fortune. In 1769, she had married the Duke of Chartres, future duc d'Orléans, known to history as Philippe Égalité. As a result, what she managed (after the Bourbon Restoration) to recuperate of her fortune confiscated during the French Revolution, passed, upon her death in 1821, into the possession of the House of Orléans.

The lands of the Comté de Dreux (County of Dreux), had been given to the duc de Penthièvre by his cousin Louis XVI. In November 1783, after having sold to Louis XVI the château de Rambouillet and the immense rich-game forest attached to the estate - the latter being the main reason of the sale - Penthièvre transferred the nine bodies of his family (his parents, his wife and six of his seven children) from the 12th century Saint-Lubin church in the village of Rambouillet to the Collégiale Saint-Étienne de Dreux, where he himself was buried in March 1793. In November 1793, a revolutionary mob desecrated the family crypt and threw the ten bodies in a mass grave in the Collégiale cemetery (cimetière des Chanoines). In 1816, his daughter, Louise Marie Adélaïde de Bourbon, duchesse douairière d'Orléans, had a new chapel built on the site of that grave, as the final resting place for the members of the House of Bourbon-Toulouse-Penthièvre. After the accession to the throne of her son, Louis-Philippe, King of the French, the chapel was named Chapelle royale de Dreux, and became the necropolis of the royal Orléans family. It contains the remains of 75 members of the Bourbon and Orléans families.

A street in Paris near the Avenue des Champs Élysées is named for the duc de Penthièvre. At the site of n° 11 rue de Penthièvre, an hôtel particulier of the First French Empire period with a large garden, is believed to have once been the residence of the duc de Penthièvre's grandson, the future King of the French, Louis-Philippe, in his youth. In the late 19th century, n° 11 housed the American Embassy. This address became famous in the early 20th century as the salon de couture of the British designer, "Lucile".

== Ancestry ==
Ancestors of Louis Jean Marie de Bourbon, Duke of Penthièvre

8. Louis XIII of France
4. Louis XIV of France
9. Anne of Austria
2. Louis Alexandre, Count of Toulouse
10. Gabriel de Rochechouart, duc de Mortemart
5. Madame de Montespan
11. Diane de Grandseigne
1. Louis Jean Marie de Bourbon
12. Anne, duc de Noailles
6. Anne Jules, duc de Noailles
13. Louise Boyer
3. Marie Victoire de Noailles
14. Ambroise-François, duc de Bournonville
7. Marie-Françoise de Bournonville
15. Lucrèce Françoise de La Vieuville

Louis Jean Marie de Bourbon, Duke of Penthièvre House of Bourbon Cadet branch of the Capetian dynasty Born: 16 November 1725 Died: 4 March 1793
French nobility
Preceded by Louis Charles de Bourbon	Count of Eu; 1775–1793	Succeeded by Louise Marie Adélaïde de Bourbon with Philippe d'Orléans
New title	Count of Guingamp: –1793	Succeeded by Vincent Marie Louis de Bourbon
Preceded by Louis-Alexandre de Bourbon, Count of Toulouse	Count of Toulouse; 1737–1793	Succeeded by House of Orléans
Preceded by Louis-Alexandre de Bourbon, Count of Toulouse	Duke of Penthièvre; 1725–1793	Succeeded by House of Orléans
Preceded by Louis-Alexandre de Bourbon, Count of Toulouse	Duke of Châteauvillain; 1737–1748	Succeeded by Jean Marie de Bourbon
Preceded by Louis-Alexandre de Bourbon, Count of Toulouse	Duke of Damville; 1737–1793	Succeeded by House of Orléans
Preceded by Louis-Alexandre de Bourbon, Count of Toulouse	Duke of Rambouillet; 1737–1776	Succeeded by House of Orléans
Preceded by Choiseul family	Duke of Amboise; 1786–1793	Extinct
New title	Duke of Gisors; 1775–1793	Succeeded by House of Orléans
New title	Duke of Arc; 1737–1793	Extinct
New title	Prince of Lamballe -–1747	Succeeded by Louis Alexandre Stanislas de Bourbon
Italian royalty
Preceded by Charles Emmanuel III of Sardinia, Duke of Savoy	Prince of Carignano; 1751–1793	Succeeded by Louise Marie Adélaïde de Bourbon
Political offices
Preceded by Louis-Alexandre de Bourbon, Count of Toulouse	Minister of the Navy; 1737–1793	Succeeded by Revolution
Preceded by Louis-Alexandre de Bourbon, Count of Toulouse	Admiral of France; 1737–1793	Succeeded by Revolution
