= Maria Teresa Felicitas d'Este =

Duchess of Penthièvre (1726–1754)

Maria Teresa d'Este
- Duchess of Penthièvre
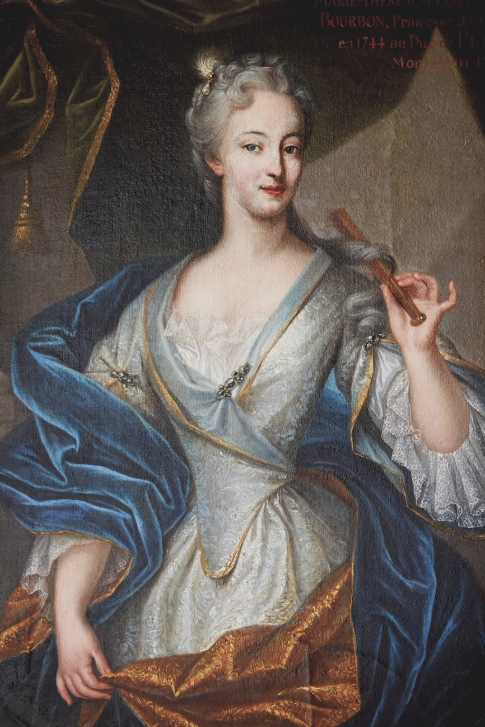
- Born: 6 October 1726; Ducal Palace, Modena
- Died: 30 April 1754 (aged 27); Château de Rambouillet, France
- Burial: Chapelle royale de Dreux
- Spouse: Louis Jean Marie de Bourbon, Duke of Penthièvre (m. 1744)
- Issue Detail: Louis Marie, Duke of Rambouillet; Louis Alexandre, Prince of Lamballe; Jean Marie, Duke of Châteauvillain; Vincent, Count of Guingamp; Marie Adélaide, Duchess of Orléans
Names
- Maria Teresa Felicitas d'Este
- House: Este
- Father: Francesco III d'Este, Duke of Modena
- Mother: Charlotte Aglaé d'Orléans

Maria Teresa Felicitas d'Este (French: Marie Thérèse Félicité; 6 October 1726 – 30 April 1754) was a Princess of Modena by birth and Duchess of Penthièvre by marriage. She was the mother-in-law of Philippe Égalité and thus grandmother to the future Louis Philippe I, King of the French.

== Youth (1726–1744) ==
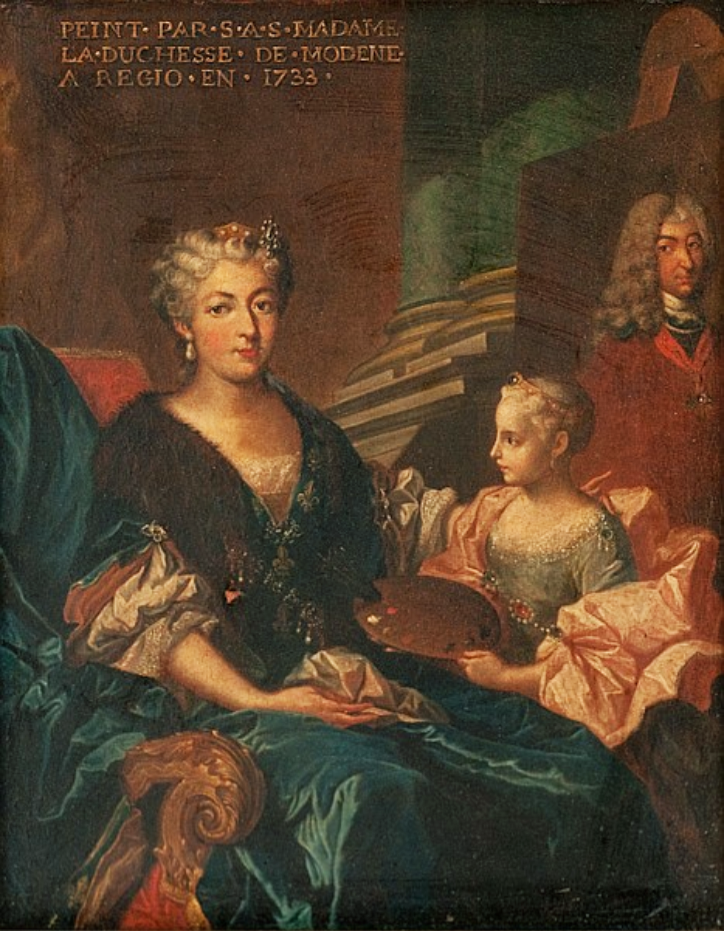
The Duchess of Modena with Maria Teresa, by Nicolas de Largillière

Maria Teresa Felicitas was born on 6 October 1726 at the Ducal Palace of Modena in Modena, Italy. She was the eldest daughter of Francesco III, Duke of Modena and Charlotte Aglaé d'Orléans. Before her birth, her parents had two sons, Alfonso and Francesco, both of whom died in 1725.

Her parents' marriage was not happy and her mother eventually returned to her native France. The Duchess took up residence in the Luxembourg Palace in Paris, with the permission of Louis XV. It was while her mother was in France that she saw the opportunity to marry her daughters into the royal family; such alliances between princes du sang and princesses from a small Italian duchy was highly unexpected. Maria Teresa was engaged to her second cousin, Louis Jean Marie de Bourbon, Duke of Penthièvre. Her younger sister, Maria Fortunata, would also become a member of the French royal family in 1759 through her marriage to another cousin, Louis François Joseph, Prince of Conti.

== Marriage and death (1744–1754) ==
The Duke of Penthièvre was Maria Teresa's mother's first cousin. Charlotte Aglaé's mother was the sister of the duke's father, Louis Alexandre, Count of Toulouse. The wedding took place on December 29, 1744 in Modena, followed by another ceremony at the Palace of Versailles. The Duke had inherited a great fortune when his father died in 1737. According to some contemporaries, their marriage was a very happy one.

The couple's happiness would come to an abrupt end with the death of Maria Teresa on April 30, 1754, a day after giving birth to their seventh child, Louis Marie Félicité, who also died shortly after. After her death, her mother tried to arrange a marriage between her widower and her younger sister, Princess Matilde. However, the grieving duke declined the offer and never remarried.

=== Issue ===
Maria Teresa and her husband had seven children, but only two survived infancy:

- Louis Marie, Duke of Rambouillet (Palace of Versailles, 2 January 1746 – Palace of Versailles, 13 November 1749), died in infancy.
- Louis Alexandre, Prince of Lamballe (Hôtel de Toulouse, Paris, 6 September 1747 – Château de Louveciennes, 6 May 1768), married Princess Marie Louise of Savoy and had no issue.
- Jean Marie, Duke of Châteauvillain (Hôtel de Toulouse, Paris, 17 July 1748 – Hôtel de Toulouse, Paris, 19 May 1755), died in infancy.
- Vincent, Count of Guingamp (Hôtel de Toulouse, Paris, 22 June 1750 – Palace of Versailles, 14 March 1752), died in infancy.
- Marie Louise, Mademoiselle de Penthièvre (Hôtel de Toulouse, Paris, 18 October 1751 – Palace of Versailles, 26 September 1753), died in infancy.
- Louise Marie Adélaïde (Hôtel de Toulouse, Paris, 13 March 1753 – Château d'Ivry-sur-Seine, 23 June 1821), Mademoiselle d'Ivoy and later Mademoiselle de Penthièvre. Married Philippe d'Orléans and had issue.
- Louis Marie Félicité (Château de Rambouillet, 29 April 1754 – Château de Rambouillet, 30 April 1754), died a day after his birth.

== Gallery ==
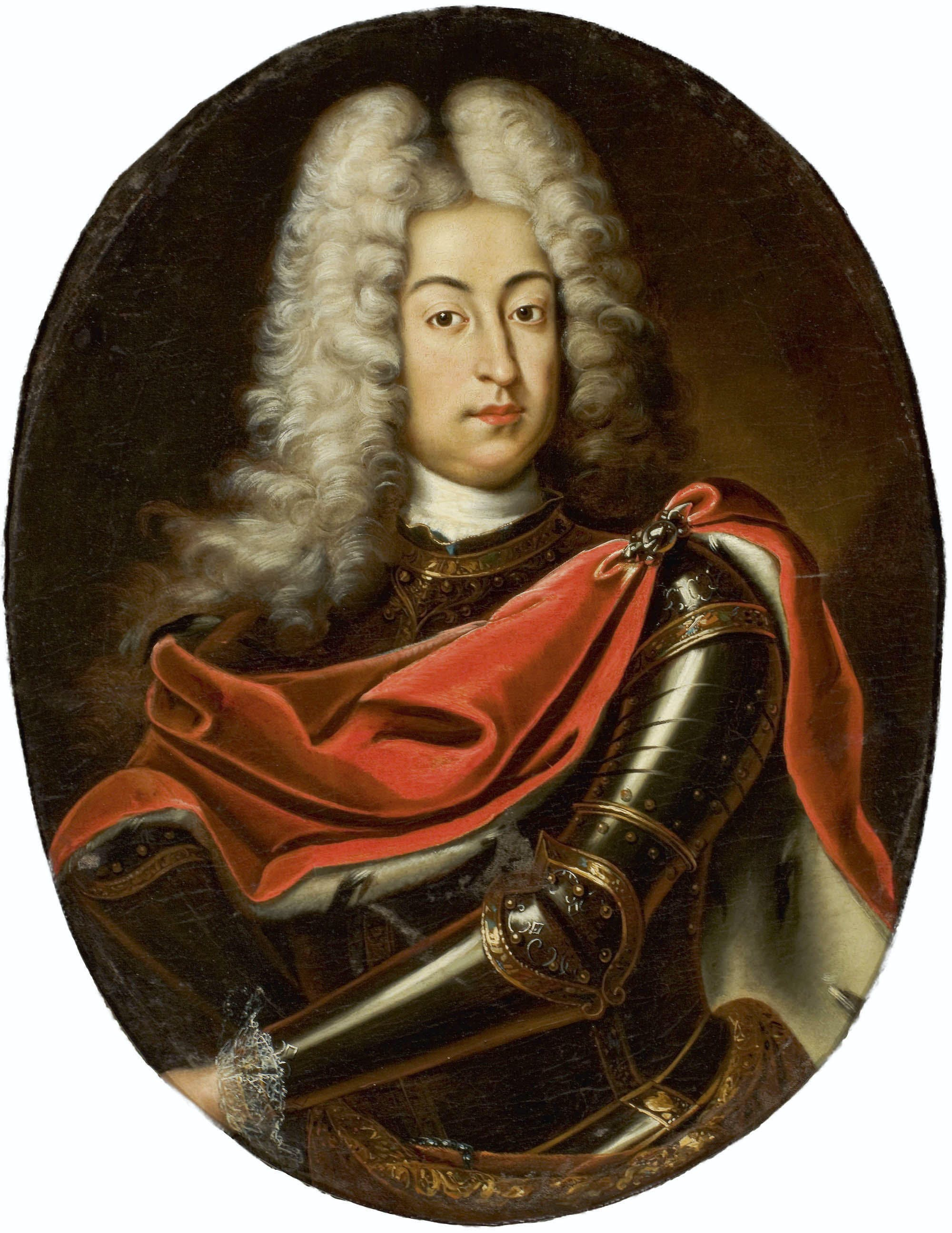
Francesco III d'Este, Duke of Modena

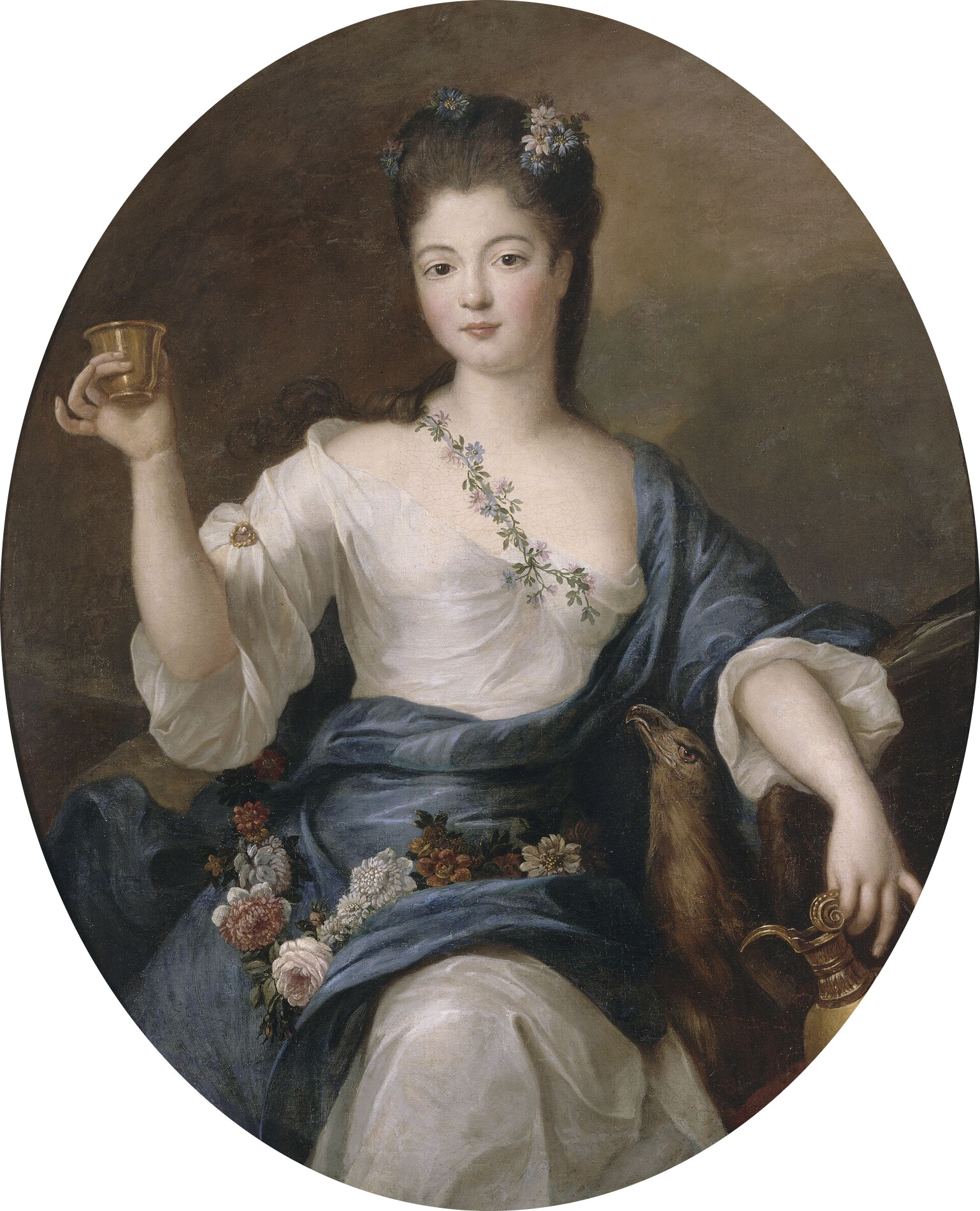
Charlotte Aglaé of Orléans

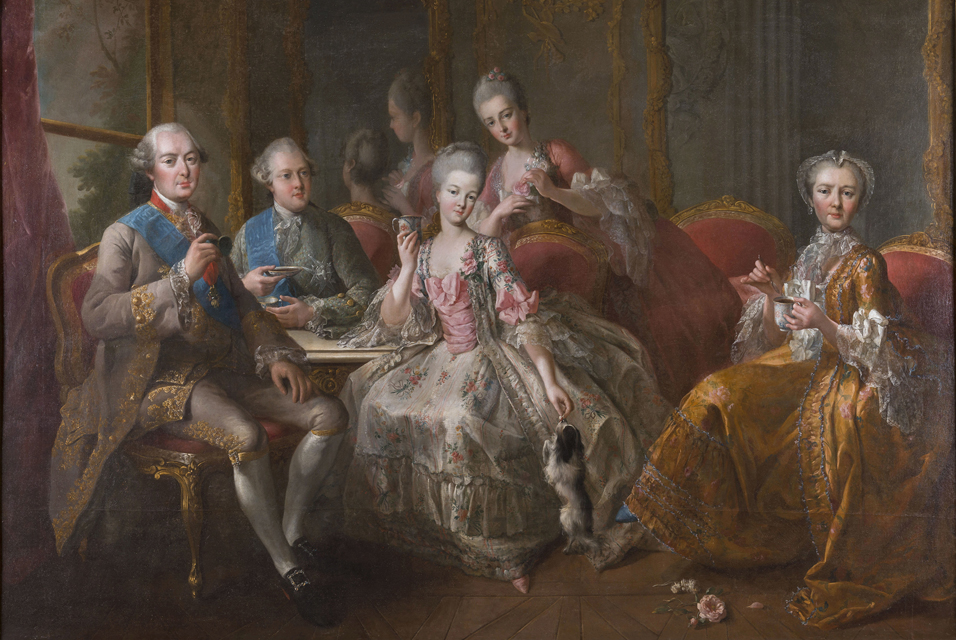
Maria Teresa's family; The Duke of Penthièvre; Prince of Lamballe; Princess of Lamballe; Mademoiselle de Penthièvre next to the Countess of Toulouse

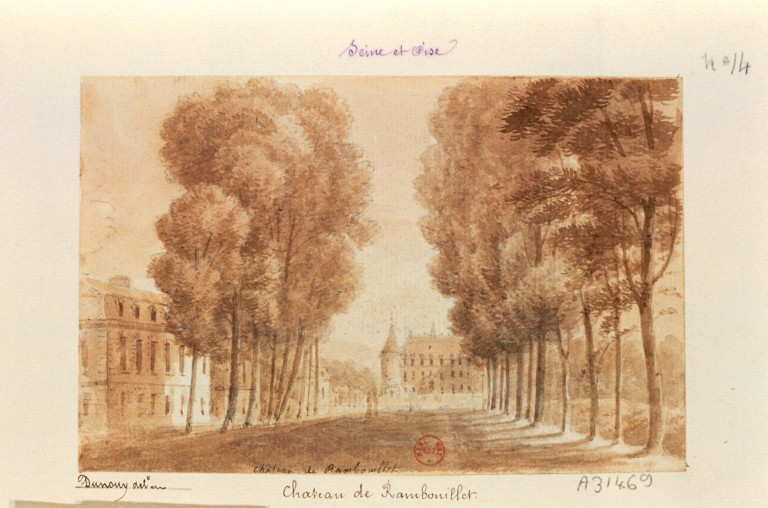
The Château de Rambouillet

== Arms ==
Coat of arms of Maria Teresa d'Este as Duchess of Penthièvre
Escutcheon Per pale: I, azure, three fleurs-de-lis or and a baton couped gules (Bourbon-Penthièvre); II, quarterly: 1 and 4, or, a double-headed eagle sable, beaked, membered, and bound gules; 2 and 3, azure, three fleurs-de-lis or, a bordure indented gules and or; overall on the second half, a pale gules charged with two keys in saltire—one argent, the other or—bound azure, and in chief a tiara or, banded and surmounted by a cross; overall on the whole, azure, an eagle argent, beaked, langued, and crowned or (Este).

== Ancestry ==
Ancestors of Maria Teresa Felicitas d'Este

16. Alfonso III d'Este, Duke of Modena
8. Francesco I d'Este, Duke of Modena
17. Isabella of Savoy
4. Rinaldo d'Este, Duke of Modena
18. Taddeo Barberini, Principe di Palestrina
9. Lucrezia Barberini
19. Anna Colonna, Principessa di Paliano
2. Francesco III d'Este, Duke of Modena
20. George, Duke of Brunswick-Calenberg
10. John Frederick, Duke of Brunswick-Calenberg
21. Anne Eleonore of Hesse-Darmstadt
5. Charlotte Felicitas of Brunswick
22. Edward, Count Palatine of Simmern
11. Benedicta Henrietta of the Palatinate
23. Anna Gonzaga
1. Maria Teresa Felicitas d'Este
24. Louis XIII of France
12. Philippe I, Duke of Orléans
25. Anne of Austria
6. Philippe II, Duke of Orléans
26. Charles I Louis, Elector Palatine
13. Elisabeth Charlotte of the Palatinate
27. Charlotte of Hesse-Kassel
3. Charlotte Aglaé of Orléans
28. Louis XIII of France (= 24)
14. Louis XIV of France
29. Anne of Austria (= 25)
7. Françoise Marie de Bourbon
30. Gabriel de Rochechouart, Duke of Mortemart
15. Madame de Montespan
31. Diane de Grandseigne
