= Louis Alexandre, Prince of Lamballe =

French noble; great-grandson of Louis XIV (1747–1768)

Louis Alexandre de Bourbon
- Prince of Lamballe
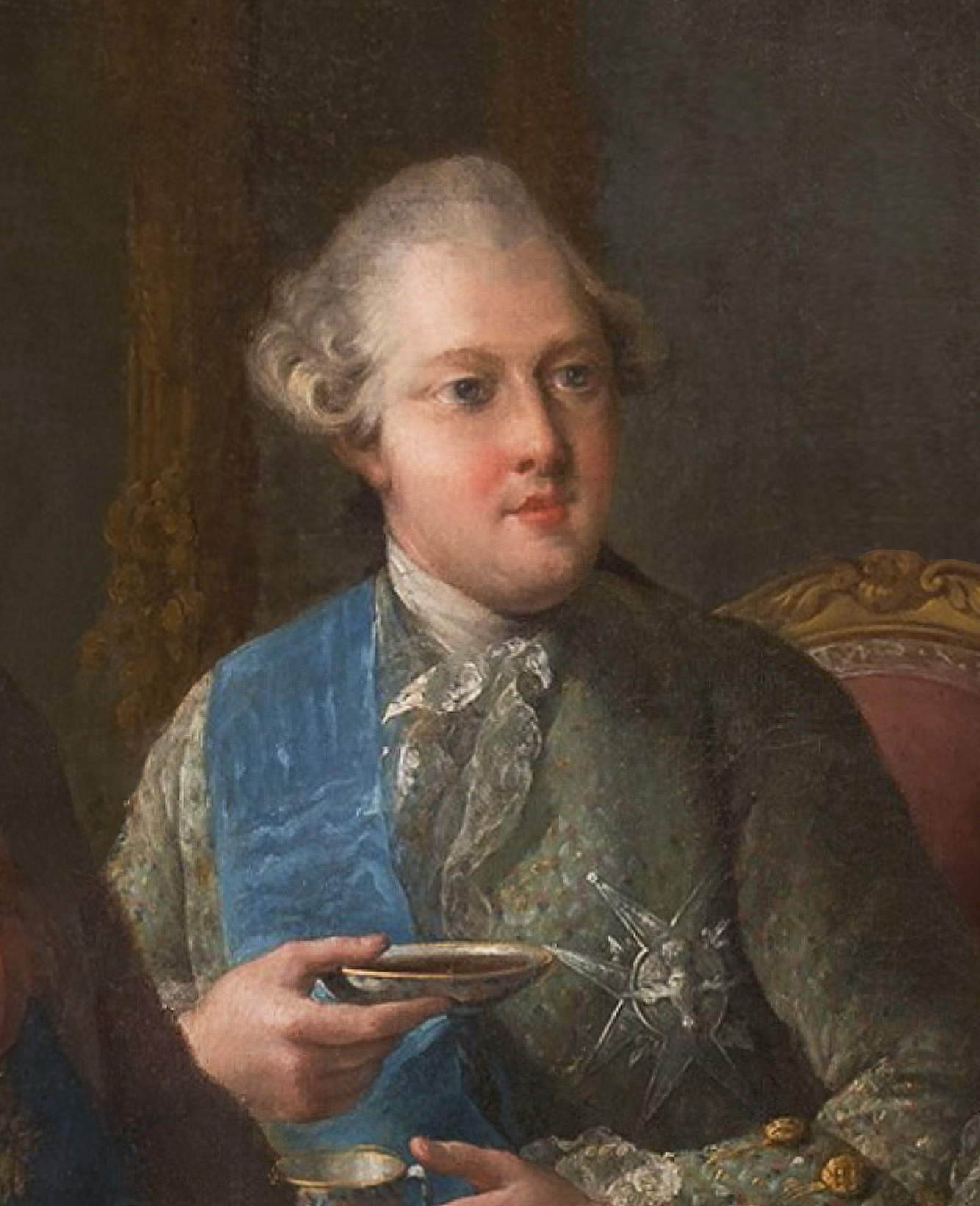
- Born: 6 September 1747; Hôtel de Toulouse, Paris, France
- Died: 6 May 1768 (aged 20); Château de Louveciennes, France
- Burial: Chapelle royale de Dreux, France
- Spouse: Maria Luisa of Savoy (m. 1767)
Names
- Louis Alexandre Joseph Stanislas de Bourbon
- House: Bourbon
- Father: Louis Jean Marie de Bourbon
- Mother: Princess Maria Teresa d'Este

Louis Alexandre de Bourbon (Louis Alexandre Joseph Stanislas; 6 September 1747 – 6 May 1768) was the son and heir of Louis Jean Marie de Bourbon, great-grandson of Louis XIV by the king's legitimised son, Louis Alexandre de Bourbon. He was known as the Prince of Lamballe from birth. He pre-deceased his father, and died childless.

== Biography ==
Louis Alexandre was born on 6 September 1747, at the Hôtel de Toulouse (now the seat of the Banque de France, in the 1st arrondissement of Paris), the Paris residence of his family. His father, the Louis Jean Marie de Bourbon, duc de Penthièvre, was the only legitimate child of Louis Alexandre de Bourbon, the youngest legitimised son of King Louis XIV and Madame de Montespan. His mother, Princess Maria Teresa d'Este, was the daughter of the Duke of Modena, also a descendant of Madame de Montespan, and related to the House of Orléans. The prince de Lamballe, as he was known all his life, was the couple's only surviving son. He was one of seven children.

At the death of his older brother Louis Marie de Bourbon, the Prince of Lamballe became the heir to the Penthièvre fortune, much of which had been extorted by Louis XIV from his childless cousin la Grande Mademoiselle, and bestowed upon Louis XIV's legitimised elder son, Louis Auguste de Bourbon, duc du Maine. His title, prince de Lamballe, came from one of the seigneuries owned by his father; it was neither a sovereign princedom nor a legal title. Rather, it was a titre de courtoisie. His mother died in childbirth in 1754 at the age of twenty-seven.

=== Marriage ===
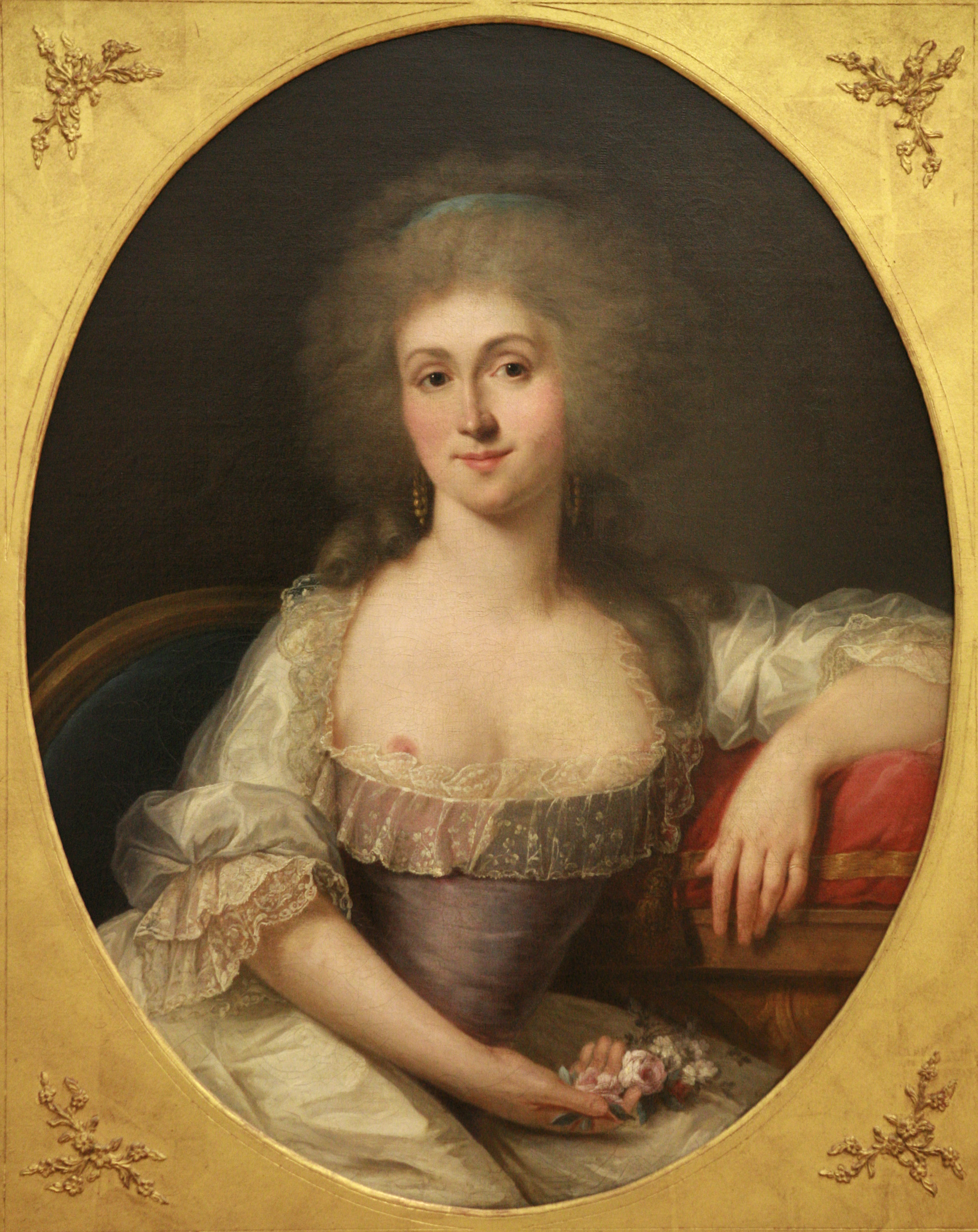
Portrait of Marie Thérése, by Joseph Duplessis (c. 1775)

His father chose his bride, the Italian born Princess Maria Teresa Louisa of Savoy. The wedding celebration lasted from 17 January 1767, until 27 January with feasts in Turin and Nangis. Prior to the wedding, Louis Alexandre, eager to see his future bride, went secretly where Maria Teresa was staying. He met her disguised as a simple country servant and offered her a bouquet of flowers in his "master's" name. During the wedding ceremony the next day, the princess was shocked to discover that the humble man from the previous day was in fact the prince himself. After the ceremony, for their honeymoon, Louis Alexandre and his bride stayed at the Château de Nangis. His father had specifically chosen Maria Teresa as his son's wife due to her renowned piety and beauty. He thought that such a spouse would help make his son change his libertine lifestyle.

Princess Maria Luisa was the sixth child of the Prince of Carignan and his German wife Landgravine Christine Henriette of Hesse-Rotenburg, the sister of the late Princess of Condé. After three months of happiness, Louis Alexandre, a jaded hedonist, soon tired of his young wife and resumed his life of débaucherie. He eloped with Mademoiselle de La Chassaigne, an opera dancer, five months into his marriage. At one point, Louis Alexandre even sold his wife's diamonds to raise money to pay his debts.

== Death ==
After a dissipated short life, Louis Alexandre died on 6 May 1768, sixteen months after his marriage, of a venereal disease at the Château de Louveciennes in the arms of his ever dutiful wife. He died without any issue. At his death, his father requested that the Gazette de France post a small note for the deceased prince:

Louis Alexander Joseph Stanislas de Bourbon, Prince de Lamballe, first huntsman of France, died at the Château de Louveciennes, near Versailles, the 6th of this month, at half-past eight o'clock in the morning, aged twenty years and eight months. He was born the 6th of September, 1747. He was married the 17th of January, 1767, to Marie Thérèse Louise de Carignan. We cannot too highly commend the sentiments of piety and resignation and the courage which this prince showed during his long illness, up to the last moments of his life. On account of his death the court will wear mourning for ten days.

He was buried in the family crypt in 13th-century Saint-Lubin church of the village of Rambouillet near the Château de Rambouillet, his father's favorite residence. In 1783, the duc de Penthièvre sold the domain of Rambouillet to his cousin, King Louis XVI. On 25 November that year, in a long religious procession, Penthièvre transferred the nine caskets containing the remains of his parents, the comte and the comtesse de Toulouse, his wife, Maria Teresa d'Este, and six of their seven children, from the small medieval village church of Rambouillet, to the chapel of the Collégiale Saint-Étienne in Dreux.

== Ancestry ==
Ancestors of Louis Alexandre, Prince of Lamballe

8. Louis XIV of France
4. Louis Alexandre, Count of Toulouse
9. Madame de Montespan
2. Louis Jean Marie, Duke of Penthièvre
10. Anne Jules, duc de Noailles
5. Marie Victoire de Noailles
11. Marie-Françoise de Bournonville
1.Louis Alexandre, Prince of Lamballe
12. Rinaldo d'Este, Duke of Modena
6. Francesco III d'Este, Duke of Modena
13. Charlotte of Brunswick
3. Maria Teresa Felicitas d'Este
14. Philippe II, Duke of Orléans
7. Charlotte Aglaé of Orléans
15. Françoise Marie de Bourbon
