= Marie Victoire de Noailles =

Countess of Toulouse (1688–1766)

- Countess of Toulouse; Marchioness of Gondrin
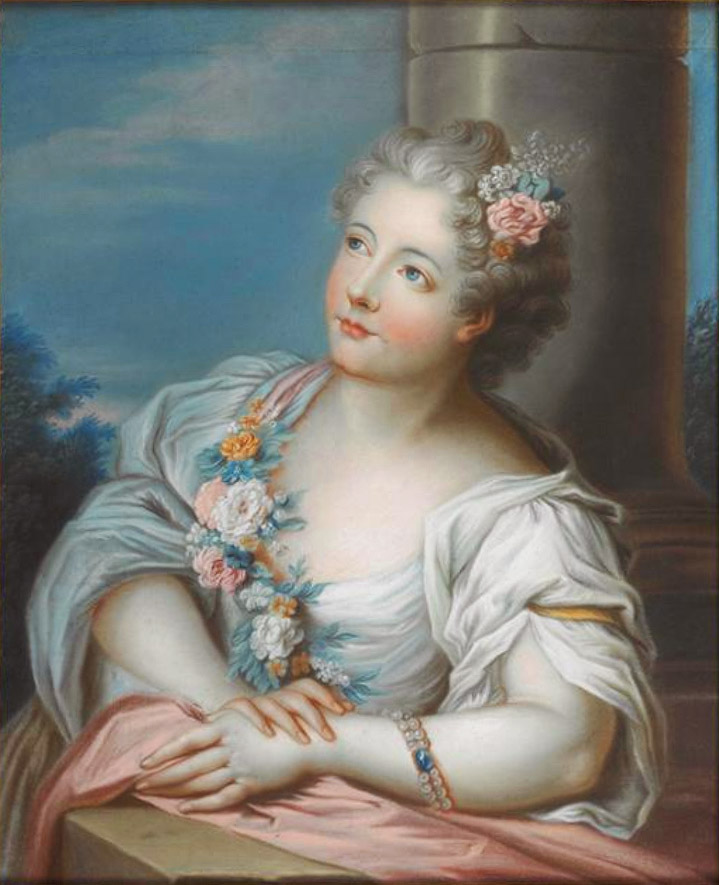
- Born: 6 May 1688; Palace of Versailles, Kingdom of France
- Died: 30 September 1766 (aged 78); Hôtel de Toulouse, Paris, Kingdom of France
- Burial: Chapelle royale de Dreux, Dreux, France
- Spouse: Louis de Pardaillan de Gondrin; Louis Alexandre de Bourbon
- Issue: Louis, Duke of Antin; Antoine François, Marquis of Gondrin; Louis Jean Marie de Bourbon, Duke of Penthièvre
Names
- Marie Victoire Sophie de Noailles
- House: Noailles
- Father: Anne Jules de Noailles
- Mother: Marie-Françoise de Bournonville

Marie Victoire Sophie de Noailles, Countess of Toulouse (6 May 1688 in Versailles – 30 September 1766 in Paris), was a French noble and courtier. Her second husband was Louis Alexandre de Bourbon, Count of Toulouse, the youngest legitimized son of King Louis XIV and his maîtresse-en-titre, Madame de Montespan.

== Early life ==
Marie Victoire was born at Versailles on 6 May 1688, as the younger daughter of Anne Jules de Noailles, the 2nd Duke of Noailles and his wife, Marie-Françoise de Bournonville (1656-1748). She was the thirteenth of twenty children. Several of her sisters married into important noble families in France. Her sister Marie Christine married Antoine de Gramont, duc de Guiche in 1687. Another sister, Lucie Félicité, married the Maréchal d'Estrées, great-nephew of King Henri IV's famous mistress, Gabrielle d'Estrées. Yet another sister married Charles de La Baume Le Blanc, the nephew of Louise de La Vallière, and became the mother of Louis César de La Baume Le Blanc, Duke de La Vallière.

=== First marriage ===
In 1707, Marie Victoire married Louis de Pardaillan de Gondrin, whose father, Louis Antoine de Pardaillan de Gondrin, was the son of Louis Henri de Pardaillan de Gondrin, marquis de Montespan (1640–1701) and of his wife, Françoise Athénaïs de Rochechouart de Mortemart, marquise de Montespan. Thus, while her first husband was the grandson of Madame de Montespan, the second, the comte de Toulouse (1678–1737), who was the son of Madame de Montespan with Louis XIV, was her first husband's uncle, ten years younger than his nephew.

At the time of her first marriage, Marie Victoire, marquise de Gondrin, was a dame du palais to the king's granddaughter-in-law, the duchesse de Bourgogne, future Dauphine of France and mother of King Louis XV.

From her first marriage, Marie Victoire had two children:

- Louis de Pardaillan de Gondrin (1707–1743), Duke of Antin
- Antoine François de Pardaillan de Gondrin (1709–1741), Marquis of Gondrin.

In 1712, both her husband and the duchesse de Bourgogne died.

=== Second marriage ===
On 2 February 1723, Marie Victoire married, in a secret ceremony, the comte de Toulouse, the legitimized younger son of Louis XIV and Madame de Montespan. The marriage was announced only after the death of the Régent in December of the same year.

When she married the comte de Toulouse, Marie Victoire became the Countess of Toulouse, Duchess of Vendôme, Duchess of Rambouillet, Duchess of Arc-en-Barrois, Duchess of Châteauvillain, Duchess of Penthièvre.

After two years of marriage, Marie Victoire gave birth to the couple's only child, a son, the sole heir of his father:

- Louis Jean Marie de Bourbon (1725–1793), duc de Penthièvre, was the founder of the House of Bourbon-Penthièvre.

The comte and comtesse de Toulouse had official rooms at Versailles. Their apartments, which later were given to the daughters of the new king, Louis XV, were situated on the ground floor of the palace and were the former suite of rooms which had belonged to the comte's mother, Madame de Montespan.

=== Widowhood ===
The comte de Toulouse died on 1 December 1737. In 1744, Marie Victoire helped to arrange the marriage of her son. The chosen bride was an Italian princess, Marie Thérèse Félicité d'Este, who was also a descendant of Madame de Montespan. The bride was the granddaughter of Françoise-Marie de Bourbon, sister of the comte de Toulouse, who had married the duc d'Orléans, Régent of France during the minority of King Louis XV.

Marie Victoire had a very good relationship with the young Louis XV, who was her son's godfather. According to Nancy Mitford's book on Madame de Pompadour, she was the only woman who was allowed to see the young king without an official appointment. She also had access to all of his private papers of state. After his mother died when he was only two years old, Marie Victoire became the nearest female family member to the motherless child.

On 30 September 1766, Marie Victoire died at the Hôtel de Toulouse, the Parisian townhouse bought by her husband in 1713. She was buried beside her husband in the family crypt at the 10th-century Saint-Lubin church of the then village of Rambouillet. In November 1783, after having sold the Château de Rambouillet and its vast domain to King Louis XVI, her son, the duc de Penthièvre, transferred her remains, together with those of her husband, and those of his wife and their deceased children, to the Collégiale de Saint-Etienne de Dreux.

== Descendants ==
Marie Victoire is a direct ancestor of the modern House of Orléans through her granddaughter, Louise Marie Adélaïde de Bourbon, the wife of Philippe Égalité, who was the mother of Louis Philippe I, King of the French. Through the House of Orléans, she is also an ancestor of the modern Belgian royal family, as well as the now defunct Brazilian and Bulgarian royal families.
