= Château de Rambouillet =

Château in Rambouillet, Yvelines, France

Coordinates: 48°38′44″N 1°49′04″E

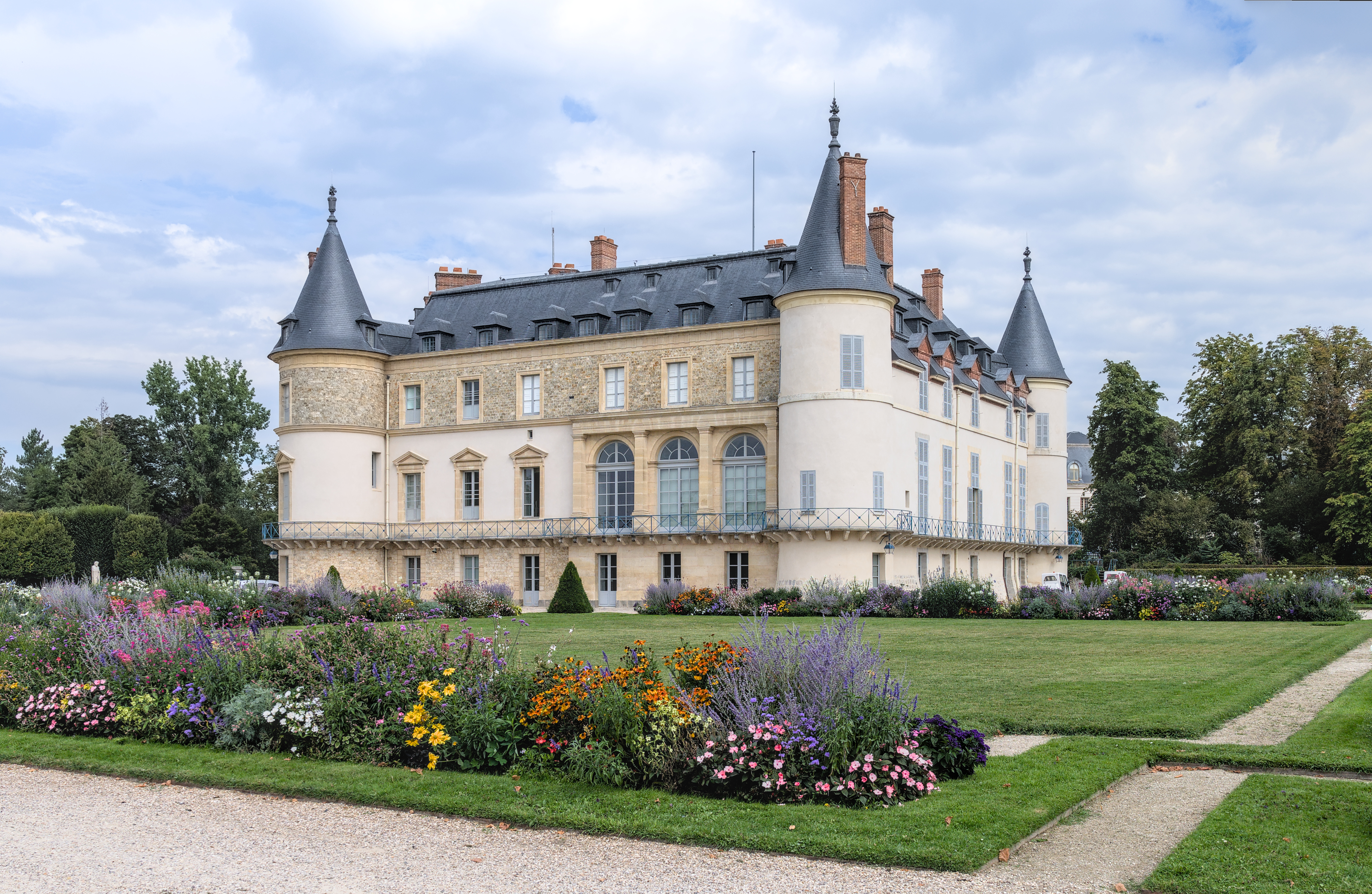
The château seen from its French formal garden

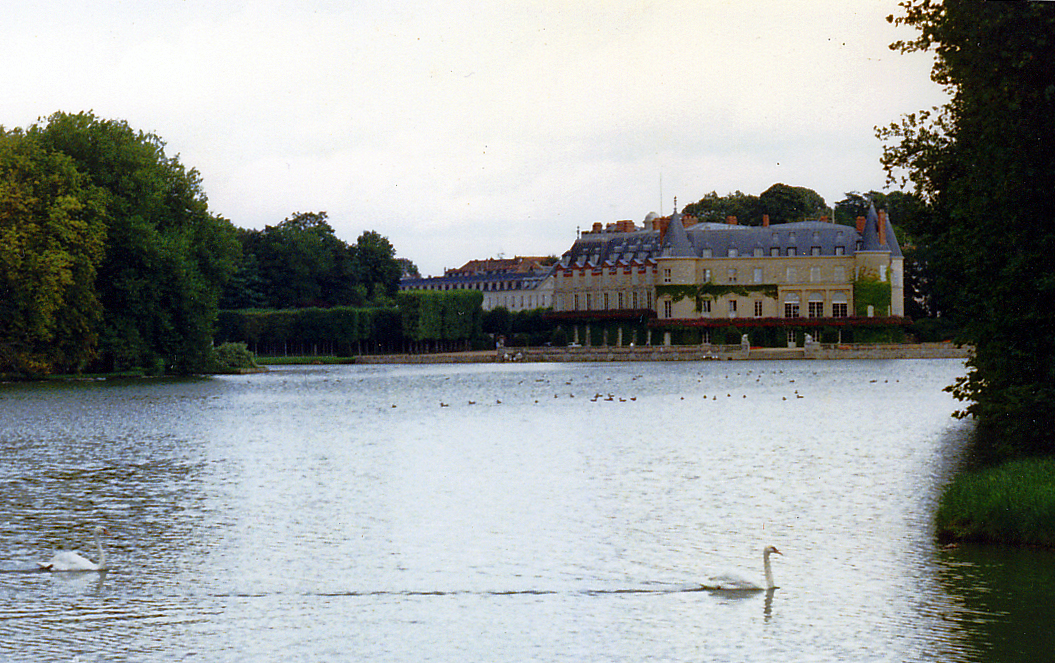
The château seen from the tapis vert across the central canal

The Château de Rambouillet (pronounced [ʃɑto d(ə) ʁɑ̃bujɛ]), also known in English as the Castle of Rambouillet, is a château in the town of Rambouillet, Yvelines department, in the Île-de-France region in northern France, 50 km (31 mi) southwest of Paris. It was the summer residence of the Presidents of France from 1896 until 2009, and it is now managed by the Centre des monuments nationaux.

== History ==
The château was originally a fortified manor dating back to 1368 and, although amputated of its eastern wing at the time of Napoleon, it still retains its pentagonal bastioned footprint. King Francis I died there, on 31 March 1547, probably in the imposing medieval tower that bears his name. Like the Hôtel de Rambouillet in Paris, the château was owned by Charles d'Angennes, the marquis de Rambouillet during the reign of Louis XIII. Avenues led directly from the park of the château into the adjacent game-rich forest. More than 200 square kilometres of forest remain, the remnant of the Forest of Rambouillet, also known as Forêt d'Yveline or Forêt de l'Yveline.

In 1783, the château became the private property of King Louis XVI, who bought it from his cousin, Louis Jean Marie de Bourbon, Duke of Penthièvre, as an extension of his hunting grounds. Queen Marie Antoinette, who accompanied her husband on a visit in November 1783, is said to have exclaimed: "Comment pourrais-je vivre dans cette gothique crapaudière !" ("How could I live in such a gothic toadhouse!") However, to induce his wife to like his new acquisition, Louis XVI commissioned in great secret the construction of the renowned Laiterie de la Reine (the Queen's dairy), where the buckets were of Sèvres porcelain, painted and grained to imitate wood, and the presiding nymph was a marble Amalthea, with the goat that nurtured Jupiter, sculpted by Pierre Julien. A little salon was attached to the dairy itself, with chairs supplied by Georges Jacob in 1787 that had straight, tapering stop-fluted legs.

During the French Revolution, the domain of Rambouillet became a bien national ('national property'), the château being emptied of its furnishings and the gardens and surrounding park falling into neglect.

During the reign of Napoleon I, Rambouillet was included in his liste civile (list of government-owned property at the disposal of the head of state). The Emperor came several times to Rambouillet, the last being on the night of 29–30 June 1815, on his way to exile to Saint Helena. Among the reminders of Napoléon are the Pompeian style bathroom with its small bathtub and the exquisite balcony built to link the Emperor's apartment to that of his second wife, the Empress Marie-Louise. Another reminder of Napoléon was the splendid Allée de Cyprès chauves de Louisiane, a double-lined bald cypress (Taxodium distichum) avenue.

At the time of the Bourbon Restoration, Rambouillet was again included in the royal liste civile. Fifteen years after Napoleon I, Charles X's road to exile also started at Rambouillet. On 2 August 1830, he signed his abdication here in favour of his nine-year-old grandson, the Duke of Bordeaux. It took twenty minutes to talk his son, Louis-Antoine, Duke of Angoulême, into, reluctantly, countersigning the document, thus abandoning his rights to the throne of France in favor of his nephew.

From 1830 to 1848, the domain of Rambouillet, which had belonged to his grandfather, the duke of Penthièvre, was not included in Louis Philippe I's liste civile; however, begged to do so by the townspeople, the Emperor Napoléon III, who reigned from 1852 to 1870, requested its inclusion in his.

After the fall of Napoleon III in 1870, which saw the beginning of the French Third Republic, the domain of Rambouillet was leased from 1870 to 1883 to the duke of la Trémoille. In February 1896, Rambouillet received a visit from President Félix Faure who then decided to spend his summers there with his family. Since, the château of Rambouillet has become the summer residence of France's presidents of the republic, who entertain, and used to invite to hunting parties many foreign dignitaries, princes and heads of state. As a part-time residence of the French president, it is sometimes referred to as the Palace of Rambouillet.

On 23 August 1944, two days before the liberation of Paris, General Charles de Gaulle arrived at Rambouillet and set up his headquarters in the chateau where, in the evening, he met General Philippe Leclerc who, at the head of his French 2nd Armored Division, was given its mission to liberate Paris. Part of the French 2nd Armored Division was to leave from Rambouillet at dawn the following day, on its march "to capture Paris". On 25 August, around 2 p.m., "both wrought with emotion and filled with serenity", General de Gaulle left Rambouillet by car to enter "Paris libérée".

During the 1960s, "Foreign leaders were often put up in the magnificent surroundings of the Château de Rambouillet," and foreign dignitaries would be invited to shoot birds there in autumn.

In November 1975, the first "G6" summit was organized in the château by French President Valéry Giscard d'Estaing for the heads of the world's leading industrialized countries. Attending were: Gerald Ford (United States), Harold Wilson (United Kingdom), Aldo Moro (Italy), Takeo Miki (Japan) and Helmut Schmidt (West Germany).

The Château de Rambouillet continues to be used as a venue for bilateral summits and, in February 1999, was host to the negotiations on Kosovo. (See Kosovo War and Rambouillet Agreement.)

On 26 December 1999, Hurricane Lothar hit the northern half of France, wreaking havoc on forests, parks and buildings. The Forest of Rambouillet lost hundreds of thousands of trees, and among the over 5,000 downed trees in the park of Rambouillet, was the handsome, historical Allée de Cyprès chauves de Louisiane, the bald cypress avenue planted in 1810.

== Sources ==
- André Castelot, Charles X, La fin d'un monde, Librairie Académique Perrin, Paris, 1988.
- Svend Eriksen, 1974. Early Neo-Classicism in France, Faber & Faber, London, 1974.
- G. Lenotre, Le Château de Rambouillet, six siècles d'histoire, Calmann-Lévy, Paris, 1930; new publication, Denoël, Paris, 1984.
- Françoise Winieska, Août 1944, la Libération de Rambouillet, France, Société Historique et Archéologique de Rambouillet et de l'Yveline (SHARY), Rambouillet, 1999, ISBN 2-9514047-0-0, English version by author under the title August 1944, the Liberation of Rambouillet, France, published by SHARY under same cover, ISBN 2-9514047-0-0.
