= Romulus (disambiguation) =

Romulus was one of the mythical founders of Rome.

Romulus may also refer to:

== People, characters, figures, individuals ==
=== Persons with the given name ===
- Romulus Silvius (said to r. 873-854 BC), purported ancestor of the founder of Rome.
- Romulus Augustulus, the last Western Roman Emperor
- Marcus Aurelius Valerius Romulus (Divus Romulus), deified son of the Roman emperor Maxentius
- Romulus (son of Anthemius), son of the Western Roman emperor Anthemius
- Romulus (fabulist)
- Saint Romulus (martyr) (died 117), Christian martyr during the reign of the Roman emperor Trajan
- Saint Romulus of Genoa, bishop of Genoa
- Saint Romulus of Fiesole
- Saint Romulus (died c. 304), Christian martyr (see Saints Donatus, Romulus, Secundian, and 86 Companions)
- Flavius Romulus (died 351), Roman politician
- Romulus Bărbulescu, Romanian writer
- Romulus Buia, Romanian footballer
- Romulus Cioflec, Romanian journalist
- Romulus Gabor, Romanian footballer
- Romulus Z. Linney, American politician, great-grandfather of Romulus Linney
- Romulus Linney (playwright), American playwright, father of Laura Linney
- Romulus Miclea, Romanian footballer
- Romulus Vereș, Romanian serial killer

=== Persons with the surname ===
- Ray Romulus, music producer

=== Fictional characters ===
- Romulus (comics), a Marvel Comics supervillain
- Romulus Thread, a Hunger Games character

=== Individual animals ===
- Romulus, one of three greywolf hybrids created by Colossal Biosciences in 2024 using DNA from extinct dire wolf
- Romulus (donkey), world's tallest donkey as certified by Guinness World Records

== Places ==
- Romulus Glacier, Rymill Bay, Graham Land, Antarctica; a glacier
- Mount Romulus, Little Elbow River Valley, Kananaskis Country, Alberta, Canada; a mountain
- Romulus (moon), a moon of the asteroid 87 Sylvia in the Main Asteroid Belt
- 10386 Romulus, a Main Belt asteroid
- Temple of Romulus, Rome, Italy

=== Places in the United States ===
- Romulus, Michigan, a city
  - Romulus Community School District
    - Romulus Senior High School
  - Romulus Army Airfield
- Romulus, New York, a town in Seneca County, New York
- Romulus (CDP), New York, a hamlet and census-designated place in Seneca County, New York
- Romulus, Alabama, a community in Tuscaloosa County, Alabama

=== Fictional locations ===
- Hut of Romulus, the mythical dwelling of the first king of Rome
- Romulus (Star Trek), the fictional homeworld of the Romulans in Star Trek
- Weyland-Yutani Romulus, a fictional space station, a component space station with WY Remus in the compound station WY Renaissance; one of the primary settings of the 2024 film Alien: Romulus

== Arts, entertainment, media ==
- Romulus (album), by Ex Deo, 2009

=== Stage and screen ===
- Romulus (Dumas play), an 1854 play by Alexandre Dumas, père
- Romulus (opera), a 2007 comic opera by Louis Karchin, based on Dumas' play
- Romulus (TV series), a 2020 Italian TV-series
- Alien: Romulus, American science fiction horror film and a standalone installment in the Alien franchise

== Groups, organizations ==
- Romulus F.C., a non-league football team based in Castle Vale, England
- Romulus Films, a British film production company

== Transport ==
- Romulus, a South Devon Railway 0-6-0ST steam locomotive; see South Devon Railway Remus class

=== Ships ===
- HMS Romulus, the name of two ships of the Royal Navy
- French ship Romulus, the name of two ships of France
  - French ship Romulus (1812), ship of the line of the French Navy
- Romulus-class destroyer, a Swedish Royal Navy shipclass
  - HSwMS Romulus (27), ex-Spica, destroyer of the Royal Swedish Navy

== Other ==
- Romulus (beetle), a genus of beetle in the family Cerambycidae
- Romulus (modelling kernel), a CAD software component
- Romulus (typeface), a font

== See also ==
- Saint Romulus (disambiguation)
- Romulus and Remus (disambiguation)
- Romolo (disambiguation)
- Remus (disambiguation)
