= Remus (disambiguation) =

Remus is the twin brother of the mythical founder of Rome.

Remus may also refer to:

== Places ==
- Remus Glacier, Graham Land, Antarctica; a glacier
- Remus River, Mexico; a river
- Mount Remus, Little Elbow River Valley, Kananaskis Country, Alberta, Canada; a mountain
- Remuș, a village in Frătești Commune, Giurgiu County, Romania
- Ramosch (in German: Remüs), a former municipality in the canton of Graubünden, Switzerland
- Remus, an unincorporated community in Wheatland Township, Mecosta County, Michigan, United States
- Remus, Georgia, United States; an unincorporated community
- Remus, West Virginia, United States; an unincorporated community
- Remus (moon), a moon of the asteroid 87 Sylvia in the Main Asteroid Belt

=== Fictional locations ===
- Remus (Star Trek), a fictional planet in Star Trek
- Weyland-Yutani Remus, a fictional space station, a component space station with WY Romulus in the compound station WY Renaissance; one of the primary settings of the 2024 film Alien: Romulus

== People and fictional characters ==
- Remus (given name), a list of people and fictional characters
- Remus (surname), a list of people

== Transportation and vehicular ==
- HSwMS Remus, a Royal Swedish Navy destroyer
- USS Remus, a World War II landing craft repair ship of the United States Navy
- REMUS (AUV), an underwater autonomous vehicle developed by Woods Hole Oceanographic Institution
- South Devon Railway Remus class, a South Devon Railway 0-6-0ST steam locomotive

== Other uses ==
- Remus Films, a UK film production company

== See also ==
- Uncle Remus (disambiguation)
- Florinus of Remüs (died 856), Roman Catholic saint
- Papilio remus (P. remus), a butterfly
- Romulus and Remus (disambiguation)
- Romulus (disambiguation)
