= Romulus and Remus (disambiguation) =

Romulus and Remus are the mythical twin founders of Rome

Romulus and Remus or Remus and Romulus, may also refer to:

== Locations ==
- Romulus–Remus orbital resonance system, the moon system of the Main-Belt asteroid 87 Sylvia

=== Fictional locations ===
- Romulus and Remus (Star Trek), a fictional location, the twin homeworlds of the Romulan Empire in Star Trek
- Romulus and Remus, Weyland-Yutani conjoined-twin space stations, forming the fictional compound station WY Renaissance; the primary settings of the 2024 film Alien: Romulus

== Arts, entertainment, media ==
- Romulus & Remus: The First King (film), 2019 Italian historical drama film
- Romulus and Remus (1961), 1961 Italian-French film
- Romulus and Remus (Rubens), a painting by Peter Paul Rubens
- Statue of Romulus and Remus, a folly in Somerset, England

== Other uses ==
- Romulus and Remus, fictional twin boys found in the New Zealand TV show Shortland Street; see List of Shortland Street characters (2017)
- Romulus and Remus, genetically modified grey wolves born in 2024

== See also ==
- Romulus and Remus Taken in by Faustulus (painting), an artwork by Pietro da Cortona
- Search for "Romulus" and "Remus" in page names
- Romulus (disambiguation)
- Remus (disambiguation)
- Category:Cultural depictions of Romulus and Remus
- Capitoline Wolf (disambiguation); the Capitoline Wolf, the she-wolf that nursed Romulus and Remus in mythology
- Sylvia (disambiguation); Rhea Sylvia the Trojan, the mother of the twins Romulus and Remus in mythology
- Rhea (disambiguation); Rhea Sylvia the Trojan, the mother of the twins Romulus and Remus in mythology
- Rome (disambiguation); the city founded by the mythical Romulus and Remus
