= Caesar Restoring Cleopatra to the Throne of Egypt =

Painting by Pietro da Cortona

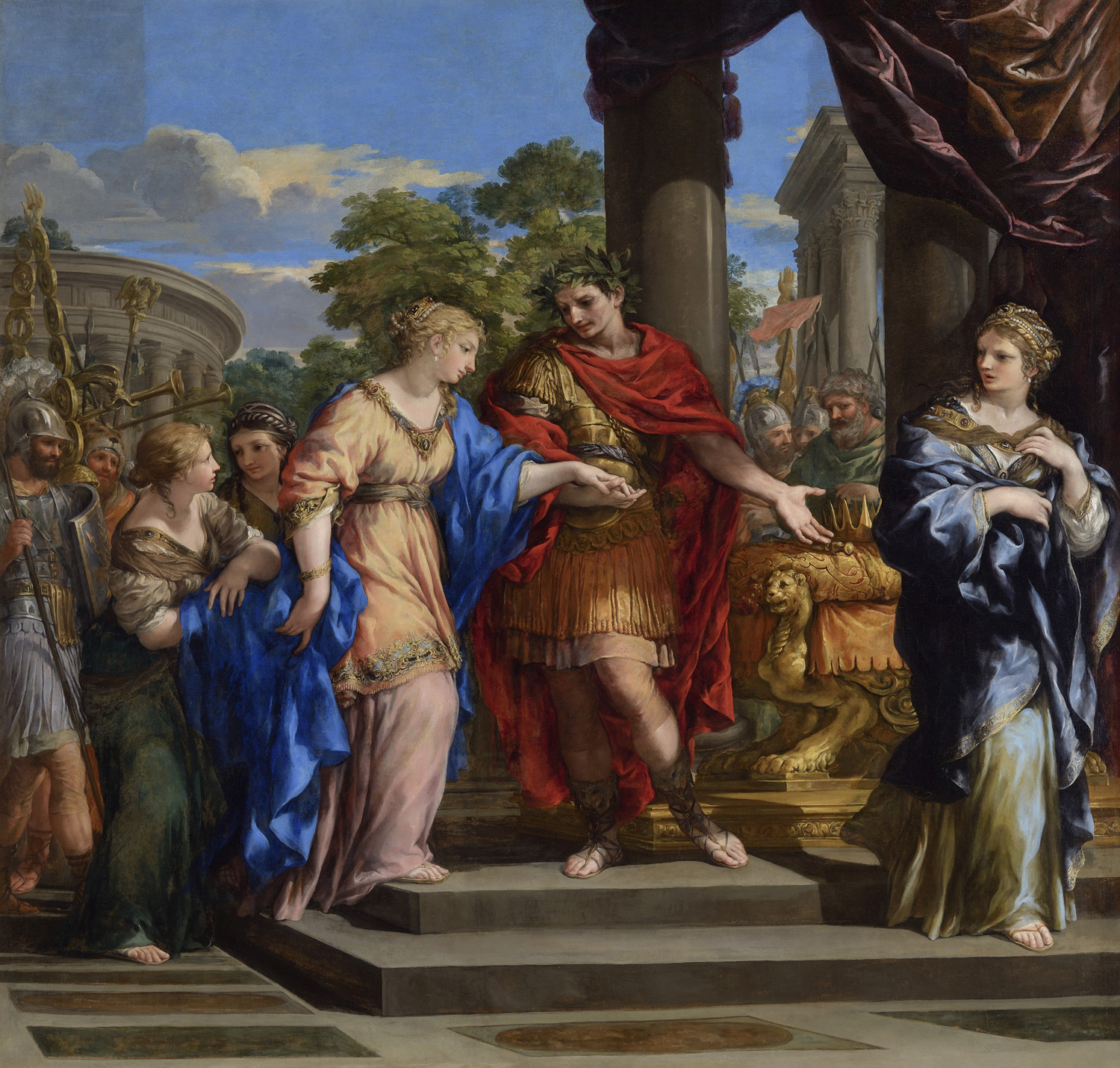
Caesar Restoring Cleopatra to the Throne of Egypt (c. 1637–1643) by Pietro da Cortona

Caesar Restoring Cleopatra to the Throne of Egypt' is an oil on canvas painting by Pietro da Cortona, one of three works by this artist (Note: The other two are Augustus and the Tiburian Sibyl and Faustulus Entrusting Romulus and Remus to Larentia (also known as Remus Discovered).) and six works by others commissioned by Louis Phélypeaux, Seigneur of La Vrillière for the gilded gallery at his new hôtel de La Vrillière in Paris - he requested that the nine works be in similar style and dimensions to Guido Reni's The Abduction of Helen (Louvre), the first painting he ever acquired. It is usually dated to 1637 (or to 1643 by base Joconde). It has been in the musée des Beaux-Arts de Lyon since 1811.

The usual interpretation is that it shows Julius Caesar and Cleopatra VII, with her angry deposed sister Arsinoe IV to the right - others are that it shows Mark Antony and Cleopatra (with the angry woman his wife Octavia the Younger) or Caesar repudiating Pompeia Sulla to marry Calpurnia Pisonis. Its female faces and hairstyles are similar to those of The Golden Age (Sala della Stufa, Pitti Palace).

Da Cortona made several preparatory drawings for Caesar, including one also in Florence at the Uffizi's Gabinetto Disegni e Stampe. The Uffizi drawing's format and figures' proportions differ greatly from the finished painting - in the painting the central group is moved further into the foreground and moves from the left background to the right foreground, against the flow of the other groups, whereas in the drawing the figures' proportions correspond to the initial version of Poussin's Camillus Handing the Falerian Schoolmaster over to his Pupils, another painting in the set (both Poussin and da Cortona ultimately adapting their two works de La Vrillière's gallery).
