= Mount Howard =

Mount Howard may refer to the following mountains:

- Mount Howard (Alberta) (2777 m), in the Canadian Rockies
- Mount Howard (Antarctica) (1460 m), in the Prince Albert Mountains
- Mount Howard (British Columbia) (2551 m), in the Coast Mountains
- Mount Howard (Oregon) (2516 m), in the Wallowa Mountains
- Mount Howard (Washington) (2153 m), in the North Cascades
