= Hôtel de Toulouse =

Coordinates: 48.8652°N 2.33982°E

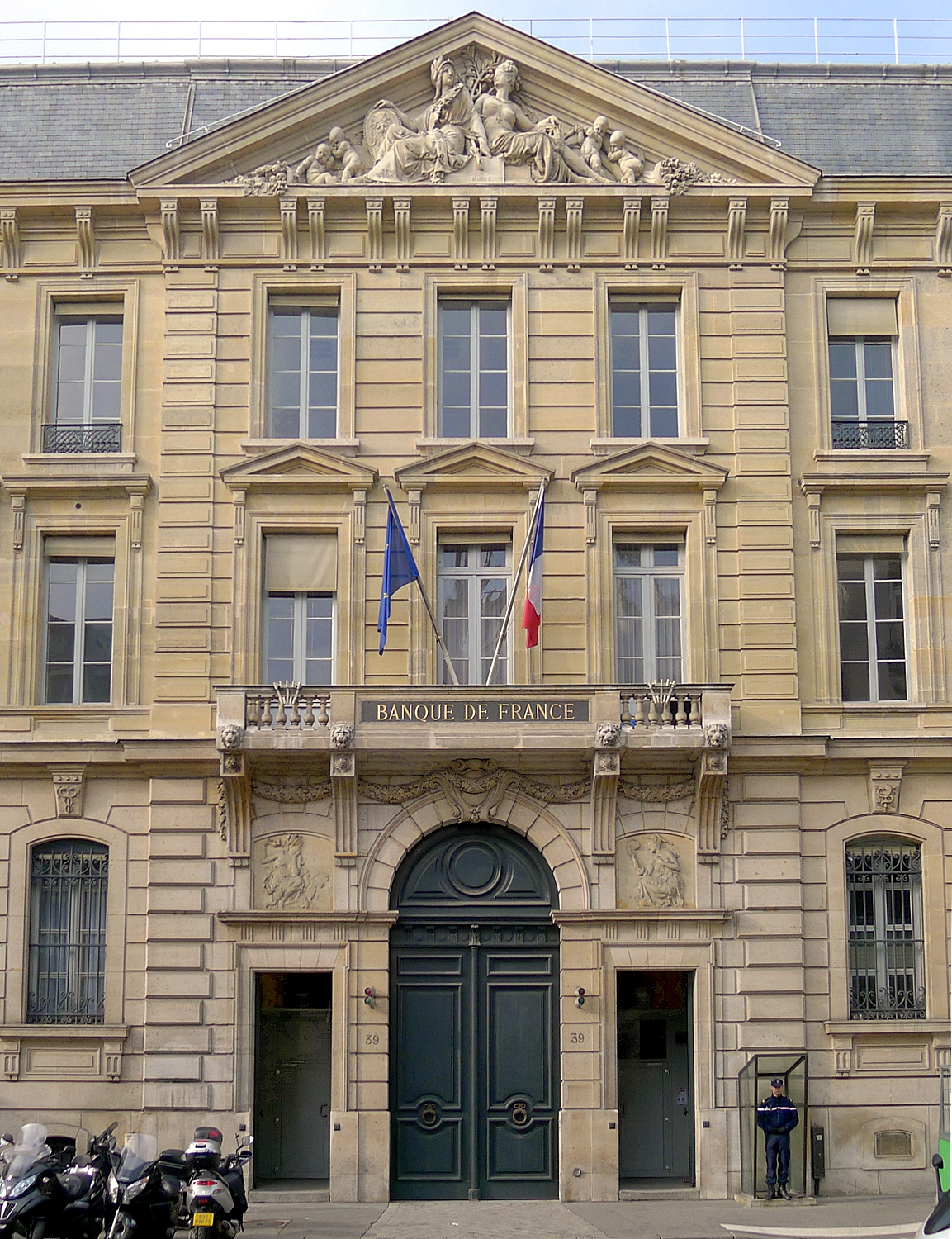
- Hôtel de Toulouse, headquarters of the Banque de France
- Interactive map of the Hôtel de Toulouse area

General information
- Location: Paris, France

The Hôtel de Toulouse (French pronunciation: [otɛl də tuluz]), former Hôtel de La Vrillière is located at 1 rue de La Vrillière, in the 1st arrondissement of Paris. Originally, the mansion had a large garden with a formal parterre to the southwest.

== History ==
It was built between 1635 and 1640 by François Mansart, for Louis Phélypeaux, seigneur de La Vrillière. This included its noted 'Galerie dorée' or gilded gallery, for which Phélypeaux also commissioned nine paintings:

- Guercino -
  - Cato of Utica Bidding Farewell to his Son, 1635, musée des Beaux-Arts de Marseille
  - Coriolanus' Mother Pleading With Him, 1643, musée des Beaux-arts, Caen
  - Hersilia Separating Romulus and Tatius, 1645, Louvre, Paris
- Pietro da Cortona:
  - Caesar Restoring Cleopatra to the Throne of Egypt, musée des beaux-arts de Lyon
  - Romulus and Remus Taken in by Faustulus or Faustulus Entrusting Romulus and Remus to Larentia, Louvre, Paris
  - Augustus and the Sibyl, musée des beaux-arts de Nancy
- Alessandro Turchi, The Death of Cleopatra, c.1640, musée des beaux-arts de Nancy
- Poussin, Camillus Handing the Falerian Schoolmaster over to his Pupils, Louvre, Paris
- Carlo Maratta, The Emperor Augustus Closes the Doors of the Temple of Janus (aka The Peace of Augustus), 1655-1657, palais des Beaux-Arts de Lille

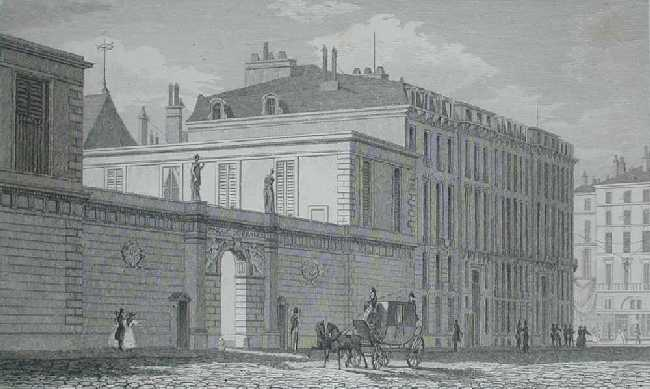
View of the front entrance of the Hôtel de Toulouse

In 1712, Louis Alexandre de Bourbon, Count of Toulouse (son of Louis XIV and Madame de Montespan) acquired the Hôtel de La Vrillière and commissioned Robert de Cotte, Premier Architecte du Roi, to redesign it and bring important transformations to its interior.

After the death of Toulouse in 1737, the Hôtel became the Parisian residence of his son, Louis Jean Marie de Bourbon, Duke of Penthièvre, and the birthplace of the latter's daughter, Louise Marie Adélaïde de Bourbon. The princesse de Lamballe, who was the Duke of Penthièvre's widowed daughter-in-law, also resided there until the French Revolution.

Confiscated as a bien national ("national property") during the French Revolution, the Hôtel de Toulouse became the Imprimerie de la République in 1795. An imperial decree signed by Napoleon I on 6 March 1808, authorised the sale of the Hôtel de Toulouse to the Banque de France, which made it its official seat in 1811.

== Filming location ==
The Hôtel de Toulouse was the site of a scene from Sofia Coppola's Marie Antoinette with its famous Galerie dorée (one of Robert de Cotte's masterpieces) as a room in a palace of her youth. Other films, both French, shot at the site are Vatel and Tous les matins du monde.

== Gallery of residents ==
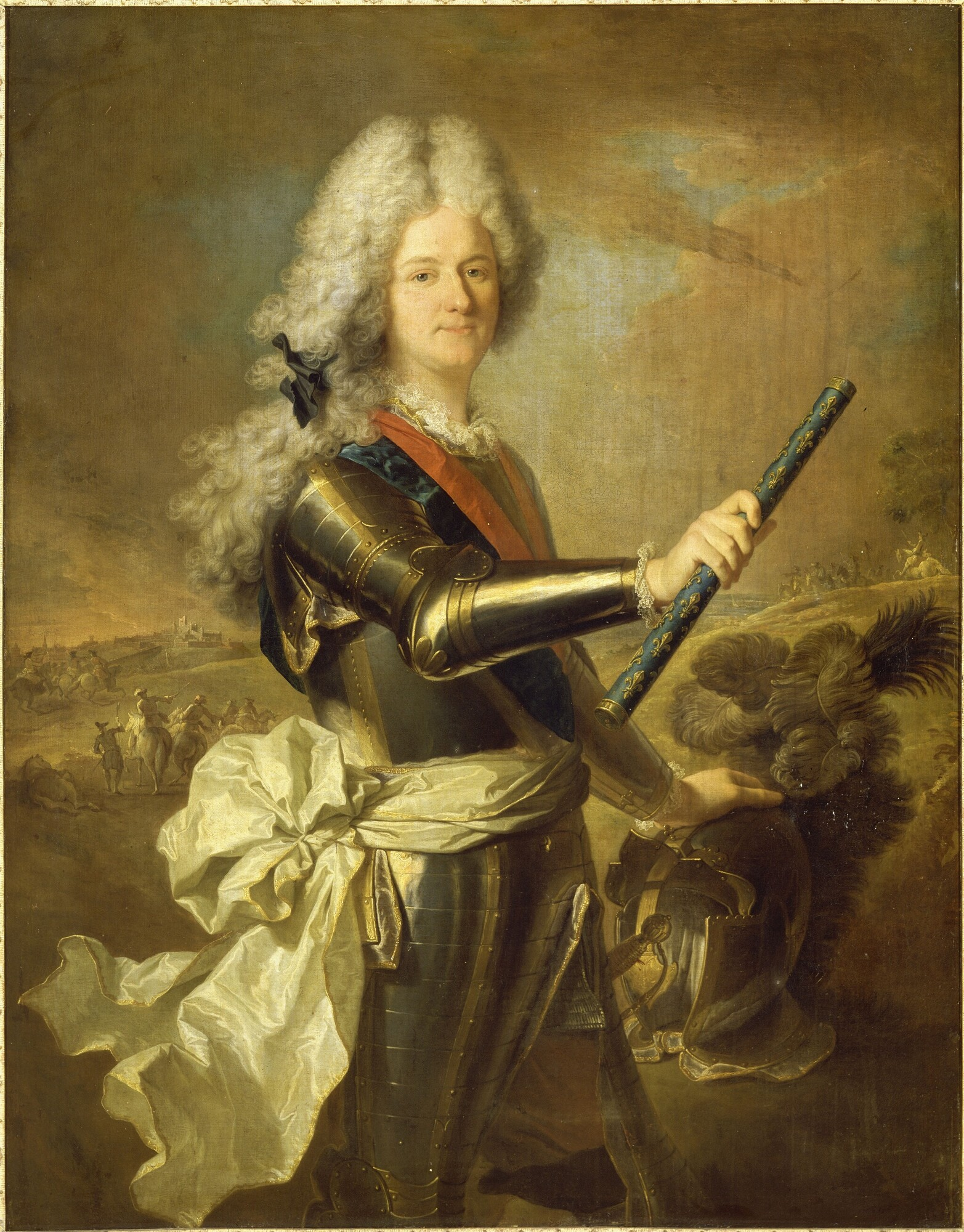
Louis Alexandre, Count of Toulouse

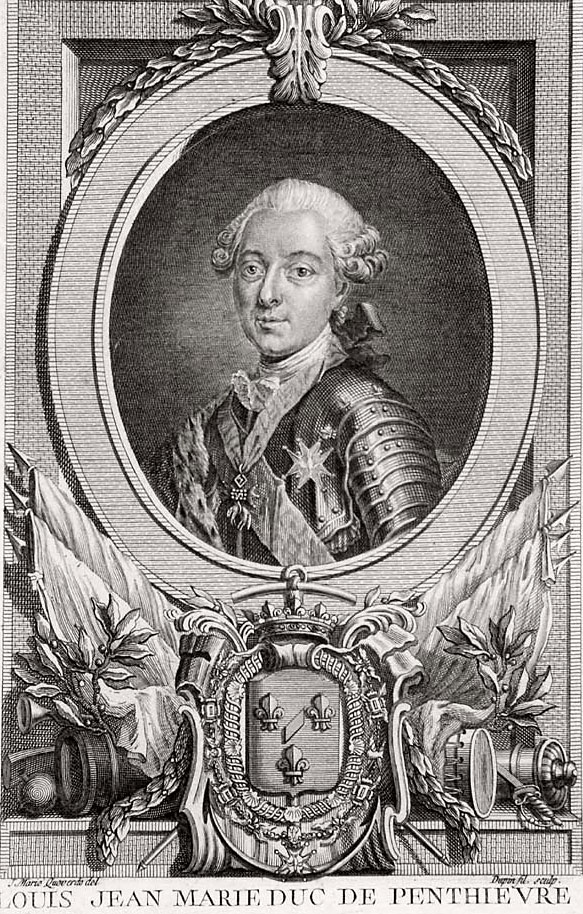
Louis Jean Marie de Bourbon, Duke of Penthièvre

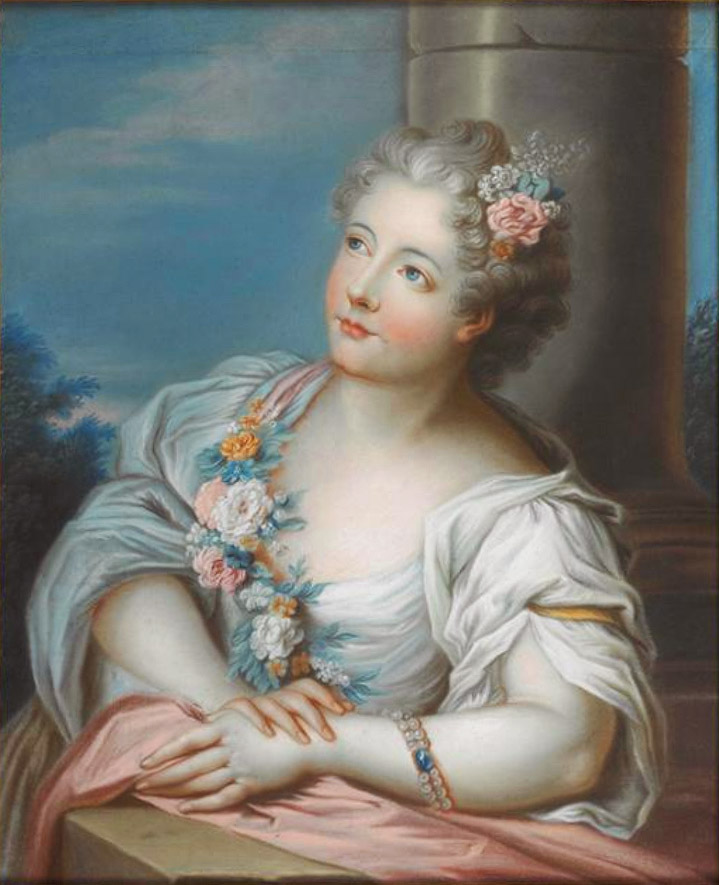
Toulouse's wife, Marie Victoire

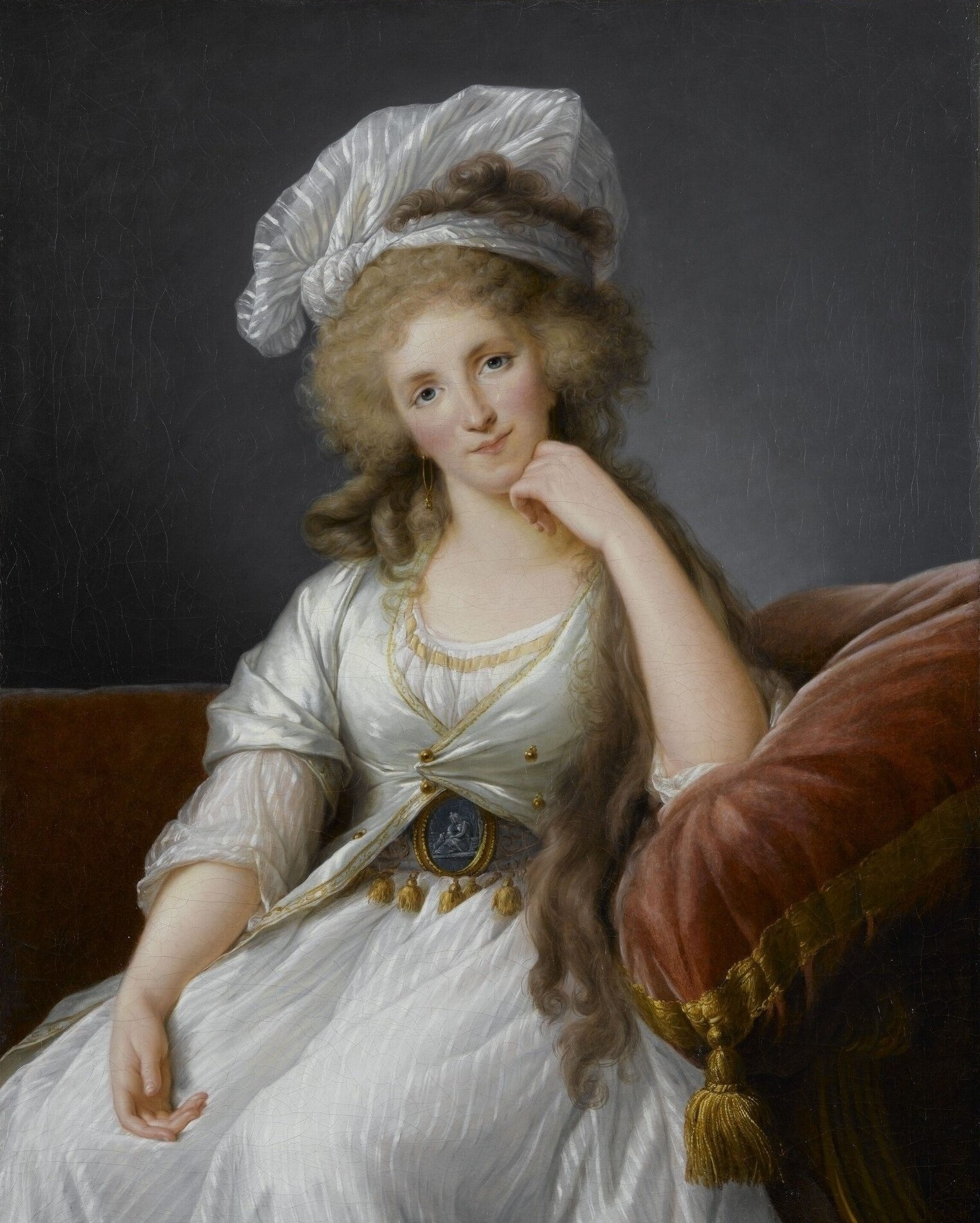
Louise Marie Adélaïde de Bourbon, "Mademoiselle de Penthièvre"
