= Hersilia Separating Romulus and Tatius =

Painting by Guercino

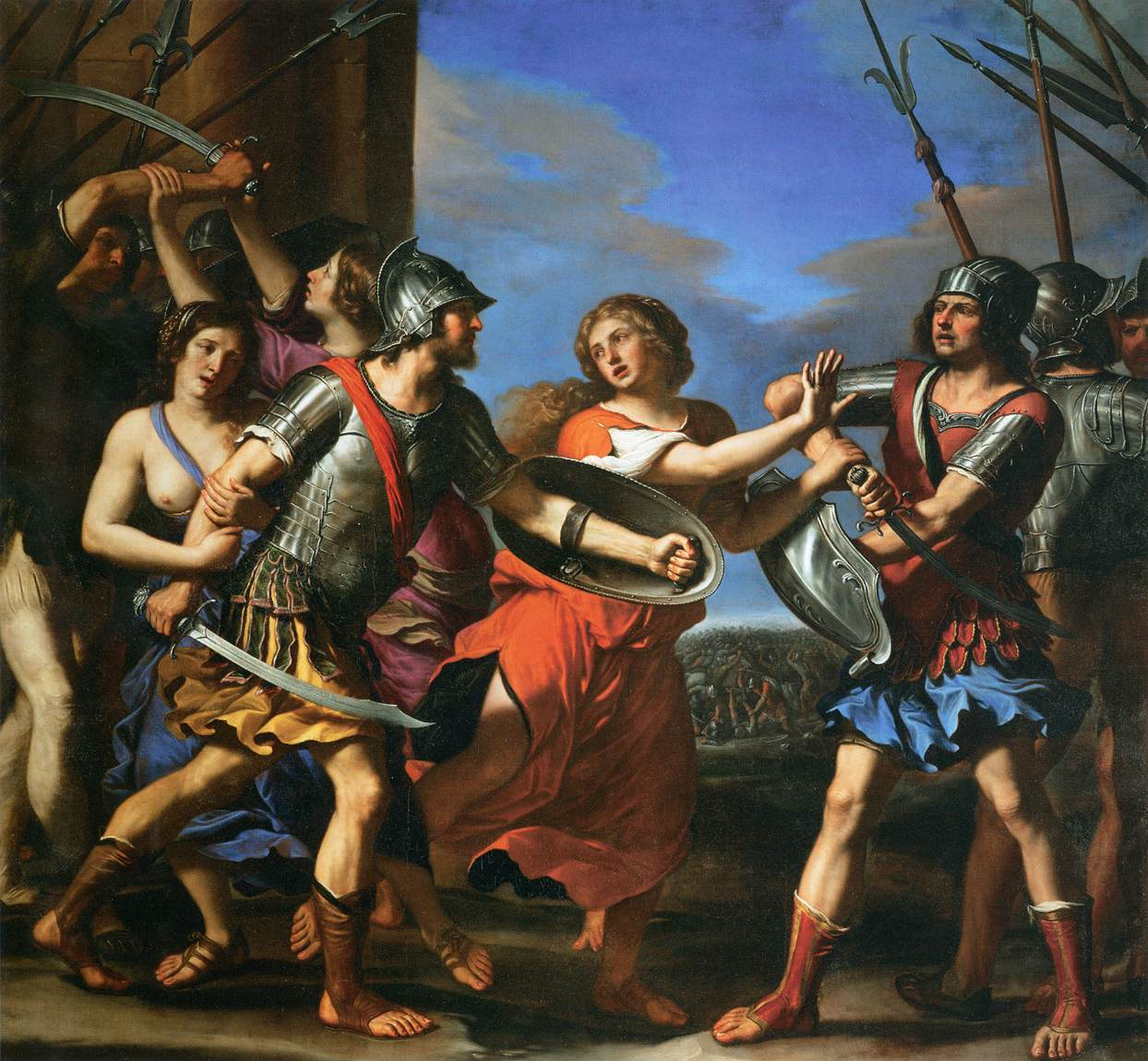
Hersilia Separating Romulus and Tatius (1645) by Guercino

Hersilia Separating Romulus and Tatius or The Battle Between the Romans and the Sabines is a 1645 oil on canvas painting by Guercino, seized by the state during the French Revolution in 1794 and placed in the Louvre, where it still hangs. It shows Hersilia breaking up a battle between her husband Romulus and her Sabine brother Titus Tatius, with two other unnamed women doing similar in the background.

== History ==
It was one of nine works commissioned by Louis Phélypeaux, Seigneur of La Vrillière for the gilded gallery at his new hôtel de La Vrillière in Paris. Hersilia and the hôtel were sold in 1705 to Louis Raulin Rouillé (contrôleur général des Postes), then in 1713 by Rouillé's widow to Louis-Alexandre de Bourbon. They both passed to his son Louis de Bourbon, duc de Penthièvre, from whom they were seized in 1794. A copy of the original has hung in the Galerie dorée since the 19th century.
