= Cato of Utica Bidding Farewell to his Son =

1635 painting

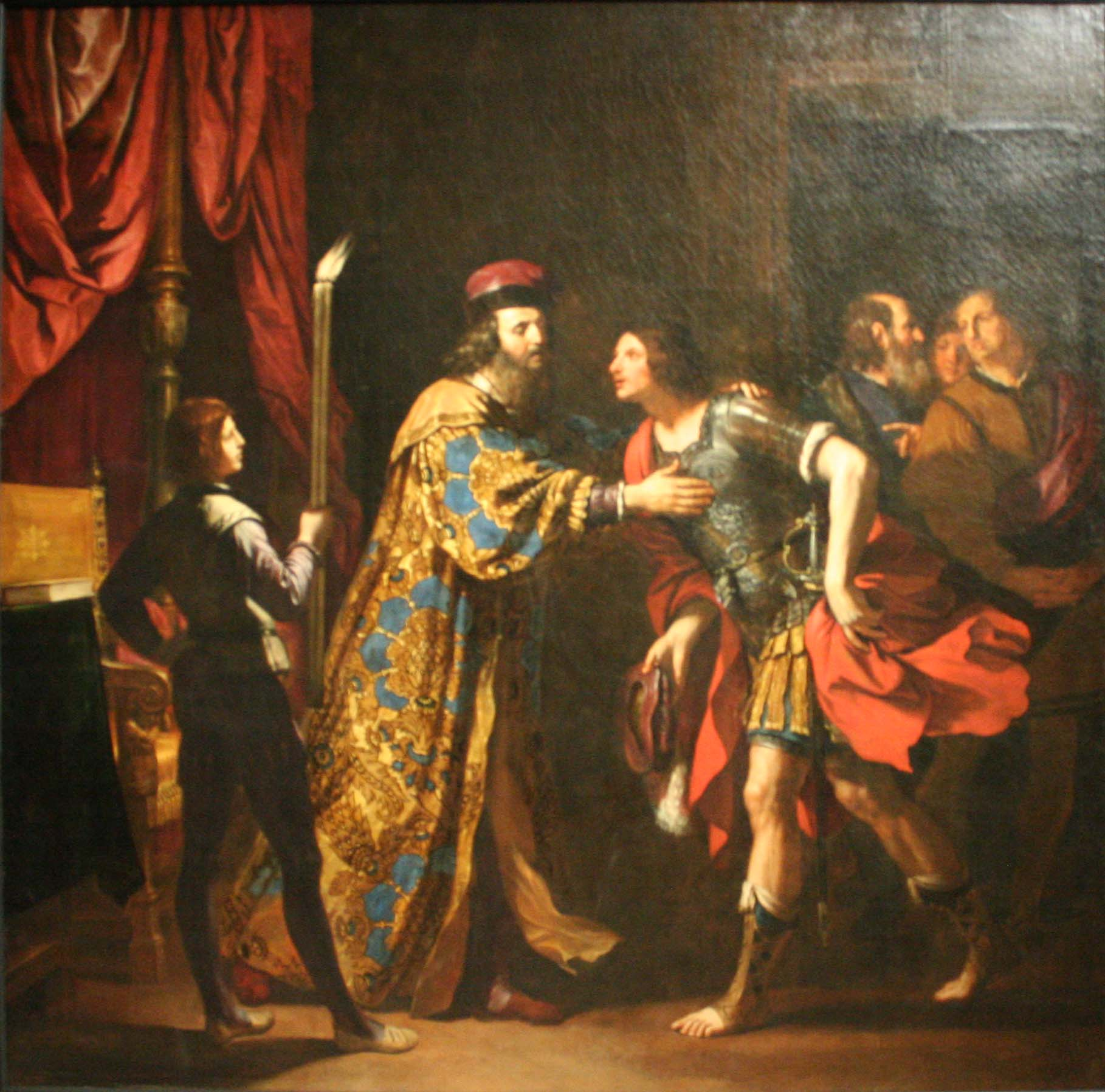

Cato of Utica Bidding Farewell to his Son is an oil painting on canvas executed in 1635 by the Italian painter Guercino, now in the Musée des Beaux-Arts de Marseille since 1872.

It shows the aftermath of Cato the Younger's defeat by Julius Caesar at the Battle of Thapsus as told in Plutarch's Parallel Lives, with Cato breaking off from reading Plato's Dialogue on the Immortality of the Soul to say goodbye to his son just before Cato's suicide. It was one of nine works commissioned by Louis Phélypeaux, Seigneur of La Vrillière for the gilded gallery at his new hôtel de La Vrillière in Paris.
