= Romulus (opera) =

2007 opera by Louis Karchin

Romulus is a 2007 comic opera in one act by Louis Karchin based on an 1854 play by Alexandre Dumas, père; the libretto is by Barnett Shaw, based upon his own translation of the play.

== Recordings ==
- Romulus – Katrina Thurman (Martha), Steven Ebel (Frantz Wolf), Thomas Meglioranza (Celestus), Wilbur Pauley (Mayor Babenhausen); The Washington Square Ensemble, Louis Karchin, Naxos Records
