= Saint Romulus =

Saint Romulus may refer to:

- Romulus of Genoa (fl. 4th century), early Bishop of Genoa
- Romulus of Fiesole (fl. 1st century), patron saint of Fiesole, Italy
- See Donatus, Romulus, Secundian, and 86 Companions for the martyr Romulus
