= Remus (given name) =

Remus is the given name of:

- Remus (born 771 B.C.), Brother of Romulus, mythical co-founder of Rome

== Persons ==
- Remus Cernea (born 1974), Romanian activist
- Remus Dănălache (born 1984), Romanian football goalkeeper
- Remus Koffler (1902–1954), Romanian communist activist
- Remus Opreanu (1844–1908), Romanian jurist and politician
- Remus Opriș (born 1958), Romanian politician and psychiatrist
- Remus Pricopie (born 1970), Romanian Education Minister
- Remus Răduleț (1904–1984), Romanian electrical engineer
- Remus von Woyrsch (1847–1920), Prussian field marshal who fought in World War I

== Fictional characters ==
- Uncle Remus, the fictional title character and narrator of a collection of African American folktales
- Remus Lupin, a character in the Harry Potter novels
- Remus, the protagonist of the Kashubian novel The Life and Adventures of Remus
- Remus Sanders, the personification of "forbidden creativity" from the Sanders Sides web series, played by Thomas Sanders
- Remus, the sister of Romulus in Marvel Comics

== Animals ==
- Remus (direwolf hybrid), a de-extincted hybrid female direwolf-greywolf created by Colossal Biosciences in 2024

== See also ==
- Remus (disambiguation)
