= Moonlit Landscape =

Painting by Guercino

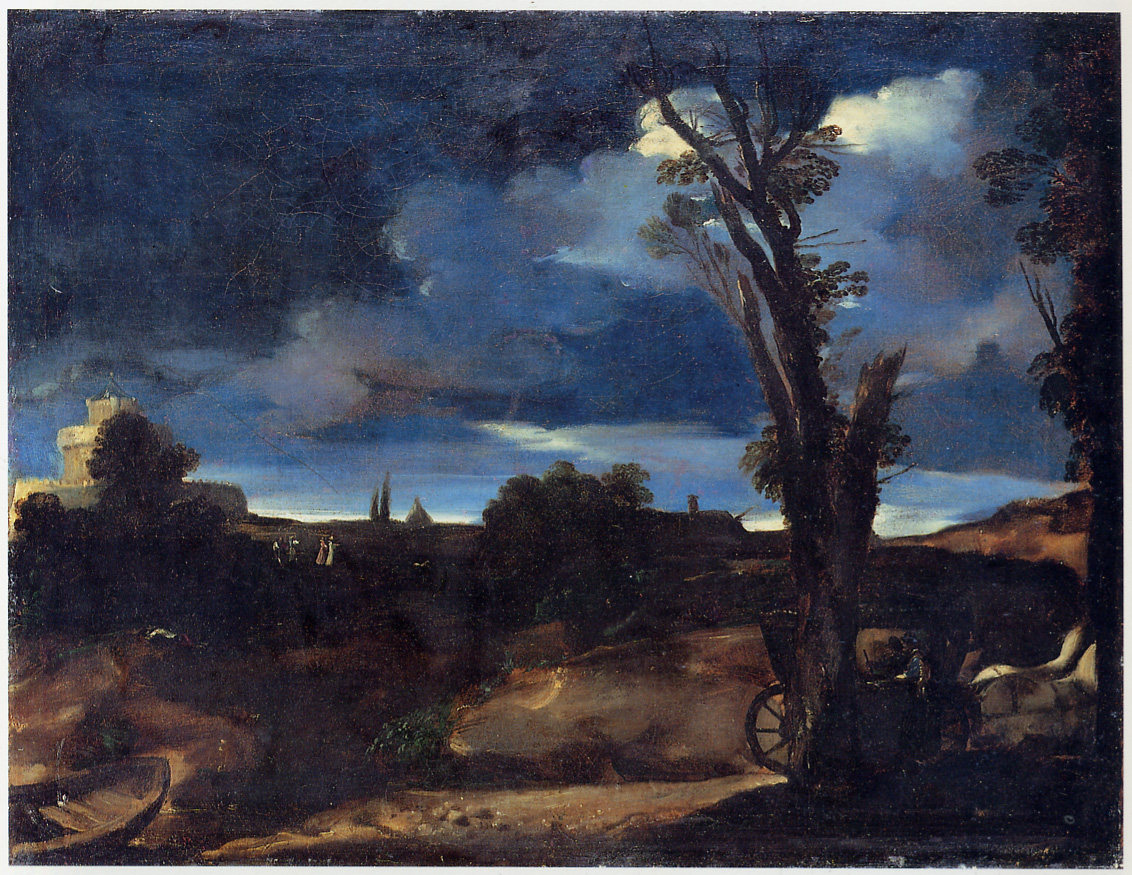
Moonlit Landscape (c. 1616) by Guercino

Moonlit Landscape is a c. 1616 oil-on-canvas landscape painting by the Italian Baroque artist Guercino, a rare instance of pure landscape in his work. It is now in the Nationalmuseum in Stockholm, to which it was donated in 1936 by court official Gösta Stenman via the Nationalmusei Vänner.
