= French ship Romulus =

French ship Romulus may refer to the following ships of the French Navy:

- French ship Romulus (1781), a 44-gun ship of the Royal Navy launched in 1771 and captured by the French
- French ship Romulus (1812), a Téméraire-class 74-gun ship of the line of the French Navy

== See also ==
- HMS Romulus
