= Mount Romulus =

Mountain in Alberta, Canada

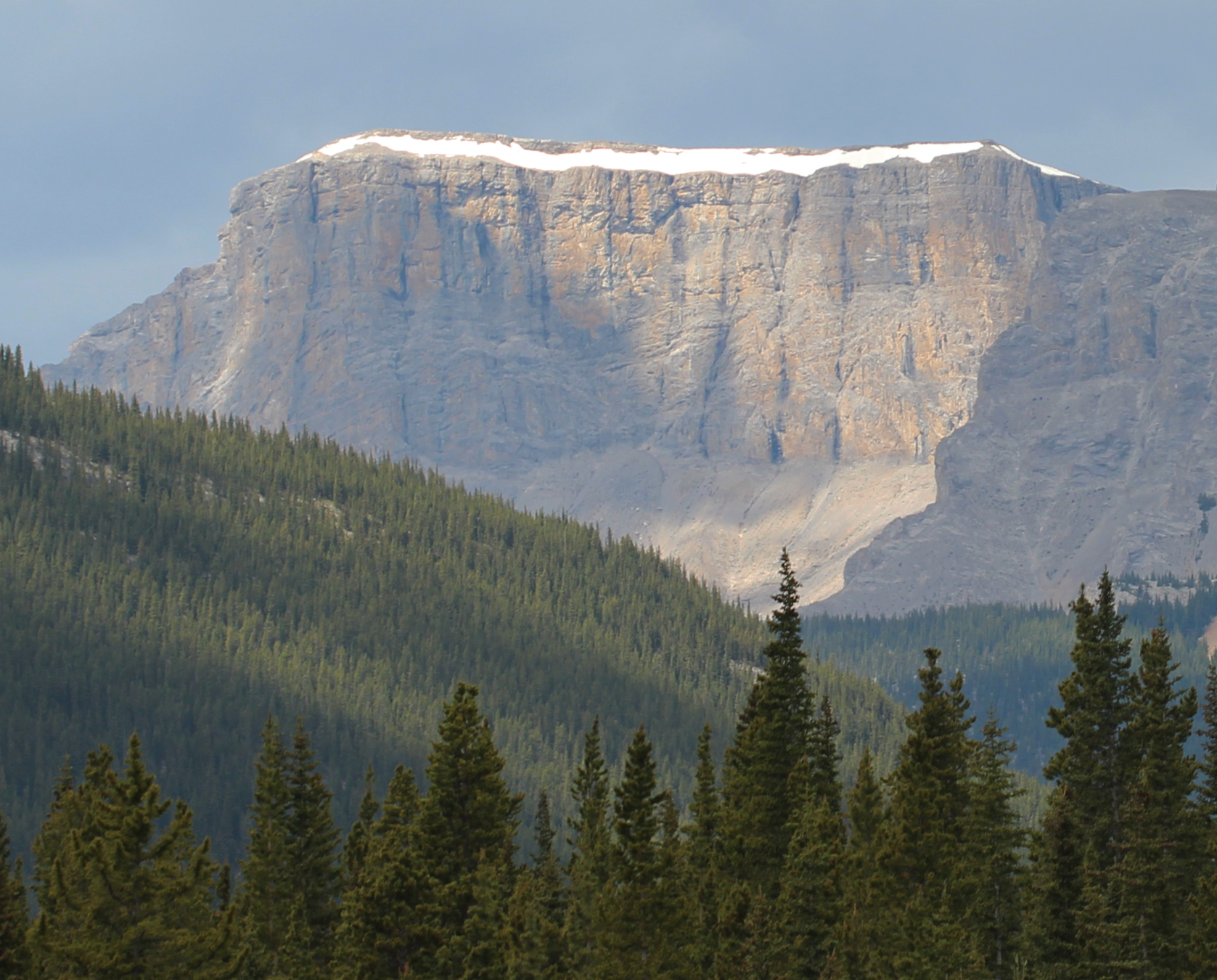
- Mount Romulus, southeast face

Highest point
- Elevation: 2,832 m (9,291 ft)
- Prominence: 394 m (1,293 ft)
- Parent peak: Fisher Peak (3053 m)
- Listing: Mountains of Alberta
- Coordinates: 50°47′20″N 114°59′38″W

Geography
- Location within Alberta Location within Canada
- Location: Elbow-Sheep Wildland Provincial Park; Alberta, Canada
- Parent range: Fisher Range; Canadian Rockies
- Topo map: NTS 82J15 Bragg Creek

Geology
- Rock age: Cambrian

Climbing
- Easiest route: Scramble

Mount Romulus is a 2,832-metre (9,291-foot) mountain summit located in the Little Elbow River Valley of Kananaskis Country in the Canadian Rockies of Alberta, Canada. Weather permitting, the peak is visible from highways southwest of Calgary as it is recognizable by its signature band of snow that forms above the broad southeast cliffs. The mountain is named for Romulus, who along with his twin brother Remus were the mythological founders of Ancient Rome. Mount Remus (2688 m) is situated 2.0 km (1.2 mi) to the east-northeast. The name was officially adopted by the Geographical Names Board of Canada in 1940. Mount Romulus' nearest higher peak is Fisher Peak, 4.0 km (2.5 mi) to the northwest.

== Geology ==
Mount Romulus is composed of sedimentary rock laid down during the Precambrian to Jurassic periods. Formed in shallow seas, this sedimentary rock was pushed east and over the top of younger rock during the Laramide orogeny.

== Climate ==
Based on the Köppen climate classification, Mount Romulus is located in a subarctic climate zone with cold, snowy winters, and mild summers. Temperatures can drop below −20 °C with wind chill factors below −30 °C. In terms of favorable weather, June through September are the best months to climb. Precipitation runoff from the mountain drains into the Little Elbow River, which is a tributary of the Elbow River.

== Gallery ==
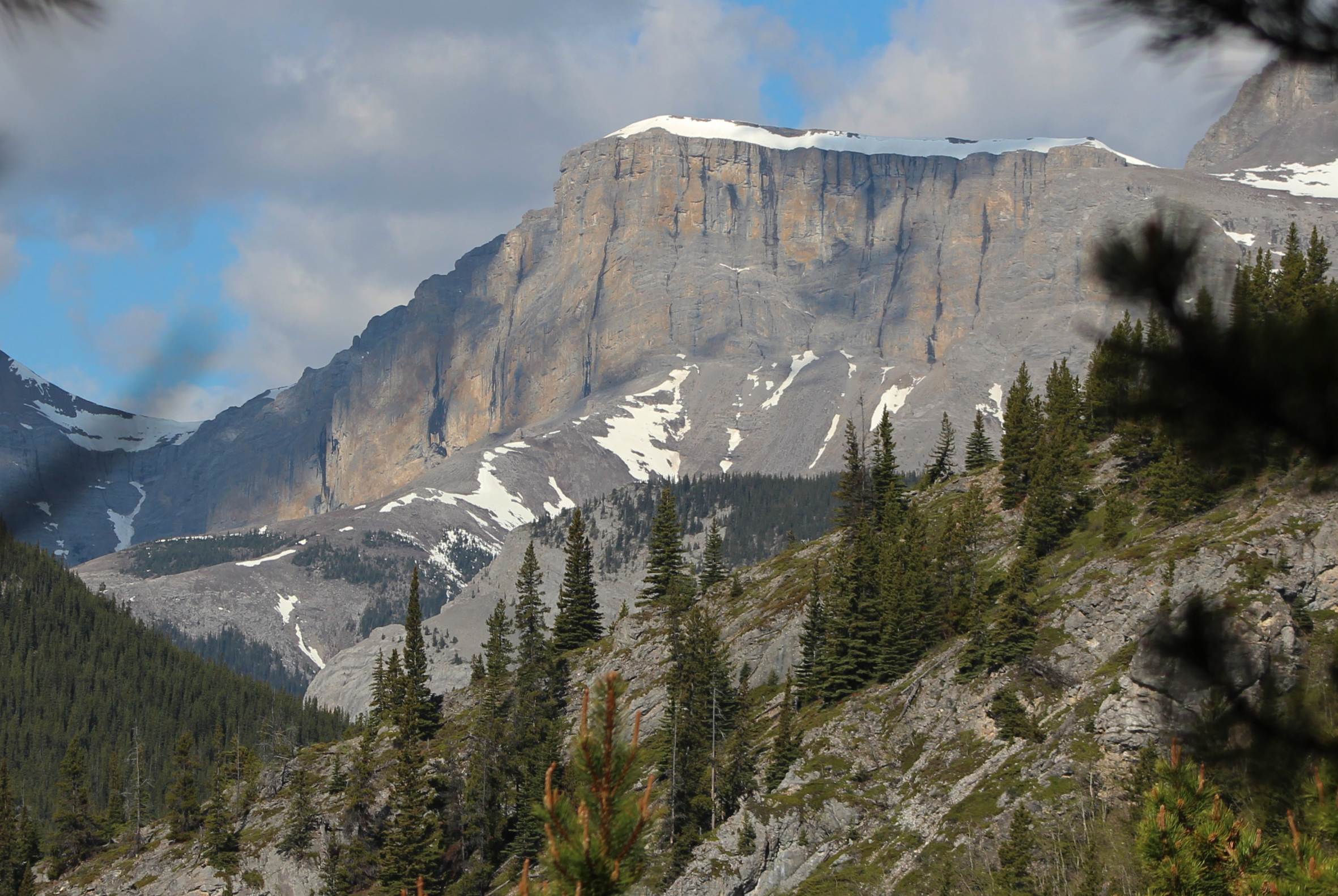

== See also ==
- List of mountains of Canada
- Geology of Alberta
- Scrambles in the Canadian Rockies
