= Romolo =

Romolo is an Italian given name, and may refer to:

- Robert Bellarmine (1542–1621), Saint and Cardinal of the Roman Catholic Church
- Romolo Ferri (1928–2015), Italian Grand Prix motorcycle road racer
- Romolo Gessi (1831–1881), Italian soldier
- Romolo Valli (1925–1980), Italian actor

== See also ==
- Romulus (disambiguation)
- Romolo (Milan Metro), a Line 2 station between Viale Romolo and Largo Alberto Ascari
