= Louis Karchin =

American classical composer

- Born: 1951 (age 74–75); Philadelphia, PA, US
- Education: Harvard University; Eastman School of Music
- Known for: Composing (over 100 works), conducting, teaching
- Style: Classical, modernist, contemporary
- Spouse: Julie Sirota Karchin
- Awards: Guggenheim Fellowship, American Academy of Arts and Letters, National Endowment for the Arts
- Website: Louis Karchin

Louis Karchin (born 1951) is an American composer, conductor and educator. His music spans more than 100 compositions, including three operas, vocal-instrumental song cycles set to texts by a wide range of poets, and orchestral, chamber and solo instrumental pieces. Critics describe Karchin's work as modernist, combining original orchestration, driving energy, and a blend of complexity and approachability, and lyricism and atonality. In the latter regard, his music is often likened to that of the Austrian composer Alban Berg. Nathan Faro of American Record Guide wrote, "Karchin's music is challenging yet accessible, abstract and diffuse yet colorful. It embodies a romantic mode of expression and the structural rigor of serialism, yet often remains light and airy."

Karchin's work has been recognized by the Guggenheim Foundation, American Academy of Arts and Letters and National Endowment for the Arts, among others. Organizations and venues presenting his music have included Carnegie Hall, Tanglewood, Lincoln Center, the Guggenheim Museum, the Center for Contemporary Opera, the Da Capo Chamber Players, Earplay, and the Louisville Orchestra. As a conductor, Karchin has regularly led groups such as the Orchestra of the League of Composers and the Washington Square Ensemble. He is a professor of music at New York University.

== Education and biographical ==
Karchin was born in 1951 and raised in Philadelphia, Pennsylvania. He began learning piano and writing short pieces at age six, and through a public high school program, studied composition with Joseph Castaldo, head of the Philadelphia Musical Academy (later University of the Arts). At the Eastman School of Music, he worked with composers Samuel Adler and Joseph Schwantner, graduating in 1973. During that time he was a Leonard Bernstein Fellow at Tanglewood and received the center's Koussevitzky Composition Prize (1971) as well as the Columbia University Joseph H. Bearns Prize (1972). At Harvard University, he studied with Earl Kim, Leon Kirchner and Fred Lerdahl, earning masters and Ph.D. degrees in 1975 and 1978, respectively. In 1979, Karchin began teaching music at the Arts and Science Department of New York University, where he is a professor of music He oversaw the formation of the department's graduate program in music composition.

Karchin lives in New Jersey with his wife, Julie Sirota Karchin, and daughters, Marisa and Lindsay.

== Composing and critical reception ==
Critics such as Robert Carl and Jack Sullivan suggest that Karchin's music reconciles the harmonic and structural rigor of New York late and post-serial modernism with more contemporary impulses toward neo-romanticism. They point to the composer's balancing of harmonics and vocal and instrumental color against questions of musical form and structure. John Story of Fanfare elaborated, "Karchin's dissonance quotient is relatively high, but it also does not have the relentless sense of disorientation that is associated with the serial school …. [He] deploys a striking and immediately attractive melodic style, rather like Berg." Carl called Karchin "the most natural and non-dogmatically musical" of the contemporary composers associated with mid-century modernism, creating work with a "strong harmonic component that feels fresh, varied, and allows genuine motion, tension and release."

Soloists who have performed Karchin's music include sopranos Jennifer Zetlan and Lucy Shelton, baritone Thomas Meglioranza, violinists Rolf Schulte and Miranda Cuckson, and pianists James Winn, Stephen Gosling, Steven Beck, Stephen Drury and Se-Hee Jin.

=== Early compositions ===
Karchin first received wide recognition for the early compositions "Capriccio" (1977, for violin and seven instruments) and "Songs of John Keats" (1984, soprano and chamber ensemble). The former won a competition prize and recording award from the American Composers Alliance while the latter was recognized by the American Academy of Arts and Letters. Both were performed by the Group for Contemporary Music on the recording Louis Karchin/Michelle Ekizian (1992) and noted by High Performance Review for their clear textures, strong harmonic profiles, timing and economy of gesture.

Critics defined Karchin's compositions of the late 1980s and early 1990s by their combination of forward motion, appealing melodic style (both qualities likened to the work of Beethoven), and atonality. The recording Louis Karchin: Galactic Folds (1997) is representative of this period. Among its works is "Songs of Distance and Light" (1988, soprano and chamber; premiered by the Earplay ensemble), cited by reviewers for its exotic orchestration and deference to the rhythms, flow and moods of the Elizabeth Bishop and Jennifer Rose poems it was set to. "Sonata for Violoncello and Piano" (1990), performed by cellist Fred Sherry and pianist James Winn, was noted for "its rhythmic panache, intensity and variety of attack and pacing," while the two-movement title piece (1992), performed by the New York New Music Ensemble, was deemed a work of "rushing, furious energy."

In the mid-1990s, Karchin produced diverse instrumental compositions ranging from "Rustic Dances" (1995; violin, clarinet and marimba)—an organically shifting piece combining the contemporary and folksy—to the more cohesive, melodic "Sonata da camera" (1995, violin and piano) to "String Quartet #2" (1995), which moved through a series of contrasting variations based on an originating motif. Rhapsody for Orchestra (1996) was commissioned by the Fromm Foundation for the Louisville Orchestra and explored evolving harmonic contexts. In 2001, "Sonata da camera" was selected by the Chamber Music Society of Lincoln Center for performance in its "Great Day in New York" festival representing the city through 52 composers.

=== Vocal works, 1998–present ===
In the late 1990s, Karchin turned more towards vocal writing, beginning with American Visions (1998), a 25-minute song cycle for baritone and chamber ensemble set to two poems by the late Russian poet Yevgeny Yevtushenko. It was commissioned and premiered by the Da Capo Chamber Players and awarded a Hecksher Foundation prize for best new chamber work. Building off visceral textual imagery of the Grand Canyon and Challenger disaster, the composition was described as "an immense musical fresco" of bold declamation and vivid, expansive scoring. It was recorded in a version with orchestra for Karchin's CD To the Sun and Stars (2014) with baritone Thomas Meglioranza, who also performed the vocal-instrumental cycle The Gods of Winter (2006). Set to somber lyrics of personal tragedy by American poet Dana Gioia, the latter work's score features martial expressions, a haunting, hymn-like chorale, and emotional tones ranging from suspense to reproach.

Karchin's recording Orpheus and Other Vocal Works (2005) contains the extended title work, as well as early-2000s songs for piano and soprano ("To the Sun," "Deux Poems de Mallarmé") or baritone ("Memory," "Echoes"), whose vocal lines were said to "chart a Bergian course between lyricism and atonality." The 25-minute masque Orpheus (2003, for baritone, instrumental ensemble and dancers) was based on a modern reimagining of the ancient myth by poet Stanley Kunitz. Commissioned by the Barlow Endowment for the Earplay ensemble, it premiered at San Francisco's Yerba Buena Center for the Arts, and in New York, at the Skirball Center. Critic Jules Langert wrote of the premiere, "[t]he music seemed in constant flux, creating strong, richly textured sonorities … and brilliant splashes of color; this Orpheus floated on an incandescent fabric of sound."

In 2007, Karchin's first opera, Romulus (1990/2005), stage-premiered at the Guggenheim Museum with Katrina Thurman, Steven Ebel and Thomas Meglioranza in feature roles and Karchin conducting. The one-act, 70-minute chamber work was based on the same-titled, 1854 farce by Alexandre Dumas, père, about two absent-minded, scholarly bachelors whose household is upended by the appearance of an infant in a basket. Critics noted the opera's modernist invention, seamless flow and theatrical instincts. Steve Smith of The New York Times called it "angular and chromatic" music that "seemed to unfurl in a ceaseless strand of gentle lyricism, filled with timbral variety and punctuated by passages of puckish humor that deftly mirrored the stage action." In a Fanfare review of the original-cast recording (2011), Robert Carl singled out the music's variety, sonority, "glittering orchestration" and "close, moment-by-moment reading of the thoughts and emotions of the characters."

Jane Eyre (2015) was Karchin's most ambitious project to date: a full-length, three-act opera, based on the Charlotte Brontë novel, which the Center for Contemporary Opera premiered in 2016 with soprano Jennifer Zetlan and tenor Ryan MacPherson in lead roles. The New Criterion deemed the work "bold in its aim, unblushing about opera's traditions," noting a theatrical mastery embodied in the symphonic storytelling and a compressed libretto (by Diane Osen) balancing plainspokenness and Brontë's distinctive syntax. Others pointed to complexities masked by the opera's accessibility: a blend of atonality, original orchestration, Straussian restlessness, and well-placed selections and quotations of period music. James T. North of Fanfare wrote of the 2019 original-cast recording, the music "is complex and harmoniously adventurous, but admits a font of grand lyricism most appropriate to [Brontë's novel] … Karchin's orchestration is colorful, yet dark enough to limn Jane's bleaker moments."

Other vocal works by Karchin include "Four Songs of Poems of Seamus Heaney" (2013/2019) and "Tribute to the Angels" (2020), which appears on the composer's same-titled CD (2025). The Heaney piece forms part of the longer Ancient Scenes (2014), a contemporary work featuring four upper-register vocal sections and three urgent instrumental movements; Karchin conducted its 2019 Merkin Hall performance by soprano Marisa Karchin and the Da Capo Chamber Players. "Tribute to the Angels" (2020, commissioned for soprano Jennifer Zetlan and the Talea Ensemble) combines eight texts from the poet H.D.'s (Hilda Doolittle) Trilogy with animated winds and percussion and soaring vocals to explore themes of spiritual metamorphosis and reconciliation. In 2026, Karchin premiered selections of his third opera, Roman Fever (2026)—a one-act chamber work based on the Edith Wharton short story—at Manhattan's Grace Church in collaboration with The Mount, Wharton’s ancestral estate and cultural center.

=== Instrumental works, 2004–present ===
Karchin's recordings Dark Mountains/Distant Lights (2019) and Five Compositions (2020) gather many of his instrumental compositions written between 2004 and 2019. Reviewers characterized the works on the former CD—composed for solo or accompanied violin, oboe and piano and performed by Miranda Cuckson, Steven Beck and Jacqueline Leclair—as "alternately tart and rhapsodic," challenging and playful (e.g., the duets "Rhapsody for Violin and Piano," 2005; "Dreamscape," 2016; and "Reflections," 2017). Five Compositions contains four chamber works that highlight Karchin's interest in discovering new sounds and instrumental combinations, which are anchored by the large, three-movement Chamber Symphony (2009). The symphony premiered at Merkin Hall in 2010 and was performed at Tanglewood in 2011. New York Times critic Vivien Schweitzer called it "a kaleidoscopic work," featuring a first movement punctuated by "rippling waves of sound … rich with intriguing timbres," a slower, spare, nocturnal second movement, and high-spirited, modified rondo finale. The chamber works include an intimate, nuanced piece for violin and harp, "Barcarole Variations" (2015, written for Renée and Susan Jolles), and the romantic solo piano composition, "Rochester Celebration" (2017).

Keyboards/Winds (2023) collects compositions for those instruments written or revised during the 2020–22 Covid-19 pandemic. The keyboard works include: "Sonata-Fantasia" (2020; solo piano, written for Stephen Drury), a single-movement piece of interconnected sections that emulate four-movement symphonic form and range in emotion from lively to reflective; "A Jersey Reverie on New York Notes" (2018, solo piano), a lyrical 80th birthday tribute to composer Charles Wuorinen inspired by his most acclaimed work; and "Processions" (2007/2020; solo organ, written for Carson Cooman), which builds from a solemn opening to a majestic climax. "Quintet for Winds" (2021, written for Windscape) is an ebullient, four-movement piece offering experimental sounds and unexpected juxtapositions and textures.

Other larger instrumental works include the chamber piece "As the Circle Opens to Infinity" (2018), written for ensemble mise-en; "Trio for violin, cello, and piano" (2019, performed by the Horszowski Trio), which was likened to "Schumann's light, flowery, fragmentary style seen through a more abstract, post-serialist lens;" and "Incantations and Dances" (2023, chamber sextet), a lighter work with discernible dance references, such as a minuet and hoedown.

== Conducting and administrative activities ==
Karchin has been active as a conductor and organizer of new music events since his student days. In 1975, he co-founded the Harvard Group for New Music with Paul Salerni, which serves as the school's primary forum for presenting works by graduate student composers. In 1977–78, he studied conducting with Boris Goldovsky and Leon Barzin. Karchin was invited to join the League of Composers-International Society for Contemporary Music (ISCM) in 1979, and served as its president from 1981 to 1983. The following year, he co-founded the Chamber Players of the League-ISCM and frequently conducted performances by the ensemble at venues such as Merkin Hall and Weill Hall.

In 1986, Karchin became co-director of the Washington Square Contemporary Music Society with composer Brian Fennelly; since 2015 he has directed on his own. In 2003, the society formed the Washington Square Ensemble, a resident group that he has regularly conducted. He led the group in its accompaniment of his opera, Romulus, at the Guggenheim Museum (2007) and in the premiere of his Chamber Symphony (Merkin Hall, 2010).

In 2009, Karchin co-founded the Orchestra of the League of Composers with League president David Gordon and flutist Sue Ann Kahn, serving since as its music director and principal conductor. He conducted the orchestra's inaugural performance at the Miller Theater, Columbia University the same year. New York Times critic Anthony Tomassini wrote of the debut, the orchestra was "conducted expertly [and] sounded terrific in this varied and demanding program," which included an "arresting performance" of Elliott Carter's song cycle, In the Distances of Sleep (2006), and the premiere of Charles Wuorinen’s Synaxis.

== Recognition ==
Karchin's music has been recognized with a Guggenheim Fellowship (2011) and awards from the American Academy of Arts and Letters (2012, 2001, 1985), National Endowment for the Arts, Aaron Copland Fund, and New Jersey State Council on the Arts, among others. He has received commissions from organizations including the Serge Koussevitzky, Fromm, Barlow and Barnes Foundations. He has been awarded composer residencies by MacDowell, Yaddo and several higher learning institutions, among others.

In 2018, the Eastman School of Music initiated an archive of Karchin’s manuscripts and career, and in 2022, honored him with its Centennial Award for lifetime achievement in music.

== Selected compositions ==
Karchin's music is published by Wise Music-Edition Peters and the American Composers Alliance.

- Roman Fever (2026), an opera in one act based on the Edith Wharton short story
- Incantations and Dances (2023), chamber sextet
- Quintet for Winds (2021)
- Sonata-Fantasia (2020), solo piano
- Tribute to the Angels (2020), soprano and ensemble
- As the Circle Opens to Infinity (2018), chamber
- A Jersey Reverie on New York Notes (2018), solo piano
- Rochester Celebration (2017), solo piano
- Barcarole Variations (2015), violin and harp
- Jane Eyre (2015), an opera in three acts based on the Charlotte Brontë novel
- Ancient Scenes (2014), soprano and chamber
- Four Songs on Poems of Seamus Heaney (2012), soprano and chamber ensemble
- Chamber Symphony (2009)
- Processions (2007/2020), solo organ
- The Gods of Winter (2006), baritone and chamber ensemble. Poetry by Dana Gioia.
- Chesapeake Festival Overture (2006) for orchestra
- Rhapsody (2005), violin and piano
- Matrix and Dream (2004), soprano and piano. Poetry of Paul Auster.
- Orpheus (2003), a masque for baritone, chamber ensemble and dancers. Poetry by Stanley Kunitz.
- To the Sun (2003), Orphic Hymn circa 300 A.D., for soprano and piano
- To the Stars (2003), Orphic Hymn circa 300 A.D., for a cappella chorus
- American Visions: Two Songs on Poems of Yevgeny Yevtushenko (1998), Heckscher Foundation Award, 1999.
- Rhapsody for Orchestra (1996)
- String Quartet No. 2 (1995)
- Rustic Dances (1995), violin, clarinet and marimba
- Sonata da Camera (1995), violin and piano
- Galactic Folds (1992), chamber ensemble
- Romulus (1990, rev. 2005), an opera in one act based on a play by Alexandre Dumas père. Prizewinner, National Opera Association, 1990.
- Sonata for Violoncello and Piano (1990)
- Songs of Distance and Light (1988), soprano and chamber ensemble. Poetry by Elizabeth Bishop and Jennifer Rose.
- Songs of John Keats (1984), soprano and chamber ensemble
- Capriccio (1977), violin and seven instruments. First prize winner, New Music Consort Competition, 1981

== Selected recordings ==
- Tribute to the Angels: Louis Karchin Vol. 4 (Bridge 9612)
- Keyboard/Winds: Music of Louis Karchin (Bridge 9586)
- Five Compositions (2009-2019) (Bridge 9543)
- Jane Eyre (Naxos 8.669042-43)
- Dark Mountains/Distant Lights (New Focus FCR225)
- To the Sun and Stars (Bridge 9437)
- Romulus (Naxos 8.669030)
- Matrix: Music of Louis Karchin (Albany Records; Troy 895)
- Orpheus and Other Vocal Works (Albany Records; Troy 770)
- American Visions New World Records (NW-80583)
- Music of Louis Karchin New World/CRI (NWCR739)
- Louis Karchin/Michelle Ekizian (New World Records 80425)
