= Camillus Handing the Falerian Schoolmaster over to his Pupils =

Painting by Nicolas Poussin

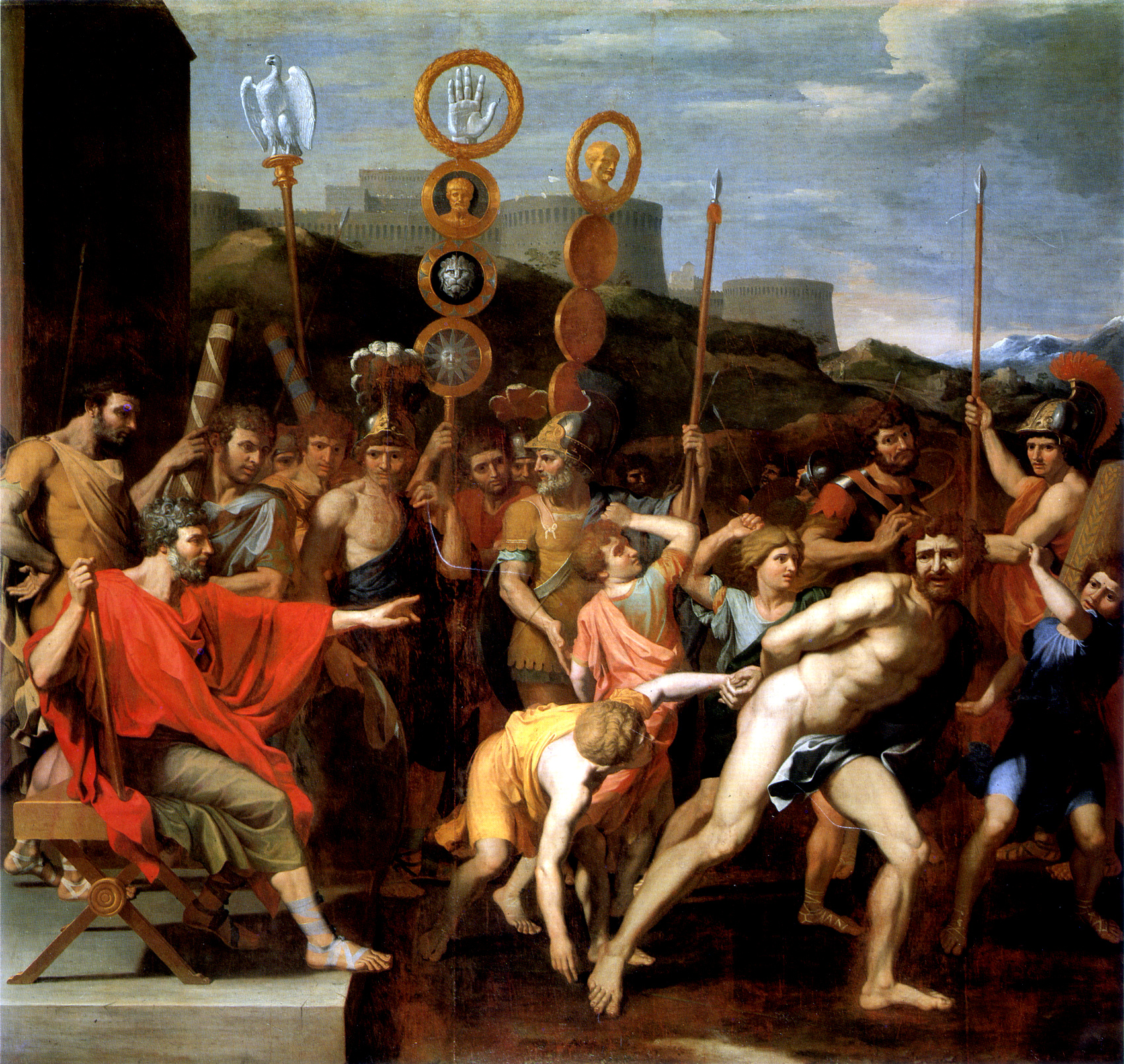
- Artist: Nicolas Poussin
- Year: 1637
- Medium: oil on canvas
- Dimensions: 252 cm × 265 cm (99 in × 104 in)
- Location: Louvre, Paris

Camillus Handing the Falerian Schoolmaster over to his Pupils is an oil on canvas painting by Nicolas Poussin, from 1637. It is held in the Louvre, in Paris, since its seizure for the state in 1794.

== History and description ==
It was one of nine works commissioned by Louis Phélypeaux, Seigneur of La Vrillière for the gilded gallery at his new hôtel de La Vrillière in Paris. Henri Sauval accounted Camillus the finest of the set. Camillus and the hôtel were sold in 1705 to Louis Raulin Rouillé (contrôleur général des Postes), then in 1713 by Rouillé's widow to Louis-Alexandre de Bourbon. They both passed to his son Louis de Bourbon, duc de Penthièvre, from whom they were seized in 1794.

It shows a scene from the capture of Falerii in Chapter 10 of Camillus, one of the Parallel Lives by Plutarch, in which Marcus Furius Camillus punishes a Falerian schoolmaster who hoped to gain favour by handing over his pupils to the Romans besieging the city.

Poussin said he painted it "in a severe manner, as is reasonable considering the subject which is heroic". The preparatory drawings for the painting show how the painter was first interested in integrating the foreground characters: Marcus Furius Camillus in his praetorium, the lictor standing behind him, the schoolchildren and the fallen master.

This subject is found in earlier paintings, but with variations on the choice of the place of each element. In Poussin's painting, Camillus is depicted in the foreground, on the left and in profile, and the children are also in the foreground, on the right with the schoolmaster. Two lictors, with lance in hand, stand behind Camillus. Poussin's choices seem to have been inspired by an illustration of the work by Plutarch (Latin version of 1516). According to Otto Grautoff, Poussin would have been more inspired by the iconographic depiction of the captive Timoclea brought before Alexander, painted by Domenichino (c. 1615).

== See also ==
- List of paintings by Nicolas Poussin
