= Jane Eyre (Karchin) =

Jane Eyre is a 2016 opera by Louis Karchin to a libretto by Diane Osen after the 1847 novel by Charlotte Brontë.

== Roles ==
- Jane Eyre – soprano
- Mr Rochester – tenor
- Roderick Ingram/St. John Rivers – baritone
- Blanche Ingram – soprano
- Diana Rivers/Mrs. Ingram – soprano
- Mr. Mason/Mr. Briggs – baritone
- Mr. Wood – bass

== Recording ==
- Jennifer Zetlan (Jane Eyre), Ryan MacPherson (Mr Rochester), Tom Meglioranza (Roderick Ingram / St. John Rivers), Katrina Thurman (Blanche Ingram), Jessica Thompson (Diana / Mrs. Ingram), Adam Cannedy (Mr. Mason / Mr. Briggs), David Salsbery Fry (Mr. Wood) Orchestra of the League of Composers, Louis Karchin, Naxos 2CD 2019
