= Romulus and Remus Taken in by Faustulus =

Painting by Pietro da Cortona

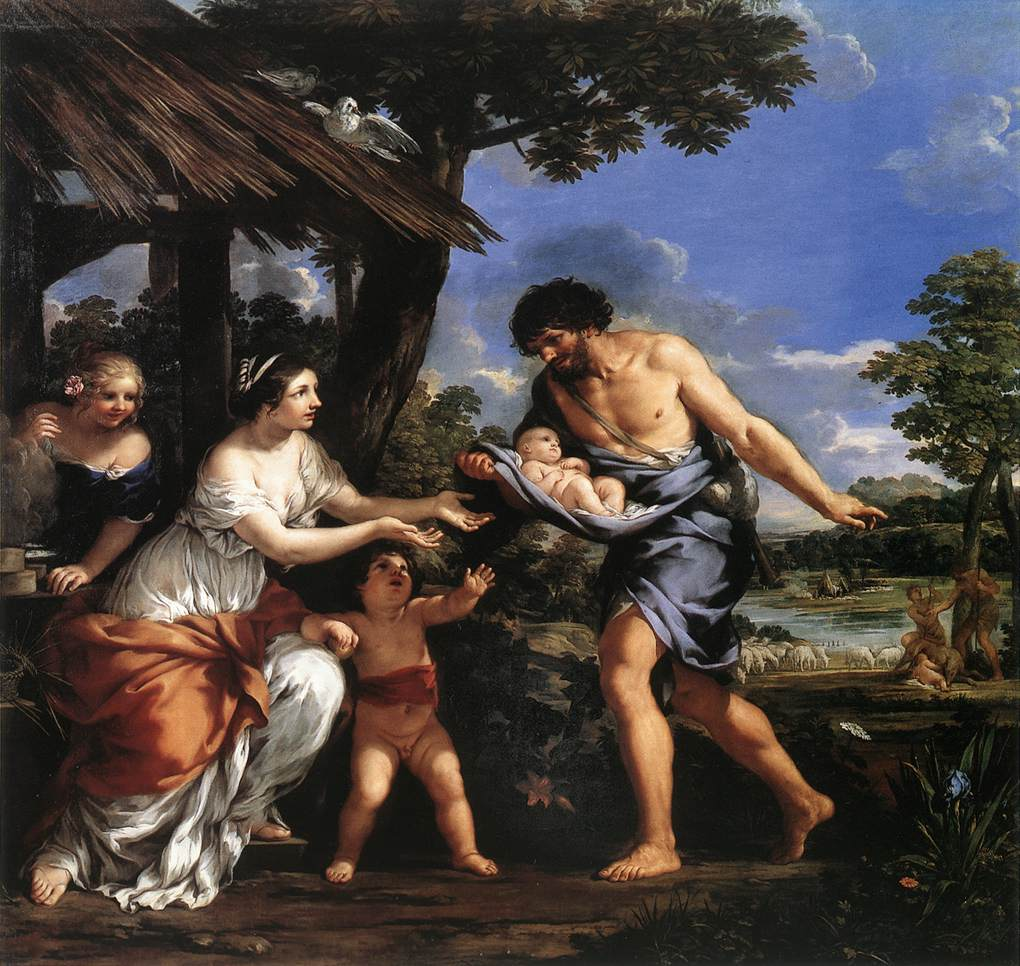
Romulus and Remus Taken in by Faustulus (c. 1643) by Pietro da Cortona

Romulus and Remus Taken in by Faustulus (also known as Faustulus Entrusting Romulus and Remus to Larentia, Romulus and Remus Sheltered by Faustulus or Remus Discovered) is an oil on canvas painting by Pietro da Cortona, created c. 1643. It is held in the Louvre, in Paris. It is one of three works by him and six by other artists commissioned by Louis Phélypeaux, Seigneur of La Vrillière for the gilded gallery at his new hôtel de La Vrillière in Paris.

Romulus and Remus and the hôtel were sold in 1705 to Louis Raulin Rouillé (contrôleur général des Postes), then in 1713 by Rouillé's widow to Louis-Alexandre de Bourbon. They both passed to his son Louis de Bourbon, duc de Penthièvre, from whom they were seized by the French revolutionary state in 1794.
