= Elizabeth Mannion =

American operatic mezzo-soprano

Elizabeth Mannion is an American operatic mezzo-soprano who has performed at opera houses throughout the world. A celebrated voice teacher, Mannion has served on the music faculties of the University of Michigan, Indiana University, Florida State University, Bowling Green State University, the University of Texas at Austin, and the University of California, Santa Barbara. She has also served on the faculty and worked as a performing artist at both the Aspen Music Festival and the Interlochen Center for the Arts. Many of her students have gone on to have successful singing careers, including opera legend Jessye Norman, baritone Thomas Meglioranza .

== Sources ==
- Darnell, C. P., "On stage with the Music Department", Alcalde, Vol. 71, No. 4, March–April 1983, p. 11. ISSN 1535-993X
