= Mount Howard (Alberta) =

Mountain in the Fisher Range of the Canadian Rockies, located in Calgary, Alberta

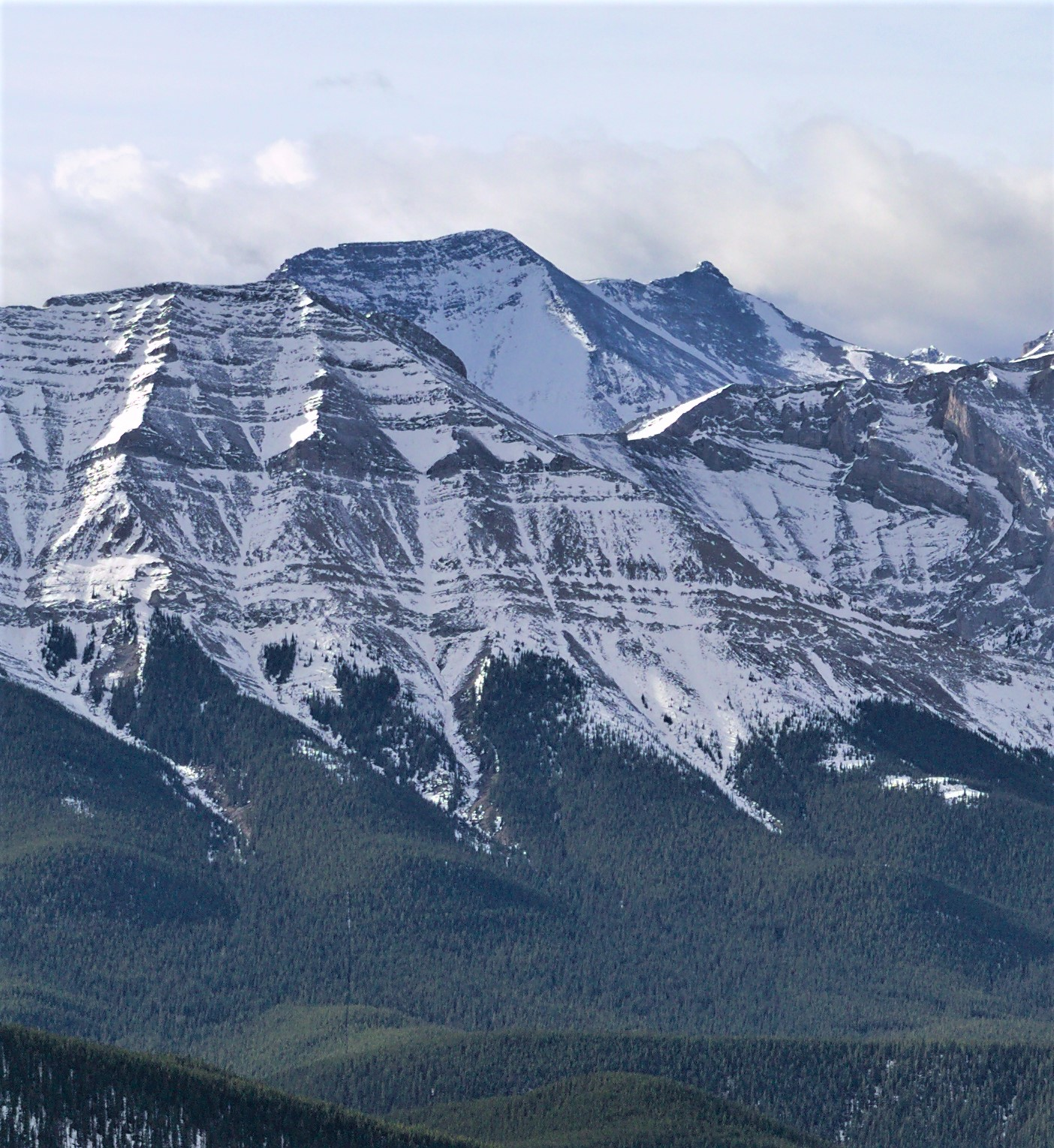
- Mount Howard behind Nihahi Ridge

Highest point
- Elevation: 2,777 m (9,111 ft)
- Prominence: 178 m (584 ft)
- Parent peak: Fisher Peak (3,053 m)
- Isolation: 5.03 km (3.13 mi)
- Listing: Mountains of Alberta
- Coordinates: 50°50′56″N 114°59′00″W

Naming
- Etymology: Terrence "Ted" Howard

Geography
- Location within Kananaskis Improvement District Location within Alberta
- Country: Canada
- Province: Alberta
- Protected area: Elbow-Sheep Wildland Provincial Park
- Parent range: Fisher Range; Canadian Rockies
- Topo map: NTS 82J15 Bragg Creek

Geology
- Rock age: Cambrian
- Rock type: Sedimentary rock

Climbing
- Easiest route: Scrambling via North Ridge

Mount Howard is a 2,777-metre (9,111-foot) mountain summit located 68 km (42 mi) west-southwest of Calgary in Kananaskis Country of Alberta, Canada. Mount Howard is the fourth-highest peak in the Fisher Range which is a subrange of the Canadian Rockies. The nearest higher neighbor is Fisher Peak, 5.03 km (3.13 mi) to the southwest. Precipitation runoff from the mountain drains into Nihahi Creek and Canyon Creek which are tributaries of the Elbow River. Topographic relief is modest as the summit rises 777 metres (2,549 ft) above Canyon Creek in approximately 2 km (1.2 mi).

== Etymology ==
The mountain is named after Terrence "Ted" Howard (1882–1962), Elbow District Forest Ranger for 20 years (1917—1937) with the Alberta Forest Service. The son of a British Army Officer and himself a World War I veteran with Canada's 82nd Battalion, Ted Howard had emigrated to Alberta and homesteaded in the Blackie area. The toponym was officially adopted by the Geographical Names Board of Canada on December 12, 1939.

== Geology ==
Mount Howard is composed of sedimentary rock laid down during the Precambrian to Jurassic periods. Formed in shallow seas, this sedimentary rock was pushed east and over the top of younger rock during the Laramide orogeny.

== Climate ==
Based on the Köppen climate classification, Mount Howard is located in a subarctic climate zone with cold, snowy winters, and mild summers. Winter temperatures can drop below −20 °C with wind chill factors below −30 °C. The months June through September offer the most favorable weather for climbing the peak.

== See also ==
- Geography of Alberta
