= Mount Remus =

Mountain in Alberta, Canada

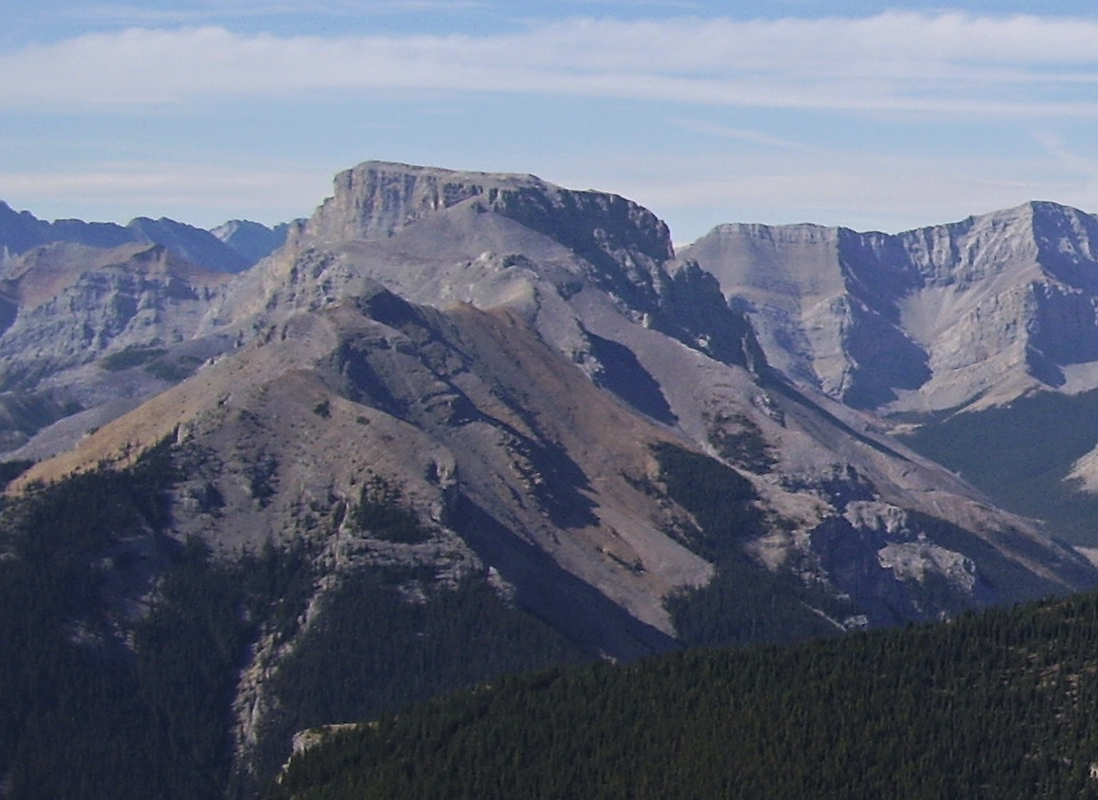
- Mount Remus seen from Nihahi Ridge

Highest point
- Elevation: 2,688 m (8,819 ft)
- Prominence: 341 m (1,119 ft)
- Parent peak: Mount Romulus (2832 m)
- Listing: Mountains of Alberta
- Coordinates: 50°47′41″N 114°58′18″W

Geography
- Location within Alberta Location within Canada
- Location: Elbow-Sheep Wildland Park; Alberta, Canada
- Parent range: Fisher Range; Canadian Rockies
- Topo map: NTS 82J15 Bragg Creek

Climbing
- Easiest route: Scrambling

Mount Remus is a 2,688-metre (8,819-foot) mountain summit located in the Little Elbow River Valley of Kananaskis Country in the Canadian Rockies of Alberta, Canada. The mountain is named for Remus, who along with his twin brother Romulus were the mythological founders of Ancient Rome. The name was officially adopted by the Geographical Names Board of Canada in 1940. Mount Remus' nearest higher peak is Mount Romulus, 2.0 km (1.2 mi) to the west-southwest.

== Geology ==
Mount Remus is composed of sedimentary rock laid down during the Precambrian to Jurassic periods. Formed in shallow seas, this sedimentary rock was pushed east and over the top of younger rock during the Laramide orogeny.

== Climate ==
Based on the Köppen climate classification, Mount Remus is located in a subarctic climate with cold, snowy winters, and mild summers. Temperatures can drop below −20 °C with wind chill factors below −30 °C. In terms of favorable weather, June through September are the best months to climb. Precipitation runoff from the mountain drains into the Little Elbow River, which is a tributary of the Elbow River.

== See also ==
- List of mountains in the Canadian Rockies
- Geology of Alberta
