= Romulus (Dumas play) =

1854 play by Alexandre Dumas

Romulus is a play by Alexandre Dumas, père, first produced with success at the Théâtre-Français on January 13, 1854. Dumas had written it several years earlier, possibly in collaboration with Paul Bocage and Octave Feuillet. The play concerns two philosophers, Dr. Celestus and Dr. Wolf, a disciple of Leibnitz. The American composer Louis Karchin used it for his 2007 opera of the same name.
