= Uncle Remus (disambiguation) =

Uncle Remus is the titular fictional narrator of a collection of stories by Joel Chandler Harris.

Uncle Remus may also refer to:

- "Uncle Remus" (song), a song by Frank Zappa and George Duke from Zappa's 1974 album Apostrophe (')
- Uncle Remus (horse), a Thoroughbred racehorse
