= Remus, Georgia =

Unincorporated community in Georgia, U.S.

Coordinates: 33°59′10″N 84°53′35″W

Remus was an unincorporated community in Paulding County, in the U.S. state of Georgia.

== History ==
A post office called Remus was established in 1885, and remained in operation until 1903. The community was named after Uncle Remus, the titular fictional narrator of a collection of stories by Joel Chandler Harris.
