= Thomas Meglioranza =

American operatic baritone (born 1970)

Thomas Meglioranza (born October 7, 1970, New York, New York) is an American operatic baritone.

== Biography ==
Meglioranza was born to an American father of Italian and Polish descent and a Thai mother. Meglioranza grew up in the northern New Jersey towns of Teaneck and Wayne. He began taking voice lessons at Grinnell College, and received a MM from the Eastman School of Music. He is an alum of the training programs at the Aspen, Tanglewood, Bowdoin, Pacific Music Festivals and the Ravinia Festival's Steans Institute, and has been a participant at the Marlboro Music Festival. He has studied with Elizabeth Mannion, Carol Webber, Beverley Peck Johnson, and Fred Carama.

He was a winner of the 2002 Joy in Singing Competition, the 2002 Concert Artists Guild Competition, the 2003 Franz Schubert/Music of Modernity Competition in Graz, placed second in the 2005 Walter Naumburg Competition, and is a frequent song recitalist (most often with pianist Reiko Uchida). He is known for quirky programs (e.g. Schoenberg and His American Pupils, 24 "Italian" Songs and Arias), and for talking to audiences from the stage. His 2009 recital of Songs from the World War I Era was named one of the Philadelphia Inquirer's "Best Classical Performances of the Year".

In 2007, he and Uchida recorded a CD of songs by Franz Schubert that was praised by German baritone Dietrich Fischer-Dieskau. His discography also includes orchestral songs of Virgil Thomson with the Boston Modern Orchestra Project, a period instrument album of French mélodies (including Gabriel Fauré's La bonne chanson), Franz Schubert's Winterreise with Reiko Uchida, and a reconstructed Bach cantata with the Taverner Consort. In 2009, he was appointed Visiting Artist in Voice at the Longy School of Music in Cambridge, Massachusetts.

He sings a great deal of modern music, including the 2008 Tanglewood premiere of John Harbison's Symphony no. 5 with the Boston Symphony, and Peter Maxwell Davies' Eight Songs for a Mad King with the Los Angeles Philharmonic, and is particularly associated with the music of Milton Babbitt, Aaron Jay Kernis, Charles Wuorinen, György Kurtág, Derek Bermel, Jorge Martín, and John Adams.

His operatic repertoire includes Mozart's Count Almaviva, and Don Giovanni, Fritz in Die tote Stadt, as well as many roles in modern works such as Chou En-Lai in John Adams' Nixon in China, Prior Walter in Peter Eötvös' Angels in America, Celestus in Louis Karchin's Romulus, Memphis in Donald Crockett's The Face, and the title role in Gordon Shi-Wen Chin's Mackay─The Black Bearded Bible Man.
