= Remus, West Virginia =

Remus
- Unincorporated community
- Location within the state of West Virginia Remus (the United States)
- Coordinates: 39°9′39″N 81°41′27″W
- Country: United States
- State: West Virginia
- County: Wood
- Elevation: 932 ft (284 m)
- Time zone: UTC-5 (Eastern (EST))
  - Summer (DST): UTC-4 (EDT)
- GNIS ID: 1560489

Remus was an unincorporated community in Wood County, West Virginia, United States.
