= Donatus, Romulus, Secundian, and 86 Companions =

Christian martyrs

Saints Donatus, Romulus, Secundian, and 86 Companions
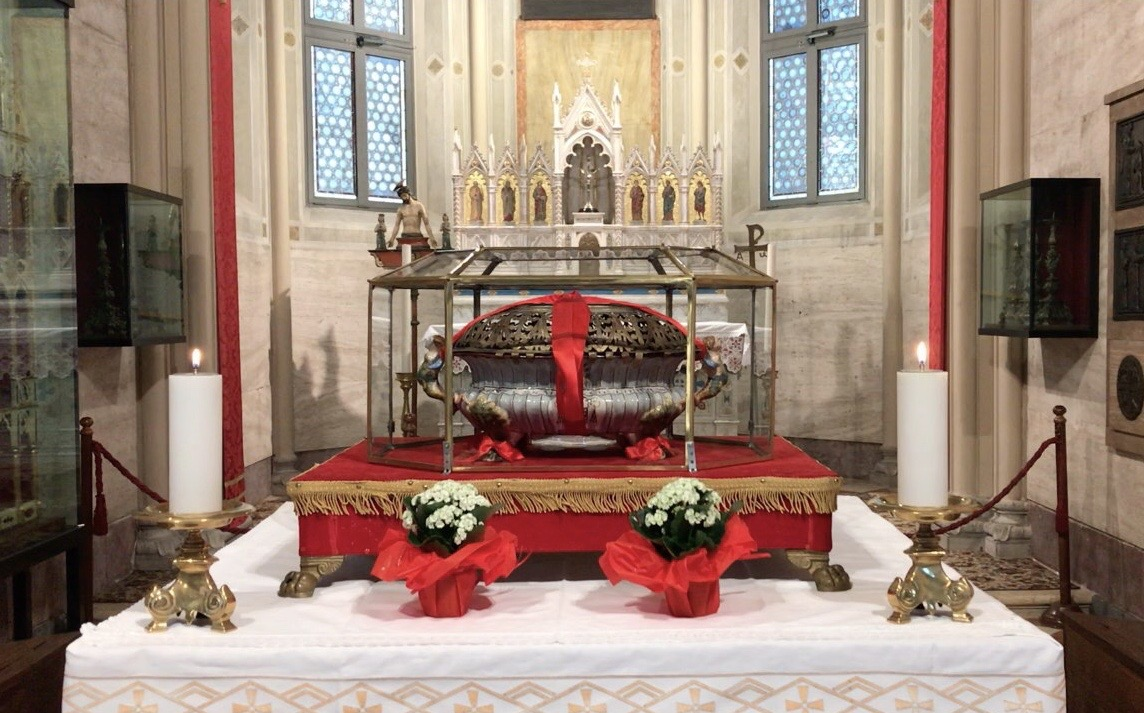
- Urn containing the bones of the Martyrs of Concordia at the Cathedral of St. Stephen in Concordia Sagittaria
- Died: c. 304, Concordia Sagittaria
- Buried: Cathedral of St. Stephen (Concordia Sagittaria)
- Martyred by: Diocletian
- Feast: 17 February

Donatus, Romulus, Secundian, and 86 Companions (died c. 304) were a group of Christians who were martyred at Concordia Sagittaria (at the time called Iulia Concordia), near Venice, during the Diocletianic Persecution. Their feast day is celebrated on February 17.
