= Romulus and Remus (Rubens) =

Painting by Peter Paul Rubens

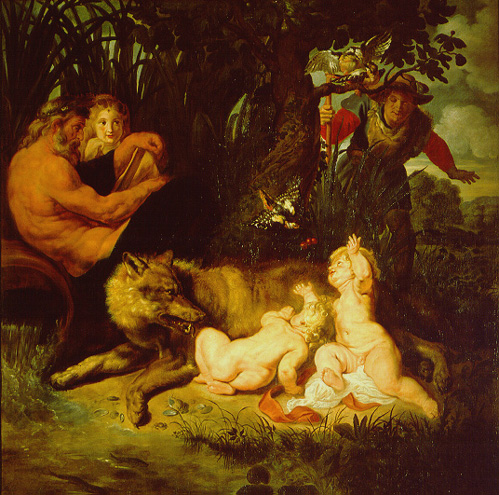
- Artist: Peter Paul Rubens
- Year: 1615–1616
- Medium: Oil on canvas
- Dimensions: 210 cm × 212 cm (83 in × 83 in)
- Location: Pinacoteca Capitolina; Rome

Romulus and Remus is a 1615-1616 painting by the Flemish artist Peter Paul Rubens. It is housed in the Pinacoteca Capitolina in Rome, Italy. It depicts the brothers Romulus and Remus being cared for by a wolf. The painting also shows the god of the Tiber river sitting on his urn, a woodpecker that watched over the twins to bring them food, and a shepherd discovering the infants.
