= Fisher Peak (Alberta) =

Mountain peak in Alberta, Canada

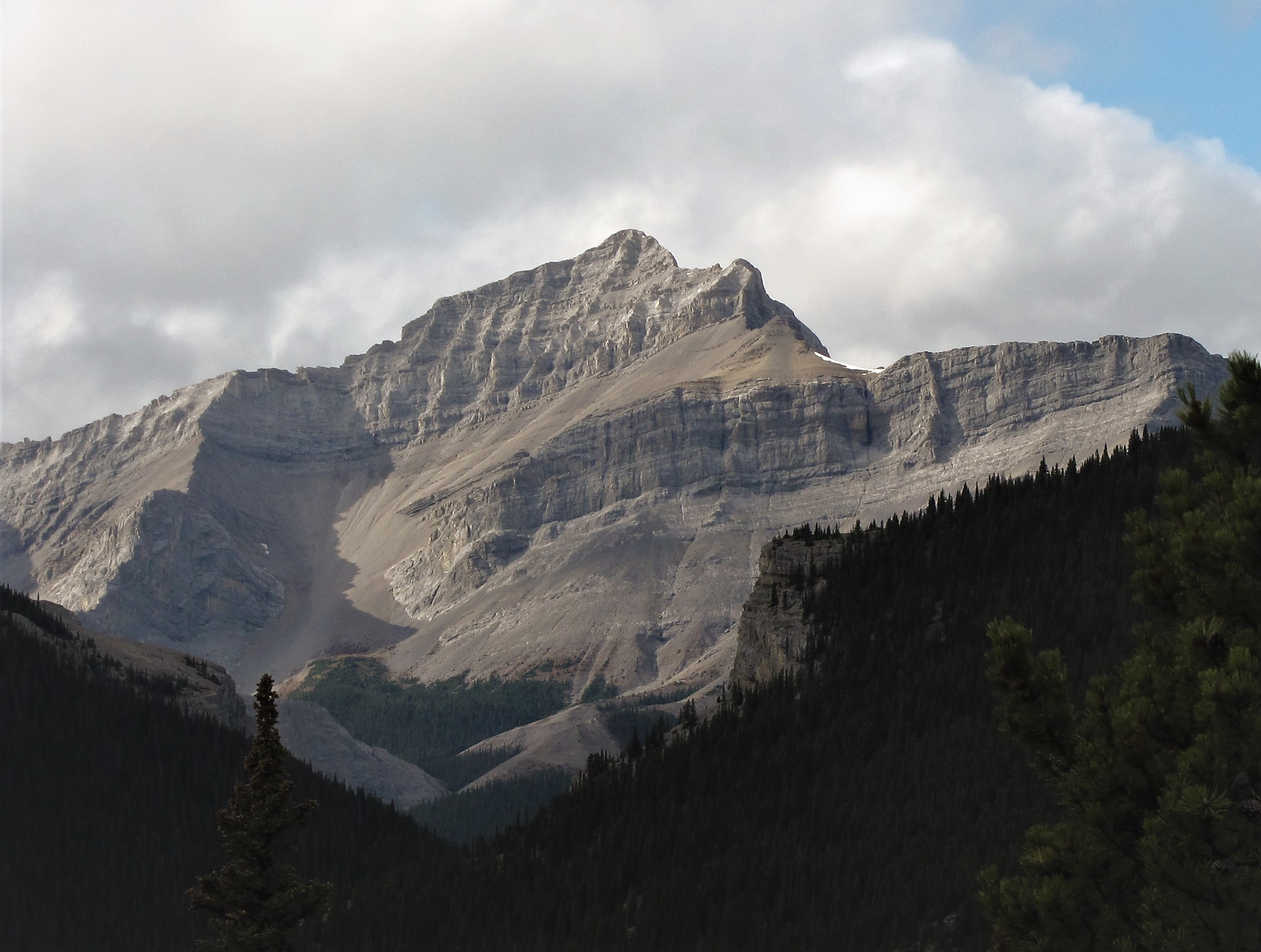
- East aspect, from Nihahi Ridge

Highest point
- Elevation: 3,053 m (10,016 ft)
- Prominence: 904 m (2,966 ft)
- Parent peak: Mount Evan-Thomas (3097 m)
- Listing: Mountains of Alberta
- Coordinates: 50°48′52″N 115°01′48″W

Geography
- Location within Alberta Location within Canada
- Country: Canada
- Province: Alberta
- Parent range: Fisher Range; Canadian Rockies
- Topo map: NTS 82J14 Spray Lakes Reservoir

Geology
- Rock age: Cambrian
- Rock type: sedimentary rock

Climbing
- First ascent: 1950 by J.F. Tarrant
- Easiest route: Difficult, exposed Scramble

Fisher Peak is a 3,053-metre (10,016-foot) mountain summit located in the Fisher Range of Kananaskis Country in the Canadian Rockies of Alberta, Canada. Fisher Peak is the highest point in the Fisher Range, so its nearest higher peak is Mount Evan-Thomas, 7.0 km (4.3 mi) to the southwest in the Opal Range. Precipitation runoff from the mountain drains west into Evan-Thomas Creek, which is a tributary of the Kananaskis River, or east into the Little Elbow River which is a tributary of the Elbow River.

== History ==
The peak was named in 1920 after John Arbuthnot Fisher, 1st Baron Fisher, a British admiral known for reforming and modernizing the Royal Navy prior to World War I. Jackie Fisher, as he was commonly known, has been considered the second most important person in British naval history. The mountain's toponym was officially adopted by the Geographical Names Board of Canada in 1924.

The first ascent of the mountain was made in 1950 by J.F. Tarrant.

== Geology ==
Fisher Peak is composed of sedimentary rock laid down during the Precambrian to Jurassic periods. Formed in shallow seas, this sedimentary rock was pushed east and over the top of younger rock during the Laramide orogeny.

== Climate ==
Based on the Köppen climate classification, Fisher Peak is located in a subarctic climate with cold, snowy winters, and mild summers. Temperatures can drop below −20 °C with wind chill factors below −30 °C. In terms of favorable weather, June through September are the best months to climb.

== See also ==
- List of mountains in the Canadian Rockies
- Geography of Alberta
