= HMS Romulus =

Two ships of the Royal Navy have borne the name HMS Romulus, after Romulus, one of the founders of Rome in Roman mythology:

- HMS Romulus (1777) was a 44-gun fifth rate launched in 1777. In 1781 she was captured by the French off Chesapeake Bay.
- HMS Romulus (1785) was a 36-gun fifth rate launched in 1785. She was used as a troop ship from 1799, was on harbour service from 1813 and was broken up in 1816.
