= Louis Phélypeaux, Seigneur of La Vrillière =

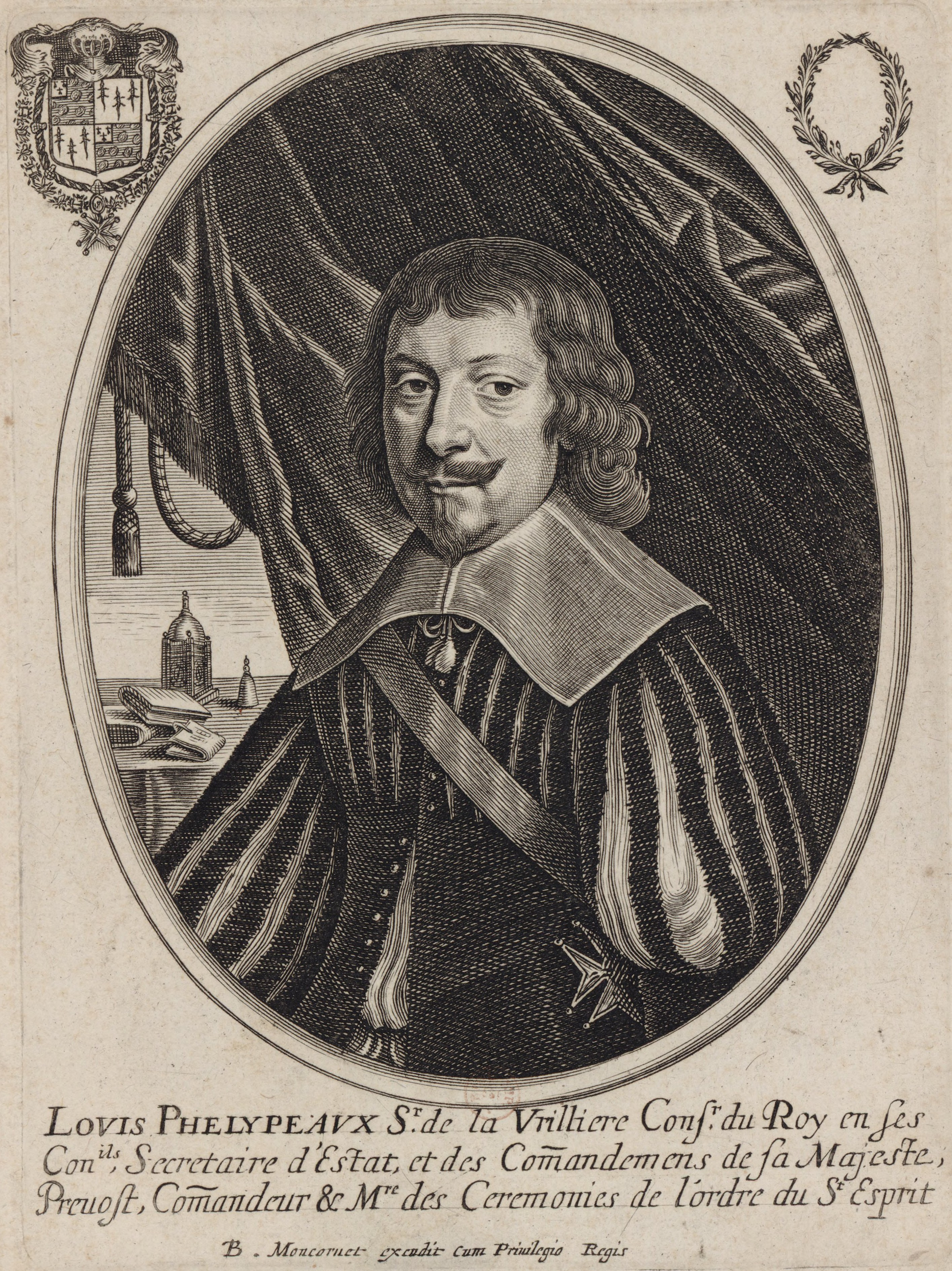
Portrait by Balthasar Moncornet

Louis Phélypeaux, Seigneur of La Vrillière (French: [lwi felipo]; 10 April 1599–1681), seigneur de La Vrillière, marquis de Châteauneuf and Tanlay (1678), comte de Saint-Florentin, was a French politician.

He was the son of Raymond Phélypeaux (†1629), seigneur d'Herbault et de La Vrillière. In 1621, he was made a Minister of State and served as Secretary of State for Protestant Affairs from 1629 to 1681. He was also Provost and Master of Ceremonies of the Ordre du Saint-Esprit from 1643 to 1653.

He was the father of Balthazar Phélypeaux (1638–1700) and grandfather of Louis Phélypeaux (1672–1725).

After he died in 1681, he was buried in a baroque tomb in the church of Saint Martial of Châteauneuf-sur-Loire.

== See also ==
- Louis Phélypeaux (disambiguation)
- Phélypeaux
