= Antoine Philippe, Duke of Montpensier =

French royal; son of Louis Philippe II, Duke of Orléans (1775–1807)

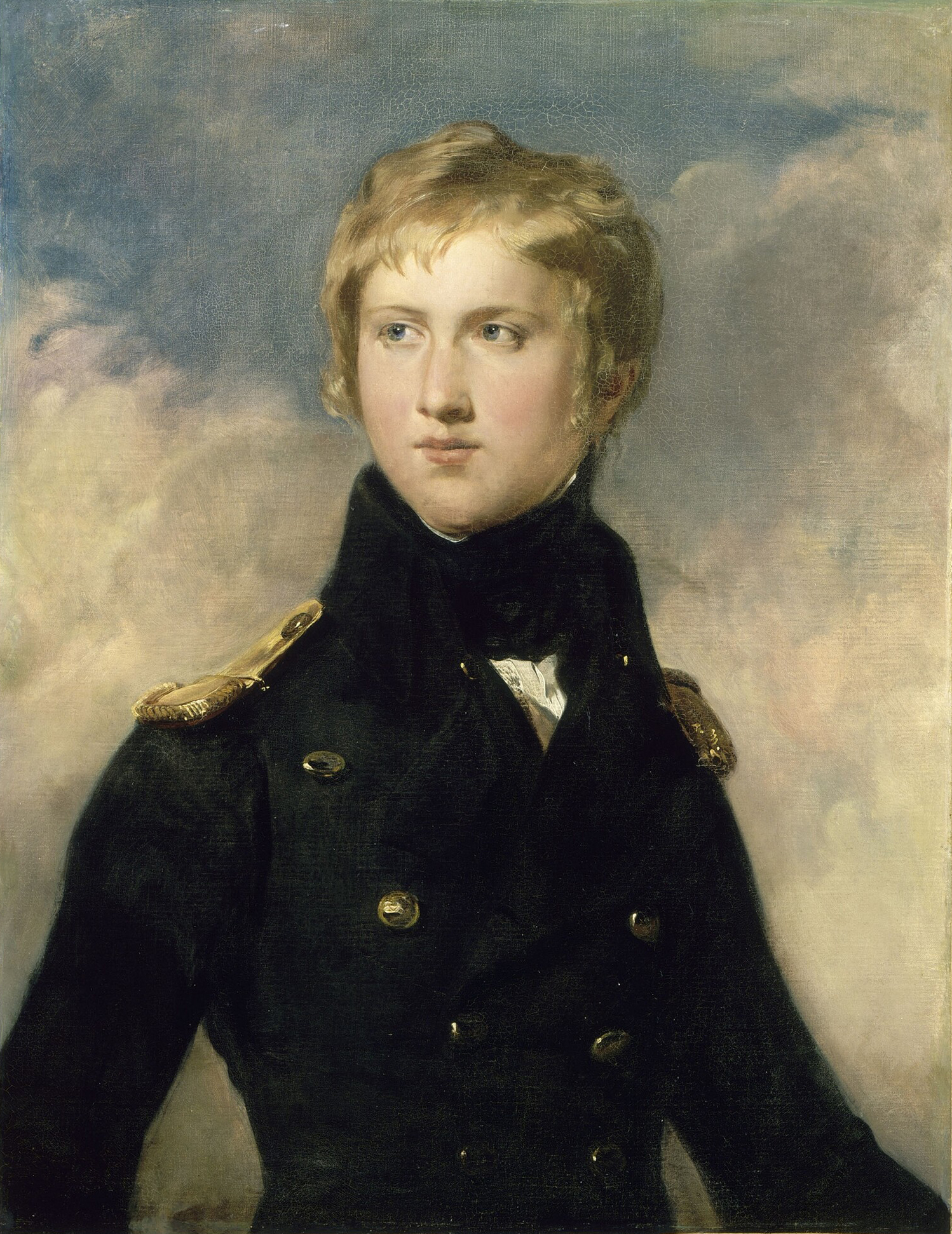
The Duc de Montpensier, in the uniform of a lieutenant-colonel, as adjutant general—portrait by Amédée Faure (Versailles, Musée national des Châteaux et Trianons)

Louis Antoine Philippe d'Orléans, Duke of Montpensier (French pronunciation: [lwi ɑ̃twan filip dɔʁleɑ̃]; 3 July 1775, in Palais-Royal, Paris – 18 May 1807, in Salthill, England) was a son of Louis Philippe, Duke of Orléans (nom de rėvolution: "Philippe-Égalité") (1747–1793), and his duchess Louise Marie Adélaïde de Bourbon, Duchess of Orléans. He was the younger brother of Louis Philippe, later King of the French. Antoine had a deep affection for him, and they were only ever separated during the Reign of Terror and the events that followed between 1793 and 1797.

== Life ==
In 1791, Antoine Philippe was appointed as an aide-de-camp, with the rank of sous-lieutenant in his brother's regiment (his brother, then duc de Chartres, was known as "Général Égalité.") He was made adjutant-general before the battle of Jemmapes, in which both he and his brother fought. In Paris at the time of the trial of Louis XVI, Antoine Philippe attempted unsuccessfully to persuade his father not to vote for the king's death.

In April 1793, whilst adjutant-general in the armée du Var, Antoine Philippe was arrested at the same time as the other Bourbons who had remained in France. He was imprisoned in Fort Saint-Jean at Marseille.

During his imprisonment, Antoine Philippe contracted tuberculosis which eventually killed him. He had an illegitimate son with Françoise Barbaroux – Jean-Antoine-Philippe Dentend (7 July 1797 – 5 March 1858) – who became notary to the House of Orléans. In that role, he oversaw Louis Philippe's donation of his personal property in 1830 before his accession. Antoine never saw his child; on 13 fructidor year IV (30 August 1796), the French Directory decided to exile him to Philadelphia, where the French Republic's chargé-d'affaires in the United States of America granted him an annual pension of 15,000 francs. He set out on 5 November 1796, accompanied by his brother Louis-Charles, comte de Beaujolais, and in February 1797 met Louis-Philippe in Philadelphia. For two years they travelled around New England, the Great Lakes region and the Mississippi valley.

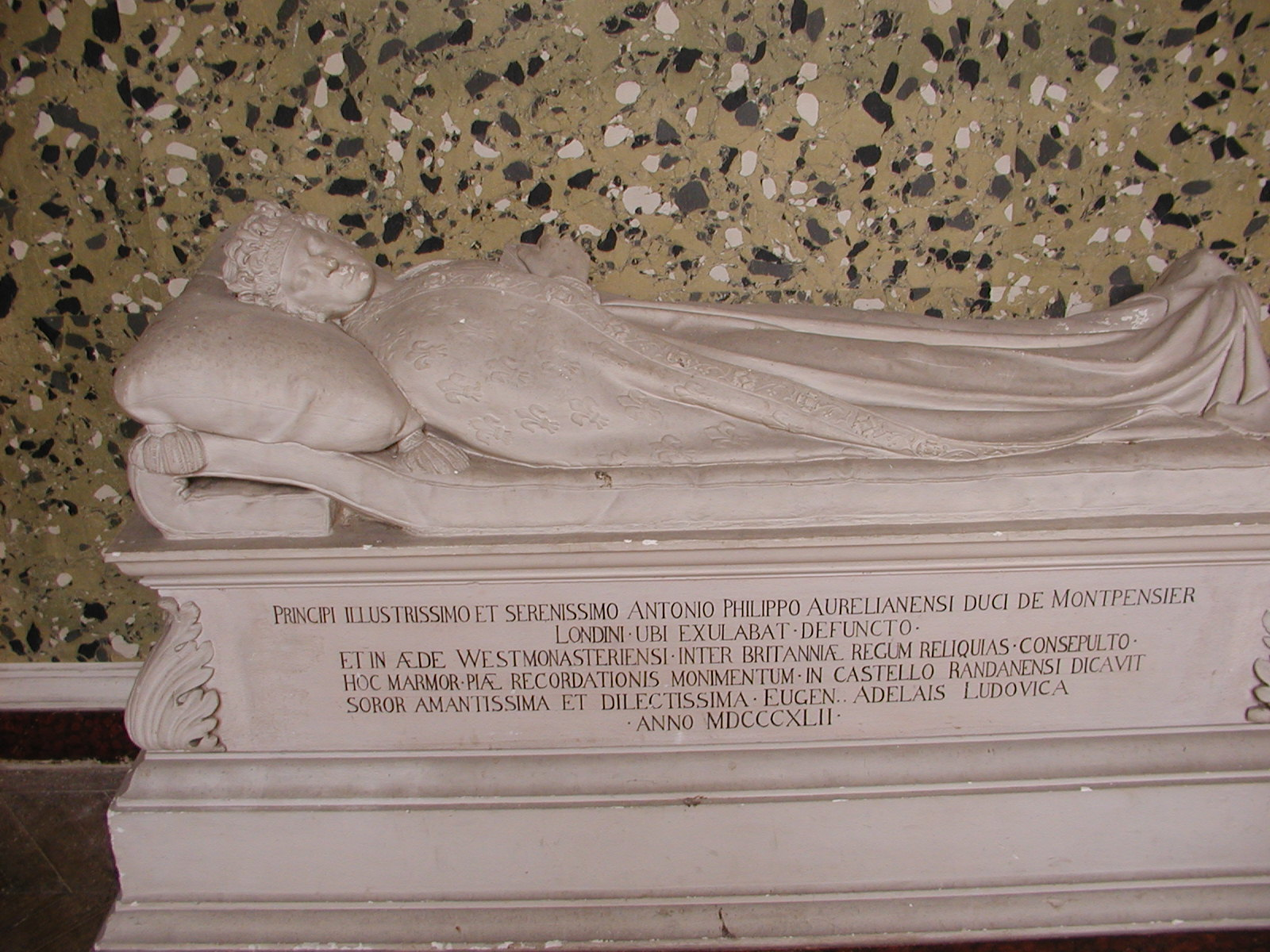
Effigy set up by Adélaïde d'Orléans (1777–1847) on the Domaine royal de Randan

Returning to Europe in 1800, the royal House of Bourbon remained in exile from France, so the brothers set up in England at Twickenham (Highshot House, Crown Road, building demolished in 1927). Later that year Antoine Philippe sought the hand in marriage of Lady Charlotte Adelaide Constantia Rawdon (d. 1834), daughter of the 1st Earl of Moira by his third wife, Elizabeth Hastings, 16th Baroness Botreaux (daughter of the 9th Earl of Huntingdon by his wife, Lady Selena Shirley, founder of the Countess of Huntingdon's Connexion). Despite her noble lineage, consent for the marriage was withheld by Louis, Count of Provence (the future King Louis XVIII), and the couple never wed.

In 1807 Antoine Philippe's tuberculosis worsened, motivating his elder brother to take him to Devon to benefit from the fresh air. Twelve miles out of Twickenham, they were forced to stop at an inn in Salt Hill, near Windsor. During a respiratory crisis, Antoine Philippe refused the ether Louis-Philippe was wanting to administer, and, murmuring to him "Give me your hand, I thought I was dying" ("Donne-moi ta main, j'ai cru que je mourais"), and with that he died.

Antoine Philippe's funeral service was held at the Catholic chapel on King Street in London. Monsieur (the future King Charles X) attended and, thanks to Prince Edward, Duke of Kent, obtained permission to bury his brother in Westminster Abbey.

== Works ==
- Relation de la captivité de S.A.S. Monsignor le duc de Montpensier, pendant les années 1793, 1794, 1795 et 1796, écrite par lui-même, Twickenham, Imprimerie de G. White, 1816
- Mémoires de S.A.S. Louis-Antoine-Philippe d'Orléans, duc de Montpensier, Paris, Baudouin frères, 1824 – text on www.gallica.fr

== Ancestors ==
Ancestors of Antoine Philippe, Duke of Montpensier

16. Philippe II, Duke of Orléans
8. Louis, Duke of Orléans
17. Françoise Marie de Bourbon
4. Louis Philippe I, Duke of Orléans
18. Louis William, Margrave of Baden-Baden
9. Auguste of Baden-Baden
19. Sibylle of Saxe-Lauenburg
2. Louis Philippe II, Duke of Orléans
20. François Louis, Prince of Conti
10. Louis Armand II, Prince of Conti
21. Marie Thérèse de Bourbon
5. Louise Henriette de Bourbon
22. Louis III, Prince of Condé
11. Louise Élisabeth de Bourbon
23. Louise Françoise de Bourbon
1. Antoine Philippe, Duke of Montpensier
24. Louis XIV of France
12. Louis Alexandre, Count of Toulouse
25. Madame de Montespan
6. Louis Jean Marie, Duke of Penthièvre
26. Anne Jules de Noailles, 2nd Duke of Noailles
13. Marie Victoire de Noailles
27. Marie-Françoise de Bournonville
3. Louise Marie Adélaïde de Bourbon
28. Rinaldo d'Este, Duke of Modena
14. Francesco III d'Este, Duke of Modena
29. Charlotte of Brunswick
7. Maria Teresa Felicitas d'Este
30. Philippe II, Duke of Orléans (= 16)
15. Charlotte Aglaé d'Orléans
31. Françoise Marie de Bourbon (= 17)

== References and notes ==
- Hay, Malcolm. Prince in Captivity: based on the Memoirs and unpublished Letters of Antoine Philippe d'Orleans, Duc de Montpensier, 1775-1807 (Eyre & Spottiswoode, 1960)
