= Charlotte of Orléans =

Charlotte of Orléans or Charlotte d'Orléans can refer to:

- Elizabeth Charlotte, Madame Palatine (1652–1722), the second wife of Philippe I, Duke of Orléans
- Charlotte Aglaé d'Orléans (1700–1761), the third daughter of Philippe II, Duke of Orléans
