= Barbaroux (surname) =

Barbaroux is a French surname. Notable people with the surname include:

- Catherine Barbaroux (born 1949), French politician
- Charles Jean Marie Barbaroux (1767–1794), French politician
- Françoise Barbaroux (1761–1822), mistress of Antoine Philippe, Duke of Montpensier

== See also ==
- Barbaroux
