= Princess Matilde d'Este =

Italian nun and princess (1729–1803)

Matilde d'Este
- Born: 7 February 1729; Genoa, Italy
- Died: 14 November 1803 (aged 74); Treviso, Italy
- Burial: Convent of the Visitation, Venice
Names
- Matilde d'Este
- Father: Francesco III d'Este, Duke of Modena
- Mother: Charlotte Aglaé d'Orléans

Matilde d'Este (February 7, 1729 – November 14, 1803) was a Modenese princess by birth. She was the daughter of Francesco III d'Este, Duke of Modena and Charlotte Aglaé d'Orléans.

== Biography ==
Matilde was born in Genoa, the second daughter and fifth child of Francesco III d'Este, Duke of Modena, the sovereign Duke of Modena and his wife, Charlotte Aglaé d'Orléans, Mademoiselle de Valois — a granddaughter of Louis XIV and Madame de Montespan. Her mother separated from her father in the 1740s after an affair with the Duke of Richelieu was discovered at the Modenese court. Exiled to France, Charlotte Aglaé still managed to arrange the marriages of her daughters. Her eldest sister Maria Teresa married her second cousin, the Duke of Penthièvre. Her younger sister, Maria Fortunata also married a cousin of theirs, Louis François Joseph de Bourbon, heir to the Prince of Conti. However, all marriage negotiations for Matilde failed.

After the death of her sister Maria Teresa in 1754, her mother tried to arrange a marriage between Matilde and her sister's widower. However, the grieving Duke declined the offer and never remarried. Matilde would also remain unmarried. She died in 1803 and was interred in the chapel of the Convent of the Visitation in Venice. Two of her siblings, Ercole III of Modena and Maria Fortunata, are also buried there.

== Ancestry ==
Ancestors of Princess Matilde d'Este

16. Alfonso III d'Este, Duke of Modena
8. Francesco I d'Este, Duke of Modena
17. Isabella of Savoy
4. Rinaldo d'Este, Duke of Modena
18. Taddeo Barberini, Prince of Palestrina
9. Lucrezia Barberini
19. Anna Colonna
2. Francesco III d'Este, Duke of Modena
20. George, Duke of Brunswick-Calenberg
10. John Frederick, Duke of Brunswick-Calenberg
21. Anne Eleonore of Hesse-Darmstadt
5. Charlotte of Brunswick
22. Edward, Count Palatine of Simmern
11. Benedicta Henrietta of the Palatinate
23. Anne Gonzaga
1. Matilde d'Este
24. Louis XIII of France
12. Philippe I, Duke of Orléans
25. Anne of Austria
6. Philippe II, Duke of Orléans
26. Charles I Louis, Elector Palatine
13. Elizabeth Charlotte of the Palatinate
27. Charlotte of Hesse-Kassel
3. Charlotte Aglaé of Orléans
28. Louis XIII of France (= 24)
14. Louis XIV of France
29. Anne of Austria (= 25)
7. Françoise Marie de Bourbon
30. Gabriel de Rochechouart, duc de Mortemart
15. Madame de Montespan
31. Diane de Grandseigne
