= Louise Marie Adélaïde de Bourbon, Duchess of Orléans =

Mother of Louis Philippe I, King of the French

Louise Marie Adélaïde de Bourbon
- Duchess of Orléans
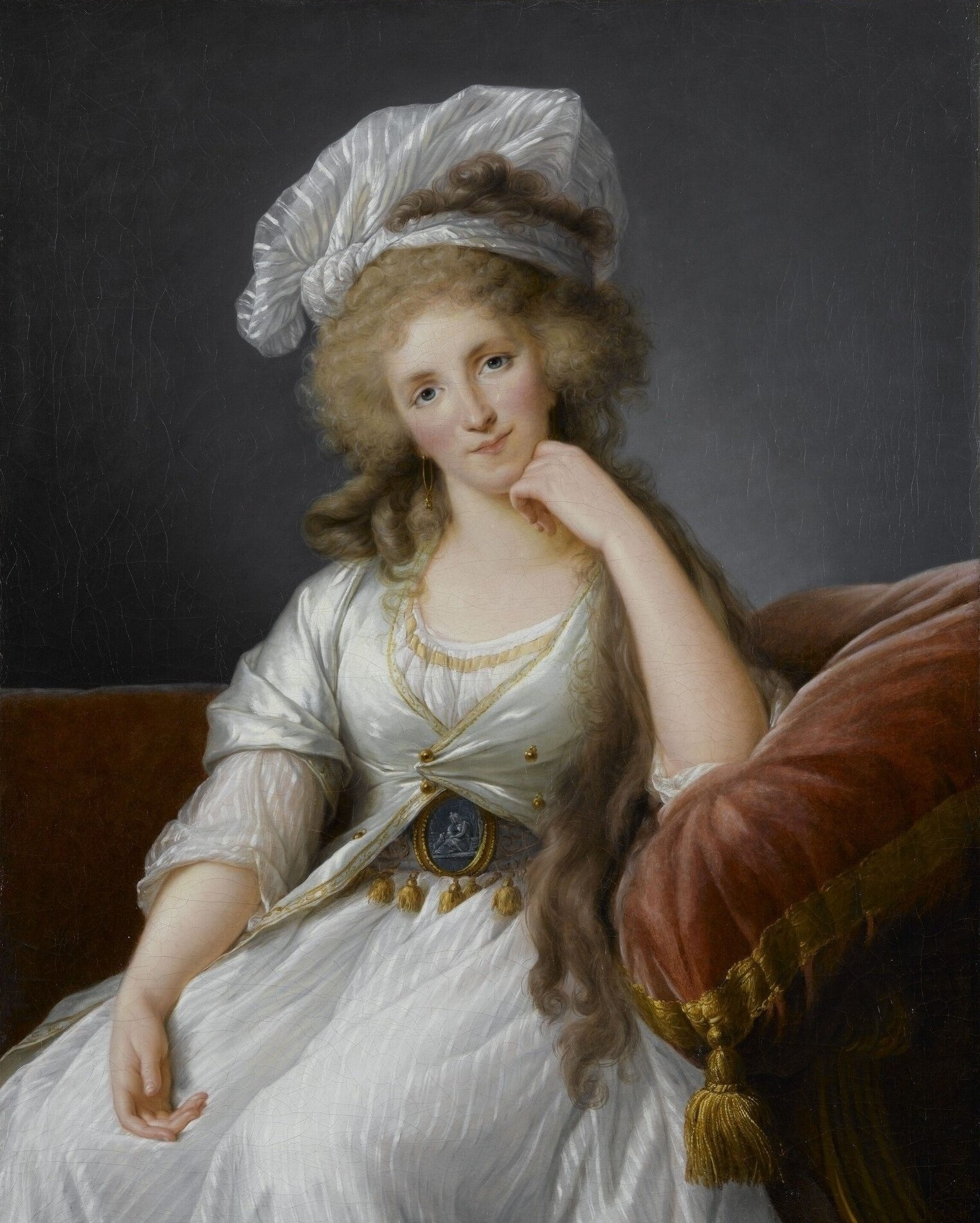
- Portrait by Élisabeth-Louise Vigée-Le Brun
- Born: Louise-Marie-Adelaïde de Bourbon; 13 March 1753; Hôtel de Toulouse, Paris, France
- Died: 23 June 1821 (aged 68); Château d'Ivry-sur-Seine, France
- Burial: Chapelle royale de Dreux
- Spouse: Louis Philippe II, Duke of Orléans (m. 1769; died 1793)
- Issue Detail: Louis Philippe I, King of the French; Antoine Philippe, Duke of Montpensier; Françoise d'Orléans; Adélaïde d'Orléans; Louis Charles, Count of Beaujolais
- House: Bourbon
- Father: Louis Jean Marie de Bourbon, Duke of Penthièvre
- Mother: Princess Maria Teresa d'Este

Louise Marie Adélaïde de Bourbon, Duchess of Orléans (13 March 1753 - 23 June 1821), was the daughter of Louis Jean Marie de Bourbon, Duke of Penthièvre and Princess Maria Teresa d'Este. At the death of her brother, Louis Alexandre, Prince of Lamballe, she became the wealthiest heiress in France prior to the French Revolution. She married Louis Philippe II, Duke of Orléans, the "regicide" Philippe Égalité, and was the mother of France's last king, Louis Philippe I. She was sister-in-law to Marie Thérèse Louise, Princess of Lamballe, and was the last member of the Bourbon-Penthièvre family.

== Early life ==
Marie-Adélaïde was born on 13 March 1753 at the Hôtel de Toulouse, the family residence in Paris since 1712, when her grandfather, Louis-Alexandre de Bourbon, comte de Toulouse, bought it from Louis Phélypeaux de La Vrillière. She was the youngest daughter of Louis Jean Marie de Bourbon, Duke of Penthièvre and his wife, Princess Maria Teresa d'Este. Her mother died in childbirth the following year. Styled Mademoiselle d'Ivoy initially and, as a young girl, until her marriage, Mademoiselle de Penthièvre (derived from the duchy inherited by her father). The style of Mademoiselle de Penthièvre had been previously borne by her sister Marie Louise de Bourbon (1751–1753), who died six months after Marie-Adélaïde's birth.

== Education ==
At birth, she was put in the care of Madame de Sourcy and, as was the custom for many girls of the nobility, she was later raised at the Abbaye de Montmartre convent, overlooking Paris, where she spent twelve years. As a child, she was encouraged to take an active part in the charities for which her father had become known as "Prince of the Poor". His reputation for beneficence made him popular throughout France and, subsequently, saved him during the Revolution.

== Marriage ==
Upon the death of her brother and only sibling, the Prince de Lamballe, on 8 May 1768, Marie-Adélaïde became heiress to what was to become the largest fortune of France.

Her marriage to Louis Philippe Joseph d'Orléans, Duke of Chartres, son of the Duke of Orléans, had been envisaged earlier and, while the Duke of Penthièvre saw in it the opportunity for his daughter to marry the First Prince of the Blood Royal, the Orléanses did not want another union with an illegitimate branch of the royal family. However, when the Prince de Lamballe's death left his sister sole heiress to the family fortune, the bar sinister on her inescutcheon was "overlooked". Although Marie-Adélaîde was much in love with her Orléans cousin, Louis XV warned Penthièvre against such a marriage because of the reputation of the young Duke of Chartres as a libertine. Louis XV was also fearful of the powerful leverage given the Orléans branch should it inherit the Penthièvre fortune.

You are wrong, my cousin, said Louis XV to Penthièvre, the Duke of Chartres has a bad temper, bad habits: he is a libertine, your daughter will not be happy. Do not rush, wait!

Mademoiselle de Penthièvre was presented to the King on 7 December 1768, in a ceremony called de nubilité, by her maternal aunt, Maria Fortunata d'Este, Comtesse de la Marche. She was greeted by Louis XV, the Dauphin and other members of the royal family. On that day, she was baptised by Charles Antoine de La Roche-Aymon, Grand Almoner of France, and given the names Louise Marie Adélaïde.

Her marriage to the Duke of Chartres took place at the Palace of Versailles on 5 April 1769 in a ceremony which all of the princes du sang attended. The marriage contract was signed by all members of the royal family. Afterwards, Louis XV hosted a wedding supper which included the entire royal family. Mlle de Penthièvre brought to the already wealthy House of Orléans a dowry of six million livres, an annual income of 240,000 livres (later increased to 400,000), and the expectation of much more upon her father's death.

=== The Comtesse de Genlis ===
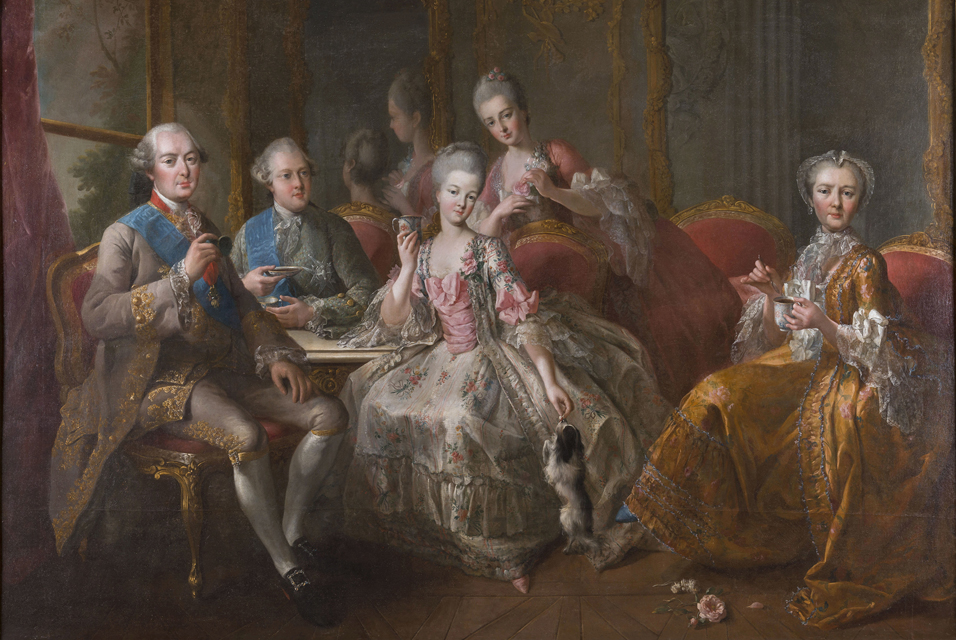
La famille du Duc de Penthièvre, ou La tasse de chocolat, painting by Jean-Baptiste Charpentier le Vieux (1768). From left to right, seated: Duc de Penthièvre; prince de Lamballe; Princesse de Lamballe, Comtesse de Toulouse; standing in background: Mlle de Penthièvre.

During the first few months of their marriage, the couple appeared devoted to each other, but the duke went back to the life of libertinage he had led before his marriage.

In the summer of 1772, a few months after his wife had given birth to a stillborn daughter, Philippe's secret liaison began with one of her ladies-in-waiting, Stéphanie Félicité Ducrest de St-Albin, Comtesse de Genlis, the niece of Madame de Montesson, the morganatic wife of Philippe's father. Passionate at first, the liaison cooled within a few months and, by the spring of 1773, was reported to be "dead". After the romantic affair was over, Félicité remained in the service of Marie-Adélaïde at the Palais-Royal, a trusted friend to both Marie-Adélaïde and Philippe. They both appreciated her intelligence and, in July 1779, she became the governess of the couple's twin daughters born in 1777.

In 1782, the young Louis Philippe was nine and in need of discipline. However, the Duke of Chartres could not think of someone better qualified to "turn his sons over to" than Mme de Genlis. Thus she became the "gouverneur" of the Duc and Duchesse de Chartres' children. Teacher and pupils left the Palais-Royal and went to live in a house built specially for them on the grounds of the Couvent des Dames de Bellechasse in Paris. Mme de Genlis was an excellent teacher, but like those of her former lover, the Duc de Chartres, her liberal political views made her unpopular with Queen Marie Antoinette. In the dissemination of her ideas, de Genlis managed to alienate her charges from their mother.

Marie-Adélaïde began to object to the education given her children by her former lady-in-waiting. The relationship between the two women became unbearable when Louis-Philippe, on 2 November 1790, one month after his seventeenth birthday, joined the revolutionary Jacobin Club. Marie-Adélaïde's relationship with her husband was also at its worst at this point, and the only way the two would communicate was through letters. In the memoirs of the Baronne d'Oberkirch, Marie-Adélaïde is described as:

always wearing a melancholic expression which nothing could cure. She sometimes smiled, she never laughed

Upon the death of her father-in-law Louis Philippe d'Orléans in November 1785, her husband became the new Duke of Orléans, and First Prince of the Blood, taking rank only after the immediate family of the king. As the wife of a prince du sang she was entitled to be addressed as "Your Serene Highness", though she already had such privilege by birth.

== Revolution ==
On 5 April 1791, Marie-Adélaïde left her husband, and went to live with her father at the château de Bizy overlooking Vernon, Eure in Normandy In September 1792, having sided with the Revolution, the Duke of Orléans was elected to the National Convention under the name of Philippe Égalité. Siding with the radical group called La Montagne, he was from the very beginning suspect in the eyes of the Girondists, who wanted all the Bourbons to be banished from France. The fate of the Orléans family was sealed when Marie-Adélaïde's eldest son, the duc de Chartres, "Général Égalité" in the Army of the North commanded by Charles François Dumouriez, sought political asylum from the Austrians in March 1793. On 6 April, all the members of the Orléans family still remaining in France were arrested. After their arrest in Paris, Philippe Égalité and his son, the comte de Beaujolais, were imprisoned in the prison de l'Abbaye in Paris.

Later, the two were transferred to the prison of Fort Saint-Jean in Marseille, where they were soon joined by the duc de Montpensier who had been arrested while serving as an officer in the Army of the Alps. The day before his father and brothers were arrested in France, the duc de Chartres rushed to Tournai, near the French border, where his sister Adélaïde and Mme de Genlis had been living since Philippe Égalité had made them emigrate in November 1792. The duc de Chartres accompanied them to safety in Switzerland. In the meantime, due to her poor health, Marie-Adélaïde was allowed to stay in France, under guard, at the château de Bizy, where her father had died a month earlier. Her inheritance, however, was confiscated by the revolutionary government. Despite having voted for the death of his cousin Louis XVI, and having denounced his son's defection, Philippe-Égalité was guillotined on 6 November 1793.

== Widow Égalité ==
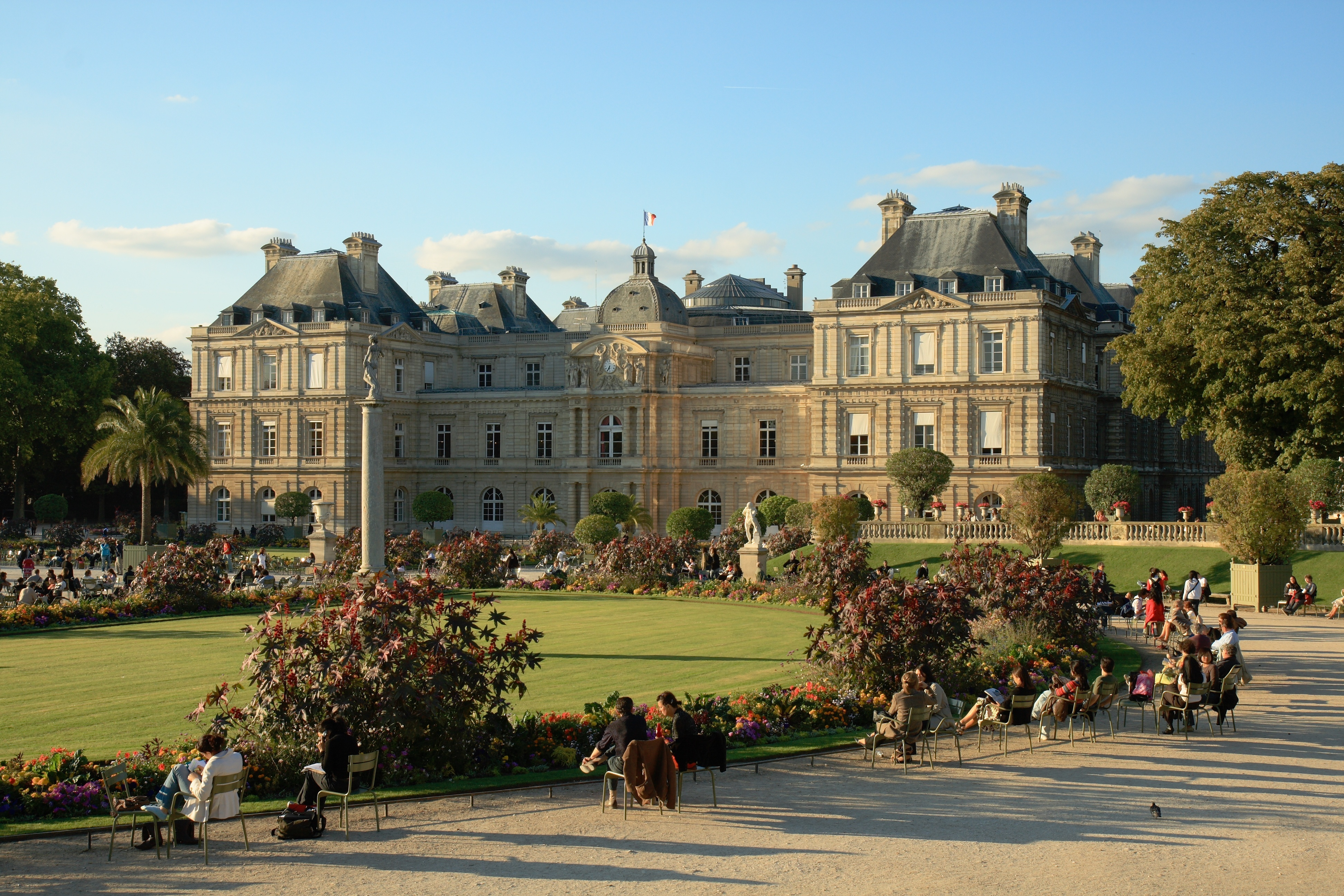
The Palais du Luxembourg where Marie-Adélaïde was imprisoned from November 1793 to July 1794.

Upon the execution of her husband, Marie-Adélaïde, now known as the "Veuve Égalité" ("Widow Égalité"), was incarcerated at the Luxembourg Palace, which had been transformed into a prison during the Revolution. There she met the man who was to become the "love of her life", a former member of the National Convention named Jacques-Marie Rouzet, who had been imprisoned at the fall of the Girondins. Nearly executed before the fall of Robespierre, in July 1794 at the end of the Reign of Terror, she was transferred to the "Pension Belhomme", a former mental institution turned into a "prison for the rich" during the Revolution.

After Rouzet, who after his liberation had become a member of the Council of Five Hundred, succeeded, in 1796, to secure her liberation and that of her two sons still imprisoned in Marseille, the two always remained together and lived in Paris until 1797, when a decree banished the remaining members of the House of Bourbon from France. Marie-Adélaïde was exiled to Spain, as was her sister-in-law Bathilde d'Orléans, the last princesse de Condé. Rouzet accompanied them to the Spanish border and managed to secretly join them in Barcelona where he became her chancellor, and she obtained for him the title of comte de Folmont.

Marie-Adélaïde was never to see her two younger sons again, Montpensier and Beaujolais, who died in exile before the 1814 Bourbon Restoration. She, Rouzet and the Orléans exiled in Spain returned to France in 1814 at the time of the first Bourbon Restoration. After legal battles which lasted until her death, the bulk of her inheritance was eventually recovered. She died in her castle at Ivry-sur-Seine on 23 June 1821, after battling breast cancer. Rouzet had died nine months before, on 25 October 1820, and she had him inhumed in the new family chapel she had built in Dreux in 1816, as the final resting place for the two families, Bourbon-Penthièvre and Orléans.

The original Bourbon-Penthièvre family crypt in the Collégiale de Saint-Étienne de Dreux had been violated during the Revolution and the bodies thrown together into a grave in the Chanoines Cemetery of the Collégiale. She was buried in the new chapel which, after the accession to the throne of her son Louis Philippe, was enlarged, embellished and renamed Chapelle royale de Dreux, becoming the necropolis for the now royal Orléans family. Marie Adélaïde did not live to see her son Louis Philippe become King of the French in 1830.

== Cultural references ==
In the 2006 film, Marie Antoinette, Marie-Adélaïde appears as a minor character played by actress Aurore Clément.

== Issue ==
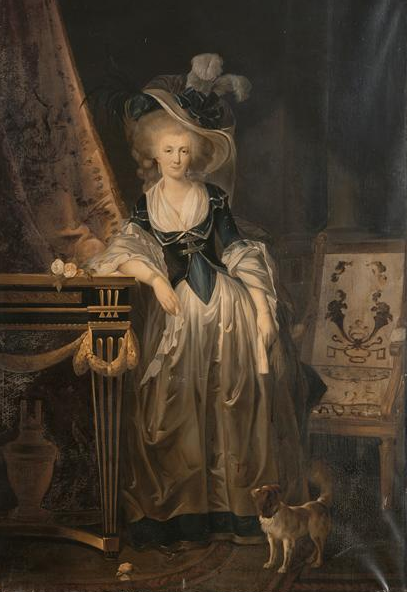
The Duchess of Chartres by Charles Lepeintre, 1786.

The couple had six children:

1. A daughter (died at birth, 10 October 1771)
2. Louis Philippe d'Orléans (future King Louis Philippe I of the French), (Palais Royal, 1773–1850, Claremont) Duke of Valois (1773–1785) **Duke of Chartres (1785–1793) Duke of Orléans (1793–1830) married Maria Amalia of Naples and had issue.
3. Louis Antoine Philippe d'Orléans, Duke of Montpensier, (Palais Royal, 1775–1807, Salthill),
4. Françoise Caroline Auguste d'Orléans, Mademoiselle d'Orléans (Palais Royal, 1777–1782, Palais Royal), twin sister of (below),
5. Louise Marie Adélaïde Eugénie d'Orléans, Mademoiselle de Chartres (Palais Royal, 1777–1847, Palais de Tuileries) never married.
6. Louis Charles Alphonse Léodgard d'Orléans, Count of Beaujolais (Palais Royal, 1779–1808, Malta) never married

== The painting ==
On the eve of the French Revolution, in 1789, she was painted by Élisabeth-Louise Vigée-Le Brun, the favourite portrait painter of Queen Marie Antoinette. The painting was titled Madame la Duchesse d'Orléans. Vigée-Le Brun made use of the lonely duchess' melancholia in the pose. Dressed in white, a reminder of her candor, the head of the duchess is supported on her upraised arm. She is shown with a languid, sad expression. Below the breast is a Wedgwood medallion which Colin Eisler has identified as Poor Maria, possibly a reference to the life of the duchess, which was later destroyed because of the Revolution. The painting is now at the Palace of Versailles. There is another copy in the musée de Longchamp, Marseille. Versailles has a third copy which has been incorrectly described as a replica.

== Ancestry ==
Ancestors of Louise Marie Adélaïde de Bourbon, Duchess of Orléans

8. Louis XIV of France
4. Louis Alexandre, Count of Toulouse
9. Madame de Montespan
2. Louis Jean Marie, Duke of Penthièvre
10. Anne Jules, duc de Noailles
5. Marie Victoire de Noailles
11. Marie-Françoise de Bournonville
1.Louise Marie Adélaïde de Bourbon
12. Rinaldo d'Este, Duke of Modena
6. Francesco III d'Este, Duke of Modena
13. Charlotte Felicitas of Brunswick
3. Maria Teresa Felicitas d'Este
14. Philippe II, Duke of Orléans
7. Charlotte Aglaé d'Orléans
15. Françoise Marie de Bourbon

Louise Marie Adélaïde de Bourbon, Duchess of Orléans House of Bourbon-Penthièvre Cadet branch of the House of Bourbon Born: 13 March 1753 Died: 27 June 1821
French nobility
| Preceded by N/A | Mademoiselle d'Ivoy; 1753–1769 | Succeeded by N/A |
| Preceded by Marie Louise de Bourbon | Mademoiselle de Penthièvre; 1753–1769 | Succeeded by N/A |
| Preceded by Louis Jean Marie de Bourbon, Duke of Penthièvre | Countess of Eu with Louis Philippe Joseph d'Orléans; 1769–1821 | Succeeded by House of Orléans |
| Preceded by Louis Jean Marie de Bourbon, Duke of Penthièvre | Duchess of Aumale; 1793–1821 | Succeeded by Louis-Phillipe d'Orléans |
| Preceded by Louise Henriette de Bourbon | Duchess of Chartres as spouse of Duke of Chartres; 1769–1785 | Succeeded by Princess Françoise Marie d'Orléans |
| Preceded by Louise Henriette de Bourbon | Duchess of Orléans as spouse of Duke of Orléans; 1785–1793 | Succeeded by Princess Maria Amalia of the Two Sicilies after the Revolution |
| Preceded by Louise Henriette de Bourbon | Madame la Princesse; 1785–1793 | Succeeded by Revolution |
Italian royalty
| Preceded by Louis Jean Marie de Bourbon, Duke of Penthièvre | Princess of Carignan; 1793–1821 | Succeeded by House of Orléans |
