= Princess Maria Fortunata d'Este =

Princess of Conti (1731–1803)

Maria Fortunata d'Este
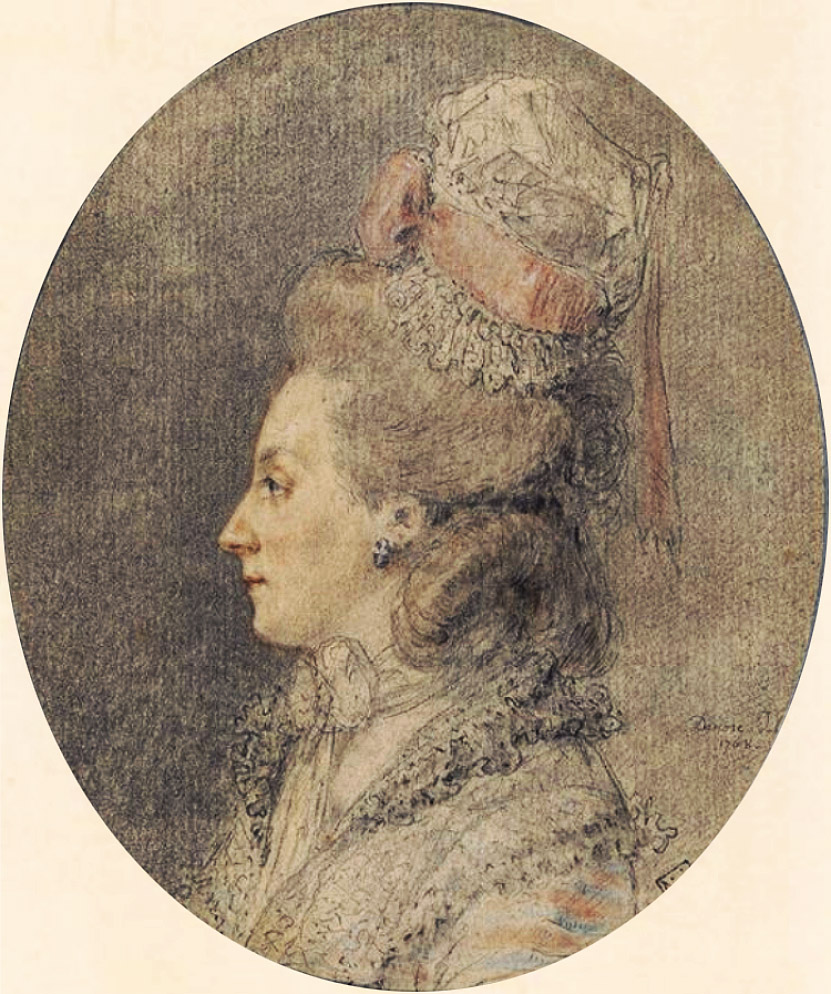
- Portrait c. 1780

Princess of Conti
- Tenure: 2 August 1776 – 21 September 1803
- Born: 24 November 1731; Ducal Palace, Modena
- Died: 21 September 1803 (aged 71); Venice, Italy
- Burial: Convent of the Visitation, Venice
- Spouse: Louis François Joseph de Bourbon (m. 1759)
Names
- Maria Fortunata d'Este
- Father: Francesco III d'Este, Duke of Modena
- Mother: Charlotte Aglaé d'Orléans

Maria Fortunata d'Este (24 November 1731 – 21 September 1803) was a Modenese princess by birth and a princess du sang by marriage. By her marriage to Louis François Joseph de Bourbon, Prince of Conti, her first cousin, she became the Countess of La Marche and later the Princess of Conti; and was a member of the French court of Kings Louis XV and Louis XVI. She was the last Princess of Conti, and died without issue.

== Biography ==
She was born at the Ducal Palace of Modena, the fourth daughter and eighth child of Francesco III d'Este, Duke of Modena, the Sovereign Duke of Modena and his young wife Charlotte Aglaé d'Orléans, Mademoiselle de Valois — granddaughter of Louis XIV and Madame de Montespan. She had a twin sister Beatrice who died in infancy. Her older sister Maria Teresa was her eldest surviving sibling followed by her brother the future Ercole III d'Este, Duke of Modena. The rest of her siblings would die unmarried.

Maria Fortunata was known to have been very pious and at the same time rather timid but charming. Her mother separated from her father in the 1740s after an affair with the Duke of Richelieu was discovered at the Modenese court. Exiled to France, Charlotte Aglaé still managed to help arrange the marriages of two of her daughters. The eldest Maria Teresa Felicitas married her second cousin, the Duke of Penthièvre, the wealthiest man in France and the future in laws of Philippe Égalité. Maria Fortunata also married a cousin, Louis François Joseph de Bourbon, the heir to the Prince of Conti.

== Marriage ==
As the heir of his father, her husband was known by the courtesy title of comte de La Marche at court. The marriage contract was signed in Milan on 3 January 1759 by the French ambassador to the court of Turin. A wedding by proxy took place in Milan on 7 February of the same year. It was celebrated in person on 27 February at Nangis-en-Brie in France. Maria Fortunata's father settled upon her a dowry of one million livres. In addition, upon her arrival in France, her husband was given a gift of 150,000 livres from King Louis XV. The young comtesse de La Marche was presented to the King, the Queen and the rest of the royal family on 5 March 1759 by the Dowager Princess of Conti, her husbands widowed grandmother as well as her mothers own first cousin. The couple did not get along and never had any children. Many at court said this state of affairs was due to the influence of her husband's mistress, Marie Anne Véronèse, known as Mademoiselle Coraline. Véronèse had been a dancer at an Italian theatre. Louis François and his mistress had two illegitimate children together, born in 1761 and 1767. In 1768, Maria Fortunata was asked to present her niece Louise Marie Adélaïde de Bourbon, Mademoiselle de Penthièvre, to the King and the court. Her niece would eventually marry Louis Philippe Joseph d'Orléans, Duke of Chartres, the future Philipe-Égalité, in April 1769.

In 1770, the marriage of the Dauphin of France (future Louis XVI) and the Archduchess Maria Antonia of Austria took place. Marie Fortunée, as she was known in France, and her husband were one of twelve couples invited to dine with the newlyweds in the Opéra of the Palace of Versailles, which had been constructed for the royal wedding.

== Princess of Conti ==
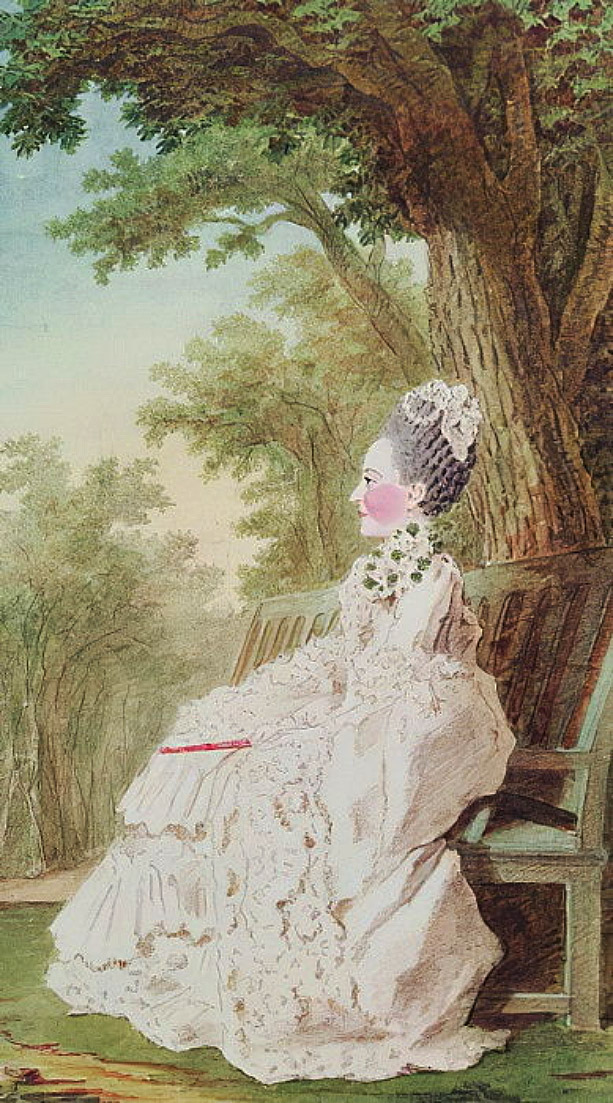
Este in 1768 by Carmontelle

In 1776, Marie Fortunée's father-in-law died making her husband the head of the House of Conti. Pious, discreet and very cultured, Marie Fortunée was not destined to be part of the new Queen's inner circle at Versailles. She maintained very good relations with her brother-in-law, the Duke of Penthièvre, who had lost his wife in 1754. She also got on well with her two nieces, the Princess of Lamballe and the future Duchess of Orléans.

While at the French court, in 1784 she met Gustav III of Sweden, styled incognito as the Count of Haga who was a guest at the Hôtel de Toulouse and later on she met Prince Henry of Prussia, brother of Frederick the Great. She also met her niece Maria Beatrice d'Este and her husband Archduke Ferdinand of Austria in 1786. The latter pair were styled as the Count and Countess of Nettembourg. Ferdinand was a son of Empress Maria Theresa.

=== Exile ===
The Conti couple officially separated in 1777 even though they had lived apart since 1775. In 1780, Marie Fortunée acquired the Château de Triel, a place which would become her favourite haunt. During the crisis of 1789, when the Estates General was called at Versailles, Marie Fortunée supported the royal family and even took part in a march to the Church of Saint Louis. She later escaped revolutionary France under the name of the comtesse de Triel. After first taking refuge in Brussels, Marie Fortunée eventually settled in Chambéry, then a part of the Kingdom of Sardinia. In 1791, she moved, this time to Fribourg which was a small village in Switzerland known for its large settlement of émigrés. The town also had strong religious ties, another attraction for the pious princess.

In 1794, she let her great-niece Adélaïde d'Orléans stay with her after her escape from France. Adélaïde's mother, the duchesse d'Orléans, had been imprisoned in the Luxembourg Palace in Paris. The elderly Marie Fortunée and Adélaïde d'Orléans set up a new home in Bavaria. During the spring of 1800, the pair and their household were forced to flee again to Hungary in order to avoid the hostilities of Consul Napoleon Bonaparte. It was while in Hungary that she received another visit from her niece, Maria Beatrice. The princess was the heiress of Marie Fortunée's elder brother, who had lost the duchies of Modena and Reggio in 1796 as a result of the Napoleonic creation of the Cispadane Republic.

=== Death ===
1801 saw the reunion of Adélaïde d'Orléans and her mother, the now dowager Duchess of Orléans, in Barcelona after her release from prison and exile from France. Later, Marie Fortunée decided to retire to the Convent of the Visitation in Venice. She moved to the convent on 19 October with three of her maids and her faithful friend, the comtesse des Roches, who had accompanied the princess all throughout her exile in Europe. A victim of pleurisy, the princess died on 21 September 1803 at the age of seventy-one. She was buried in the chapel of the convent. Her brother, Ercole III d'Este of Modena, and her sister, Princess Matilde d'Este, are also buried there.

The comtesse des Roches died some time after Marie Fortunée and was also buried there. Marie Fortunée's husband died in 1814.

== Arms ==
Coat of arms of Maria Fortunata d'Este as Princess of Conti
Escutcheon Per pale: I, azure, three fleurs-de-lis or, a baton gules debruising the field bendwise, and a bordure gules (Bourbon-Conti); II, quarterly: 1 and 4, or, a double-headed eagle sable, beaked, membered, and bound gules; 2 and 3, aure, three fleurs-de-lis or, a bordure indented gules and or; overall on the second half, a pale gules charged with two keys in saltire—one argent, the other or—bound azure, and in chief a tiara banded and surmounted by a cross or; overall on the whole, azure, an eagle argent, beaked, langued, and crowned or (Este).

== Ancestry ==
Ancestors of Princess Maria Fortunata d'Este

16. Alfonso III d'Este, Duke of Modena
8. Francesco I d'Este, Duke of Modena
17. Isabella of Savoy
4. Rinaldo d'Este, Duke of Modena
18. Taddeo Barberini, Prince of Palestrina
9. Lucrezia Barberini
19. Anna Colonna
2. Francesco III d'Este, Duke of Modena
20. George, Duke of Brunswick-Calenberg
10. John Frederick, Duke of Brunswick-Lüneburg-Calenberg
21. Anne Eleonore of Hesse-Darmstadt
5. Charlotte of Brunswick
22. Edward, Count Palatine of Simmern
11. Benedicta Henrietta of the Palatinate
23. Anne Gonzaga
1. Maria Fortunata d'Este
24. Louis XIII of France
12. Philippe I, Duke of Orléans
25. Anne of Austria
6. Philippe II, Duke of Orléans
26. Charles I Louis, Elector Palatine
13. Elizabeth Charlotte of the Palatinate
27. Charlotte of Hesse-Kassel
3. Charlotte Aglaé of Orléans
28. Louis XIII of France (= 24)
14. Louis XIV of France
29. Anne of Austria (= 25)
7. Françoise Marie de Bourbon
30. Gabriel de Rochechouart, duc de Mortemart
15. Madame de Montespan
31. Diane de Grandseigne
