= Adélaïde d'Orléans =

French royal (1777–1847)

Princess Adélaïde
- Madame Adélaïde
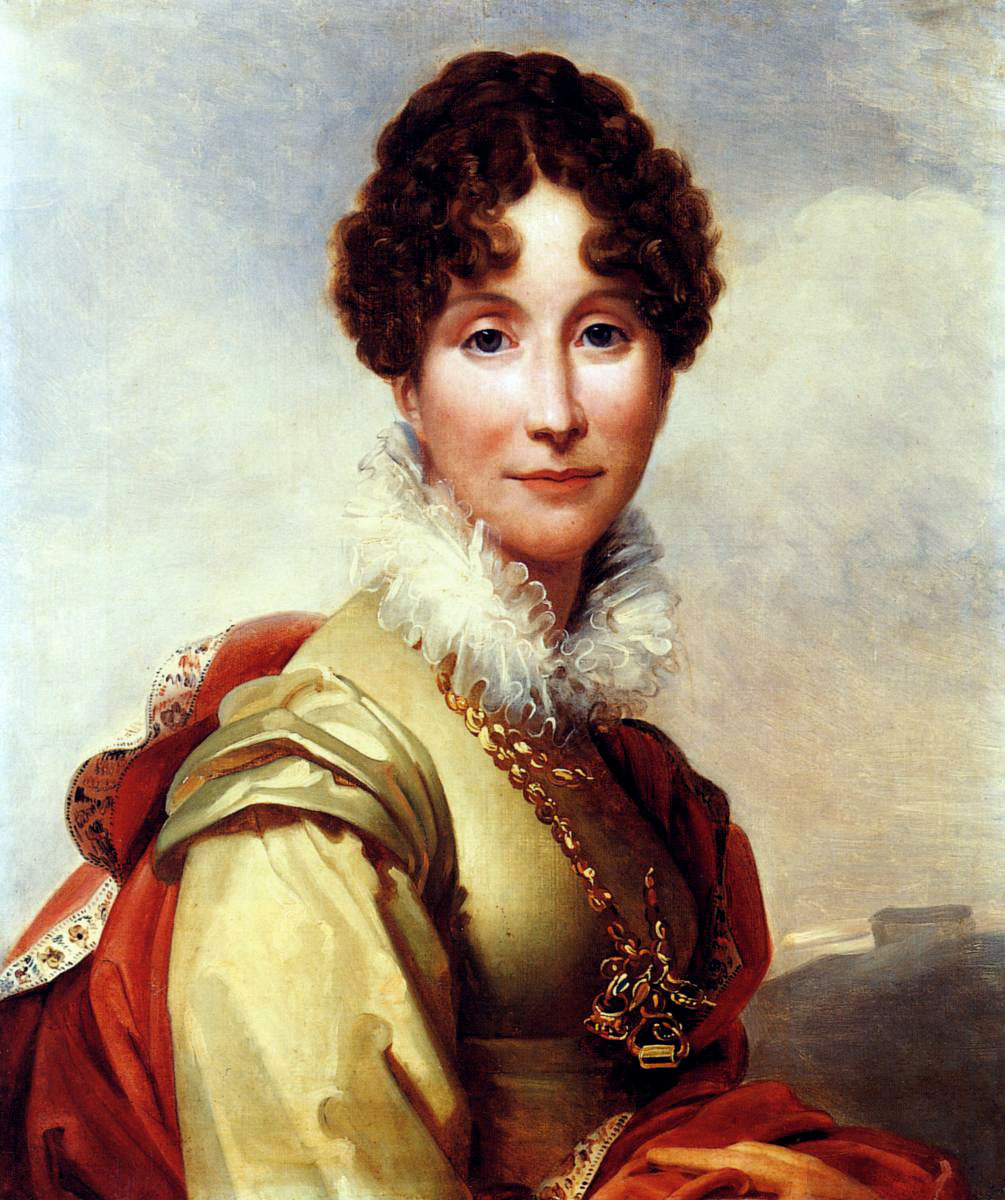
- Born: 23 August 1777; Palais Royal, Paris, France
- Died: 31 December 1847 (aged 70); Palais des Tuileries, Paris, France
- Burial: Chapelle royale de Dreux
Names
- Louise Marie Adelaïde Eugénie d'Orléans
- House: Orléans
- Father: Louis Philippe II, Duke of Orléans
- Mother: Louise Marie Adélaïde de Bourbon

Louise Marie Adélaïde Eugénie d'Orléans (23 August 1777 – 31 December 1847) was a French princess, one of the daughters of Philippe d'Orléans, known as Philippe Égalité during the French Revolution, and Louise Marie Adélaïde de Bourbon. She was titled Mademoiselle de Chartres at birth, Mademoiselle d'Orléans at the death of her older twin sister in 1782, Mademoiselle (1783–1812), Madame Adélaïde (1830). As a member of the reigning House of Bourbon, she was a princesse du sang.

== Biography ==
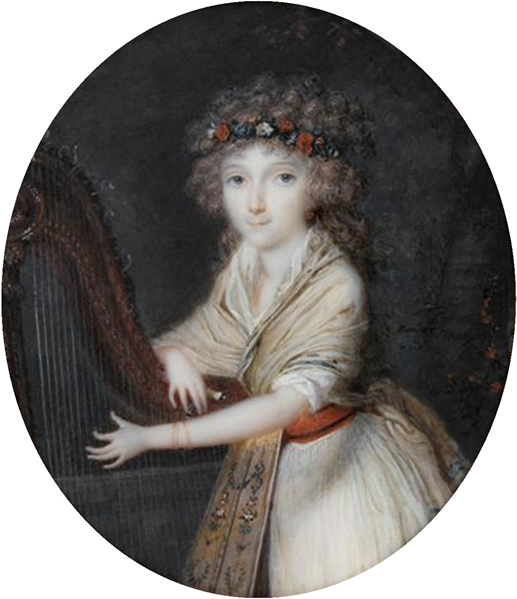
Princess Adélaïde as a young girl in 1782, by Joseph Tassy.

Adélaïde and her older twin sister Françoise were born at the Palais Royal on 23 August 1777 to Louis Philippe II, Duke of Orléans and Louise Marie Adélaïde de Bourbon. Françoise died in 1782, aged four. She was raised according to the liberal principles of her governess, Madame de Genlis, principles which also became her own political conviction. She received an excellent but also very hard and strenuous education; to harden herself, she learned to sleep on a hard bed and arise at six every day. She was deeply attached to her governess, and her mother's demand that de Genlis be replaced, though without success, was reportedly a cause of great worry for her. She was considered for marriage to the Duke of Angoulême, but the plans were prevented by queen Marie Antoinette. Later on, she was also considered for marriage to the Duke of Berry, which did not materialise either.

During the French Revolution, de Genlis on at least one occasion took her to the radical Cordelieres Club. In 1791, her father asked de Genlis to take her to England for her safety. The year after, he summoned them back to prevent Adelaide's name from being placed on the list of émigrés. When they arrived, however, de Genlis discovered that Adélaïde was already on the list and that her father, whose political situation had deteriorated, asked her to take Adélaïde out of the country again.

Adelaide received painting lessons from Pierre-Joseph Redouté and produced some highly regarded botanical studies as a result.

=== Life in exile ===
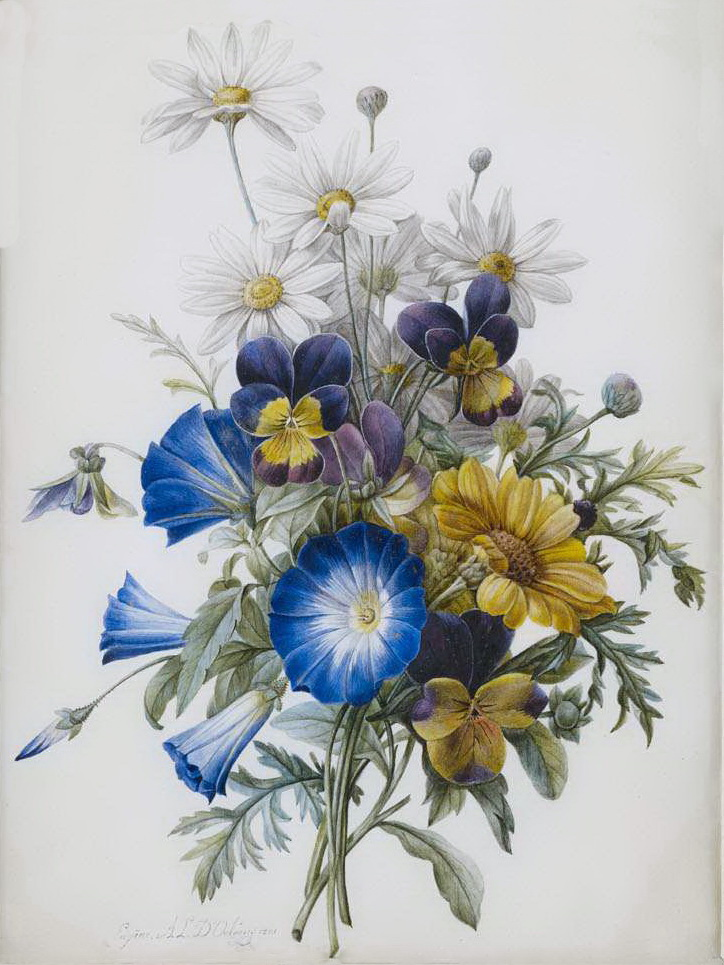
1812 painting by Adélaïde

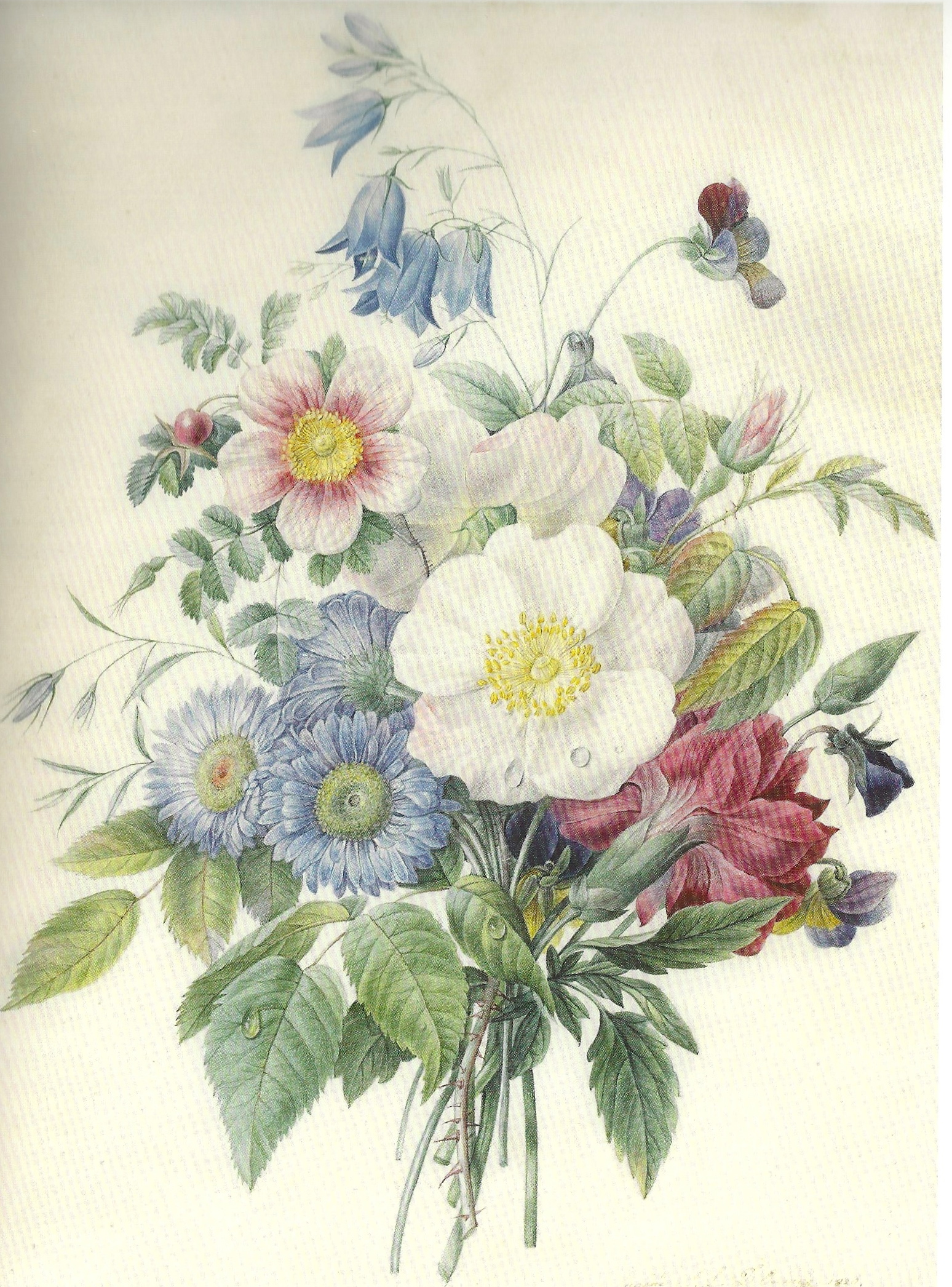
Summer posy by Adélaïde

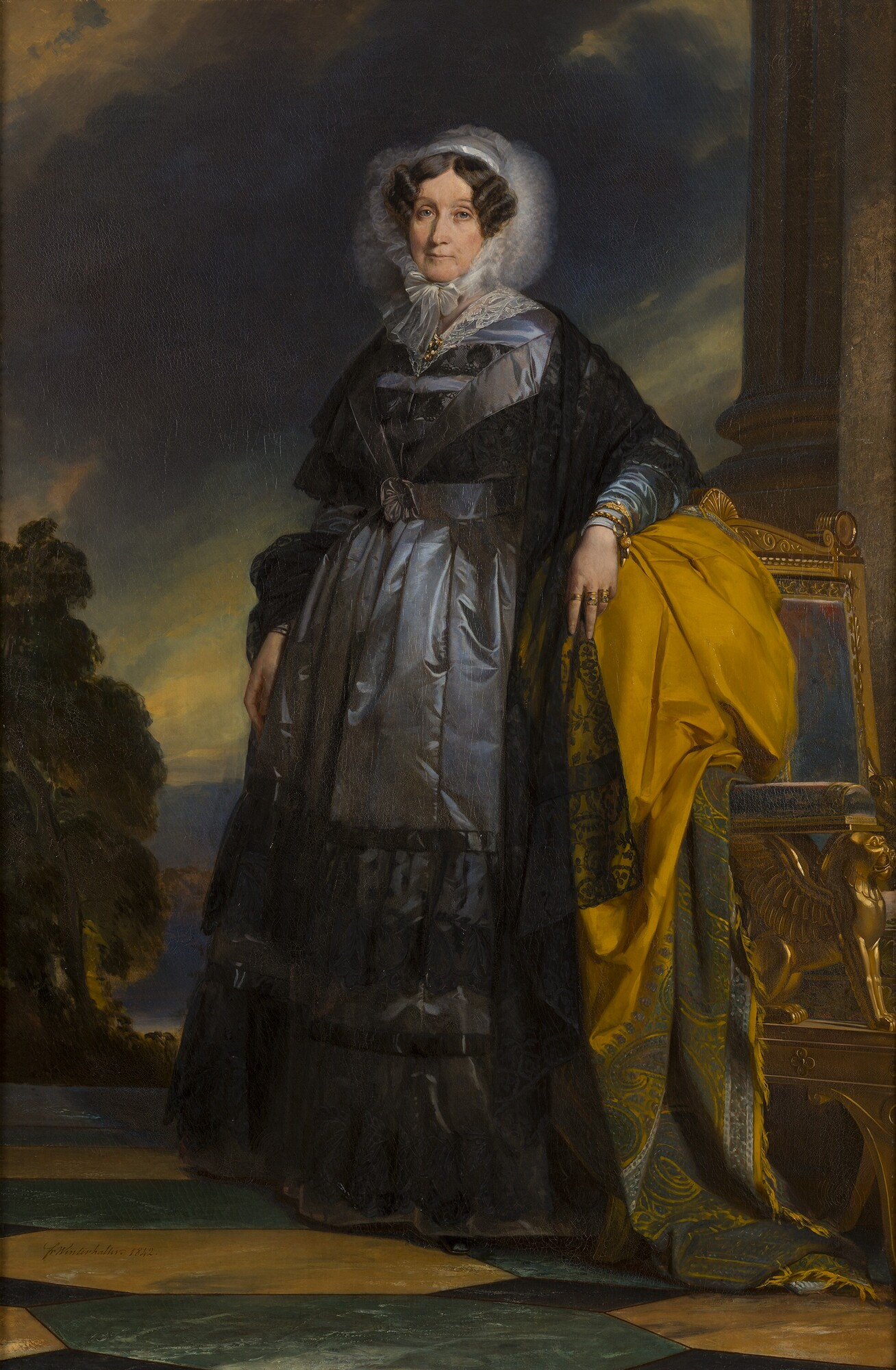
Portrait by Franz Xaver Winterhalter.

In 1792, she left France with de Genlis to the Austrian Netherlands and then to Switzerland, where she was placed in a convent in Bremgarten. During the Terror her father was guillotined, and her mother was banished to Spain. Sometime in the spring of 1794, Adélaïde moved to the home of her aunt, the Princess of Conti. They moved to Bavaria in 1798 and thereafter to Bratislava, and in 1801, she joined her mother in Barcelona in Spain. Her relationship with her mother was not good, as she disapproved of her mother's relationship with chancellor de Folmont.

On 25 November 1809, she and her mother attended the wedding of her brother Louis Philippe to Maria Amalia of Naples and Sicily in Palermo on Sicily. After the wedding, she did not return with her mother to Spain, but preferred to live with her brother and sister-in-law at Palazzo Orléans in Palermo. She was described as completely devoted to her brother and his family: united with her sister-in-law in their mutual love and concern for him, and a second mother to his children.

=== Return to France ===
After the fall of Napoleon in 1814, she returned with her brother and his family to Paris and settled with them in Palais-Royal. During the Bourbon Restoration, Palais-Royal was described as a center of high society social life in the capital, and reportedly, despite the fact that custom dictated that she as an unmarried "spinster" was expected to live in the background, it was she rather than her more reserved sister-in-law who took the role of hostess.

She was described as firm, intellectual, and frank, and she was a leading force in the family councils of the House of Orléans. Her loyalty to her brother has been described as due to the fact that, early separated from her family, she was treated with reserve during her exile because of the political actions of her father during the revolution, and her brother was the first person she could lavish her affection upon. Louis Philippe, in turn, relied upon her intelligence and loyalty, made her his confidant and listened to her advice, and consequently, she came to exert great political influence upon him. Being brought up a liberal, she supported the idea of a constitutional monarchy and a representative government.

She was not on good terms with the reigning Bourbon family; because of their reactionary ideas, and also because the hostility shown by them toward the Orléans line, and to her particularly by Marie Thérèse of France. Adélaïde rather than her brother are described as the active head of the Orléans fraction, and she had the active desire and ambition to make him monarch. In her apartment at Palais-Royal, she hosted a salon which became the center of liberal opposition toward the regime, and by use of her great personal fortune, she supported the liberal press and various political actors, artists, intellectuals and influential figures to gather support for her brother, among them Talleyrand.

=== July Monarchy ===
When Louis-Philippe became King of the French in the reign known as the July Monarchy (1830–1848), she was known as Madame Adélaïde. All her life, she was his loyal advisor or, in 19th century parlance, his "Egeria". It was she who, reportedly, encouraged him to accept the crown during the July Revolution, and her influence continued undisturbed during his reign. When tumult followed the publication of the Ordinances in 1830 and erupted in the July revolution in Paris, the Orléans family was at the country estate Neuilly.

Adélaïde convinced Louis-Philippe that the moment was right for him to place himself as the leader of the opposition against the absolute monarchy of Charles X, and present himself as the candidate of a constitutional monarchy, in between the unpopular absolute monarchy and the republicanism. In this, she defeated the view of her sister-in-law Maria Amalia, who was loyal to the reigning older branch. When rumors arrived that the royalists were going to arrest Louis-Philippe, he evacuated to Raincy and the children were sent to Villiers-Coterets, but Adélaïde and Maria Amalia remained at Neuilly. When a delegation reached Neuilly and offered Louis-Philippe the crown, Maria Amalia refused the offer on behalf of herself and her spouse as an insult, reproaching Scheffer and Thiers for insulting them by having made it. Adélaïde, however, accepted it with the argument that her brother would do anything to prevent the country he loved from anarchy. Thiers accepted the answer of Adélaïde rather than the one from Maria Amalia with the words: "Madame, you have given the crown to your family". After this, several other visits followed from people asking Louis-Philippe to accept the crown: to all, Maria Amalia answered that Louis-Philippe was an honest man and thus could not do it, while Adélaïde contradicted her by stating, that the offer should be made to Louis-Philippe by the chamber of deputies; and if he should hesitate, she would herself go to Paris and accept the crown for him. Soon after, the Chamber of Deputies called Louis-Philippe to Paris to formally present him their offer. It has been estimated that he accepted the crown largely because of Adélaïde.

At 6 August 1830, she and her sister-in-law were present at the tribune on the ceremony at the chambers in Paris when Louis Philippe was declared King of the French. She and her sister-in-law visited those who had been wounded during the revolution, and supported them financially. In October 1830, a mob broke into the Palais-Royal, and repeated attempts were made to execute the ministers of the former regime, which was refused by Louis-Philippe. When marshal Gerard remarked that it would be difficult to save them, she replied: "Well Monsieur, then we will all perish in the attempt". During his reign, Louis-Philippe visited her daily, discussed the matters of state and family with her, and followed her advice. Her death was therefore regarded as a great loss not only on an emotional but also a political scale.

Adélaïde d'Orléans died on 31 December 1847, two months before Louis Philippe's abdication on 24 February 1848. She is buried in the Orléans family necropolis in the Royal Chapel of Dreux.

== Ancestors ==
Ancestors of Adélaïde d'Orléans

8. Louis, Duke of Orléans
4. Louis Philippe I, Duke of Orléans
9. Auguste of Baden-Baden
2. Louis Philippe II, Duke of Orléans
10. Louis Armand II, Prince of Conti
5. Louise Henriette de Bourbon
11. Louise Élisabeth de Bourbon
1. Adélaïde d'Orléans
12. Louis Alexandre, Count of Toulouse
6. Louis Jean Marie, Duke of Penthièvre
13. Marie Victoire de Noailles
3. Louise Marie Adélaïde de Bourbon
14. Francesco III d'Este, Duke of Modena
7. Maria Teresa Felicitas d'Este
15. Charlotte Aglaé of Orléans

== Bibliography ==
- "Mademoiselle d'Orléans", The Edinburgh Annual Register (1816): 290–291.
