= Françoise Barbaroux =

Françoise Barbaroux (1 January 1761 – 3 November 1822) was mistress of Antoine Philippe, Duke of Montpensier. She had one child to Antoine Philippe, Jean-Antoine-Philippe Dentend (7 July 1797 – 5 March 1858), who became notary to the house of Orléans and in that role oversaw Louis Philippe's donation of his personal goods in 1830 before his accession.

Françoise was insulting to members of Antoine's family, then living in exile after the political tumult of the French Revolution. The Revolution's victims included Louis Philippe II, Duke of Orléans, Antoine's father. Madame Adélaïde of Orléans, Antoine's sister, wrote in several of her diary entries that Françoise was "Ugly". Her attempt to befriend Adélaïde failed as the princesse left for America. Antoine never saw his son, and Françoise left France for Belgium after Antoine's death. She remained there until her death in 1822.

Françoise Barbaroux' father, Francis Barbaroux, was the chamberlain to Louis XVIII.
