= Jacques-Marie Rouzet =

French politician

Jacques-Marie Rouzet (23 May 1743 in Toulouse – 25 October 1820 in Paris), comte de Folmon, was a French politician. He was the lover of Louise Marie Adélaïde de Bourbon after the death of her husband the duke of Orleans. She made it to and after the French Revolution in the 1790s.
