= Louis François Joseph, Prince of Conti =

Louis François II de Bourbon
- Prince of Conti
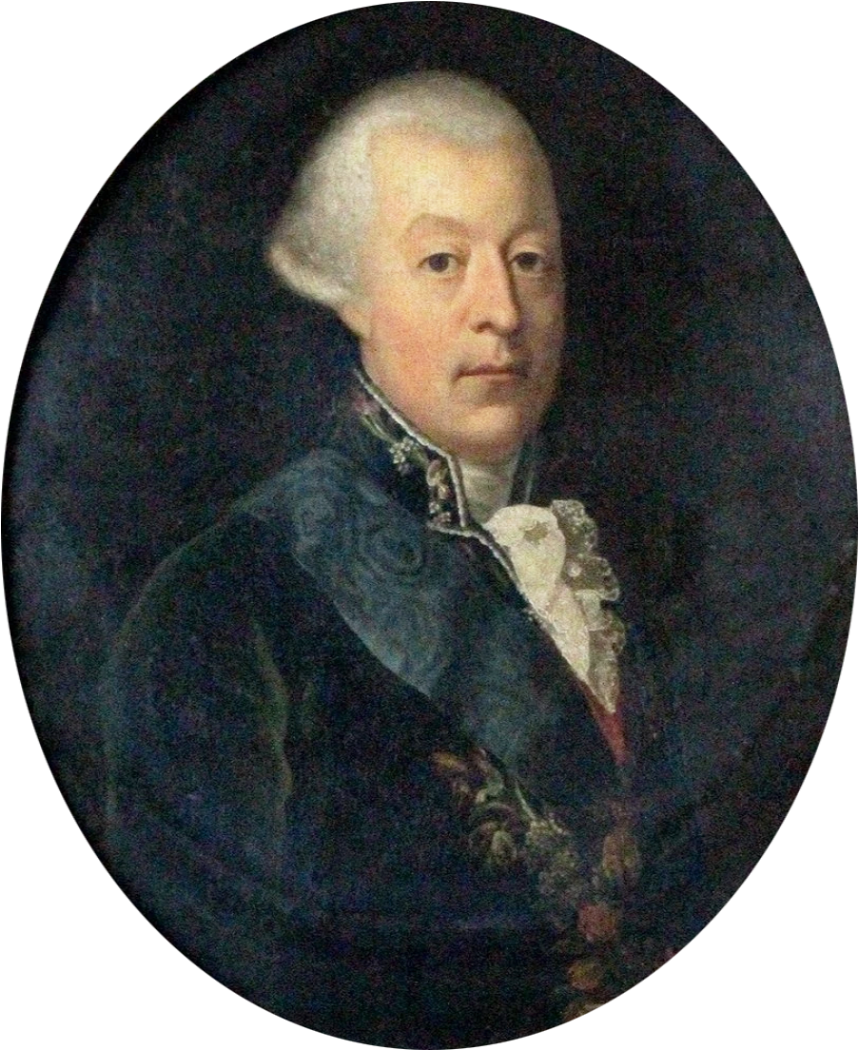

Prince of Conti
- Reign: 2 August 1776 – 13 March 1814
- Predecessor: Louis François
- Successor: none, title extinct
- Born: 1 September 1734; Hôtel de Conti, Paris, France
- Died: 13 March 1814 (aged 79); Barcelona, Spain
- Burial: 2 April 1844; Royal Chapel, Dreux, France
- Spouse: Maria Fortunata d'Este (m. 1759; died 1803)
Names
- Louis François Joseph de Bourbon
- House: Bourbon-Conti
- Father: Louis François, Prince of Conti
- Mother: Louise Diane d'Orléans
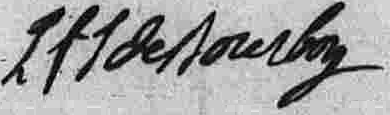
- Signature

Louis François Joseph de Bourbon or Louis François II, Prince of Conti (French pronunciation: [lwi fʁɑ̃swa ʒozɛf də buʁbɔ̃]; 1 September 1734 – 13 March 1814), was the last Prince of Conti, scion of a cadet branch of the House of Bourbon, whose senior branches ruled France until 1848.

Louis was the only child of his parents and lived a secluded childhood at his father's chateau, after the death of his mother in 1736. He later married his first cousin, with the union producing no children. During the French Revolution he stayed in France until 1797 when he was exiled to Spain where he died in 1814, less than a month before his family were restored to the throne of France; with his death the house of Bourbon-Conti became extinct.

== Biography ==
Born at the Hôtel de Conti (quai Conti) in Paris, on 1 September 1734, and baptised in the presence of the French king and queen, he succeeded his father, Louis François I de Bourbon, Prince of Conti, as head of the most junior branch of the House of Bourbon in 1776. His mother was Louise Diane d'Orléans, youngest daughter of Philippe II, Duke of Orléans, Regent of France during the minority of King Louis XV.

From birth, he was known as the comte de La Marche. His mother died on 26 September 1736, giving birth to a later child who did not survive. After her death, his father retired from the Royal court to the Château de L'Isle-Adam, pursuing his love of hunting, although he would later emerge to have a distinguished military career.

On 17 May 1750, Louis François was made a knight of the Order of the Holy Spirit at Versailles. During the Seven Years' War (1756–1763), he took part as a maréchal de camp in the Battle of Hastenbeck in July 1757, and in the Battle of Krefeld in June 1758.

Arms of Louis François Joseph

He married his first cousin, Maria Fortunata d'Este, fourth daughter of Francesco III d'Este, Duke of Modena and his wife, Charlotte Aglaé d'Orléans, who was his mother's older sister; as such, Louis François Joseph was the first cousin of Philippe Égalité, through his father.

The marriage contract was signed in Milan on 3 January 1759 by the French ambassador to the court of Turin. A wedding by proxy took place in Milan on 7 February of the same year and was celebrated in person on 27 February at Nangis-en-Brie in France. Maria Fortunata's father settled upon her a dowry of one million livres. In addition, upon her arrival in France her husband was given 150,000 livres by Louis XV. The young comtesse de La Marche was presented to the king and the rest of the royal family on 5 March 1759 by the Louise Élisabeth de Bourbon, Dowager Princess of Conti, Louis François' paternal grandmother. In 1770 they were one of twelve couples invited to dine with the newlyweds, Louis XVI and Marie Antoinette, in the Opéra of the Palace of Versailles, which had been constructed for the royal wedding.

The couple never had children. Louis François Joseph had two illegitimate children, born in 1761 and 1767, by Marie Anne Véronèse, known as Mademoiselle Coraline, previously a dancer at an Italian theatre. Among his other lovers was, notably, Anne Victoire Dervieux.

After the death of his father, he and his wife became officially separated on 12 June 1777, anticipating the extinction of the House of Bourbon-Conti. She retired to the Château de Triel. After fleeing France during the revolution, she travelled incognito as the comtesse de Triel, dying in Venice on 21 September 1803.

Pierre Beaumarchais noted in the preface to his 1778 play, The Marriage of Figaro (which satirised the aristocracy) that it was the late prince de Conti who requested the play be written, and Louis François Joseph's antics may have been the model for the misadventures of "Count Almaviva".

He took the side of Maupeou in the struggle between the chancellor and the parlements, and in 1788 declared that the integrity of the constitution must be maintained. He emigrated following the French Revolution, but refused to take part in plans for the invasion of France. He returned to his native country in 1790.

Arrested by order of the National Convention in 1793, he was acquitted, but was reduced to poverty by the confiscation of his possessions. He afterwards received a pension. In 1797, however, the Directoire decided to exile the last of the Bourbons. He was banished to Spain along with his few remaining relatives who still lived in France and had not already been killed in the revolution, including Bathilde d'Orléans, Duchess of Bourbon. Relegated to a place near Barcelona, he lived in poverty. Refusing to share in the plots of the Royalists, he lived an isolated existence in Barcelona until his death in 1814, whereupon the Princes of Conti became extinct.

He was first buried at the Iglesia de San Miguel in Barcelona prior to the Bourbon Restoration. During the reign of Louis Philippe I, he was removed from Saint-Michel and placed in the Chapelle royale de Dreux on 2 April 1844.

== Ancestry ==
Ancestors of Louis François Joseph, Prince of Conti

8. François Louis, Prince of Conti
4. Louis Armand II, Prince of Conti
9. Marie Thérèse de Bourbon
2. Louis François, Prince of Conti
10. Louis III, Prince of Condé
5. Louise Élisabeth de Bourbon
11. Louise Françoise de Bourbon
1. Louis François Joseph, Prince of Conti
12. Philippe I, Duke of Orléans
6. Philippe II, Duke of Orléans
13. Elizabeth Charlotte, Madame Palatine
3. Louise Diane d’Orléans
14. Louis XIV of France
7. Françoise Marie de Bourbon
15. Madame de Montespan

Preceded by Louis François I	Prince de Conti; 1776–1814	Extinct
