= Marie Anne Véronèse =

Franco-Italian actress

Maria Anna Veronese (French: Marie Anne Véronèse) (died 1782) was a Franco/Italian actress active at the Comédie-Italienne in Paris. She became the mistress of Louis François Joseph, Prince of Conti, by whom she had two illegitimate children, born in 1761 and 1767.

Nicknamed "Mademoiselle Coraline", Anna Veronese was the daughter of Italian Pantalone-actor Carlo Veronese and the sister of actress Giacoma Antonia Veronese (d. 1768). She debuted with her sister at the Comédie-Italienne in Paris in 1744. The Veronese sisters are considered two of the most notable interpreters of the soubrette-parts of the commedia dell'arte. They were known as Corallina (Coraline in French) and Camilla, respectively, after their standard parts. Anna was particularly known for her quick costume changes.
