= Francesco III d'Este =

Duke of Modena and Reggio from 1737 to 1780

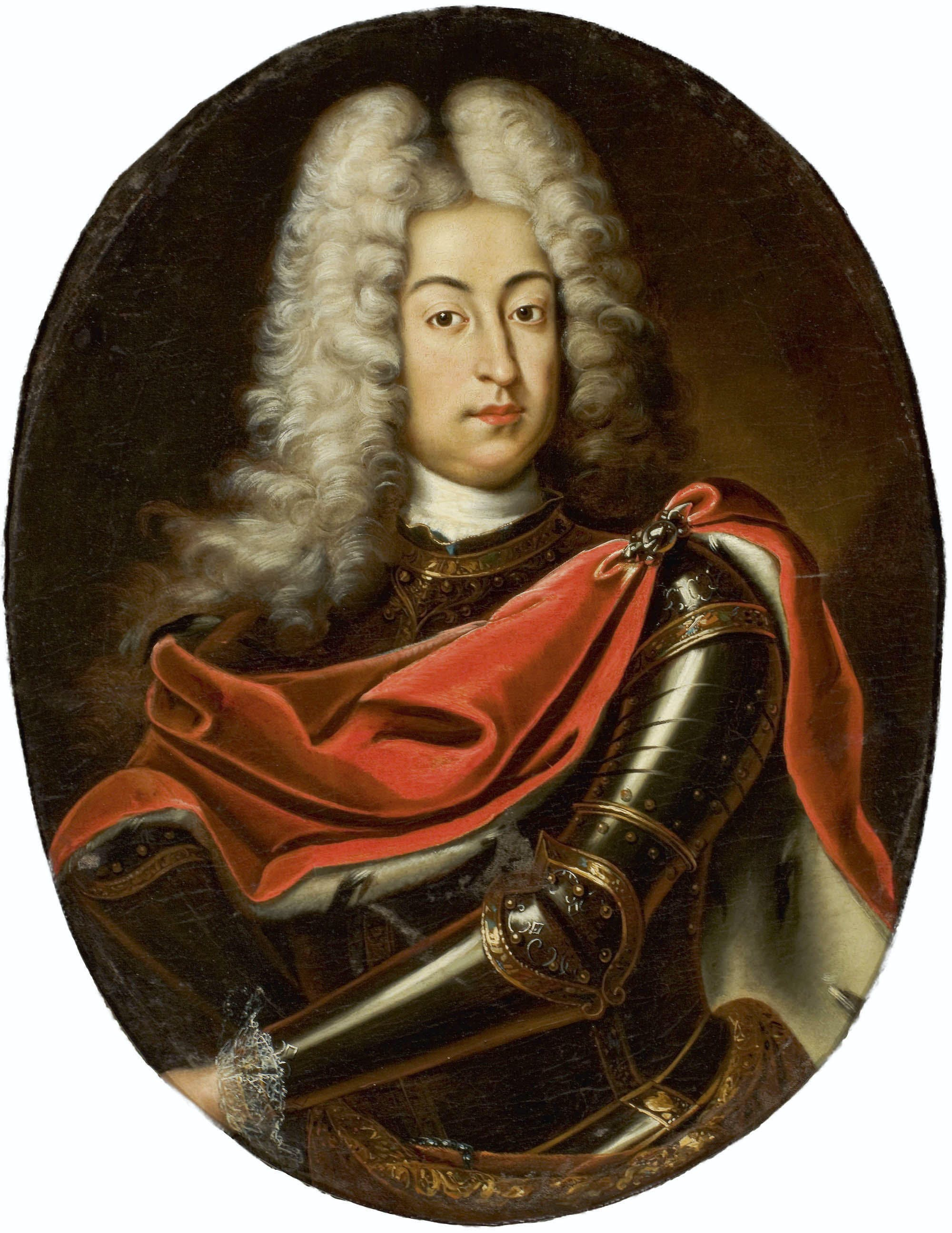

Duke of Modena and Reggio
- Reign: 26 October 1737 – 22 February 1780
- Predecessor: Rinaldo d'Este
- Successor: Ercole III d'Este
- Born: 2 July 1698; Ducal Palace of Modena, Duchy of Modena and Reggio
- Died: 22 February 1780 (aged 81); Palazzo Estense, Varese, Duchy of Milan
- Spouse: Charlotte Aglaé d'Orléans (m. 1721; died 1761)
- Issue Detail: Maria Teresa, Duchess of Penthièvre; Ercole III, Duke of Modena; Princess Matilde d'Este; Maria Fortunata, Princess of Conti; Benedetto Filippo, Abbot of Anchin
Names
- Francesco Maria d'Este
- House: Este
- Father: Rinaldo d'Este, Duke of Modena
- Mother: Charlotte of Brunswick-Lüneburg
- Religion: Roman Catholicism

Francesco III d'Este (Francesco Maria; 2 July 1698 – 22 February 1780) was Duke of Modena and Reggio from 1737 until his death.

== Biography ==
Francesco was born in Modena, the son of Rinaldo d'Este, Duke of Modena, and Duchess Charlotte of Brunswick-Lüneburg.

During his reign, the duchy was bankrupted by the Wars of the Spanish, Polish, and Austrian Successions. As a result, Francesco was forced to sell the most precious artworks of the Estense Gallery. He was a careful administrator but most of the duchy's financial policy was in the hands of the Austrian plenipotentiary, Beltrame Cristiani.

Among his measures, the urban renovation of Modena and the construction of the Via Vandelli, connecting the city to the Tuscan Duchy of Massa and Carrara (belonging to his daughter-in-law Maria Teresa Cybo-Malaspina and destined to be incorporated into the Este States), and to the Mediterranean Sea.

Francesco also was the interim Governor of the Duchy of Milan between 1754 and 1771, being also invested in 1765 with the non-hereditary lordship of Varese, a fief specially created for him by Empress Maria Theresa. There he died in 1780 in the Palazzo Estense he had built.

His son Ercole succeeded him as the sovereign of the Duchy of Modena and Reggio.

== Family and children ==
In 1721, Francesco married Charlotte Aglaé d'Orléans (1700–1761), a daughter of Philippe d'Orléans, Duke of Orléans and Françoise Marie de Bourbon (legitimized daughter of Louis XIV and Madame de Montespan), and had ten children. Together, they resided in the Ducal Palace of Rivalta.

He acted as proxy groom for his sister Enrichetta d'Este in 1728 who was marrying Antonio Farnese, Duke of Parma.

After his first wife's death, he remarried twice more morganatically to Teresa Castelbarco (1704-1768) and Renata Teresa d'Harrach (1721-1788).

His granddaughter Maria Beatrice d'Este, Duchess of Massa was the last scion of the House of Este of Modena, whose male line became extinct with her.

=== Matrimonial agreements ===
Given that in the Este States the Salic law was in force which prohibited women from succeeding to the throne, after the premature death of his fourth son Benedetto Filippo (though directed to an ecclesiastical career) in 1751 and, two years later, that of his only grandson in the male line, Rinaldo Francesco, just aged 4 months, the duke had to surrender to the idea that extinction was looming large over the house of Este. Maria Beatrice was now the sole surviving child of his sole surviving son, Ercole Rinaldo (the future Duke Ercole III), and it was clear that the latter would not father any more legitimate offspring because he and his wife, Maria Teresa Cybo-Malaspina, were now irretrievably separated.

Therefore, Francesco III set out to prevent his ancient Este States, as imperial fiefs, from being declared "vacant" (heirless) in future and then simply absorbed by the Empire, just as, almost two centuries earlier, Ferrara, a papal fief held to be vacant by Pope Clement VIII, had been confiscated by the Apostolic Chamber. Previously he had already turned to the court of Great Britain for advice and help: King George II was a distant maternal cousin of his and Francesco looked to him as a sort of head of the family given the shared ancestral origins of the two dynasties from the House of Welf. Thus, in the same year 1753, with the mediation and guarantee of George II, two simultaneous treaties (one public and one secret) were concluded between the House of Este and the House of Austria. In virtue of them, Archduke Leopold of Habsburg-Lorraine, Empress Maria Theresa's ninth-born child and third son, and three-year-old Maria Beatrice d'Este were engaged, being entrusted with the lofty task of setting up a new ruling house that would bring together the names of both their families. The treaties also stipulated that Leopold should be designated by Francesco III as heir for the imperial investiture as Duke of Modena and Reggio in the event of extinction of the Este male line. It was intended that the new house should rule the Este States as a separate entity from the other Habsburg domains. In the meantime, Francesco would cover the office of governor of Milan ad interim, which was destined for the archduke.

In 1761, however, following the death of an older brother of his, Leopold moved up one place in the line of succession, becoming heir to the throne of the Grand Duchy of Tuscany as provided for the second son of the imperial couple, and even taking over from his late brother as candidate to the Infanta Maria Luisa of Spain's hand; whereupon the 1753 treaties evidently became anachronistic and had to be revised. In 1763, despite the harsh opposition of Ercole Rinaldo, the two families agreed to simply replace the name of Leopold with that of his next junior brother, Archduke Ferdinand Karl of Habsburg-Lorraine, who had not yet been born at the time of the signing of the treaties and was four years younger than his betrothed. In January 1771 the Perpetual Diet of Regensburg ratified Ferdinand's future investiture and, in October, Maria Beatrice and he finally got married in Milan, thus giving rise to the new House of Austria-Este. Francesco III ceded to the archduke the post of governor of Milan and the new archducal couple settled in the Lombard capital where they lived the next about 25 years producing a large offspring of ten children. In 1815, their son Francesco IV would be placed at the head of the restored Duchy of Modena and Reggio by the Congress of Vienna.

== Issue ==
1. Alfonso d'Este (18 November 1723 – 16 June 1725) died in infancy.
2. Francesco Constantino d'Este (22 November 1724 – 16 June 1725) died in infancy.
3. Maria Teresa Felicitas d'Este (6 October 1726 – 30 April 1754) married Louis Jean Marie de Bourbon, Duke of Penthièvre and had issue.
4. Ercole III d'Este, Duke of Modena (22 November 1727 – 14 October 1803) married Maria Teresa Cybo-Malaspina, Duchess of Massa and had issue.
5. Matilde d'Este (7 February 1729 – 14 November 1803) died unmarried.
6. Beatrice d'Este (14 July 1730 – 12 July 1731) died in infancy.
7. Beatrice d'Este (24 November 1731 – 3 April 1736) died in infancy.
8. Maria Fortunata d'Este (24 November 1731 – 21 September 1803) married Louis François de Bourbon, Prince of Conti, no issue.
9. Benedetto Filippo d'Este (30 September 1736 – 16 September 1751) died unmarried.
10. Maria Elisabetta Ernestina d'Este (12 February 1741 – 4 August 1774) died unmarried.

== Ancestry ==
Ancestors of Francesco III d'Este

16. Cesare d'Este, Duke of Modena
8. Alfonso III d'Este, Duke of Modena
17. Virginia de' Medici
4. Francesco I d'Este, Duke of Modena
18. Charles Emmanuel I, Duke of Savoy
9. Isabella of Savoy
19. Catherine Michelle of Spain
2. Rinaldo d'Este, Duke of Modena
20. Carlo Barberini, Duke of Monterotondo
10. Taddeo Barberini, Prince of Palestrina
21. Costanza Magalotti
5. Lucrezia Barberini
22. Filippo I Colonna, Prince of Paliano
11. Anna Colonna, Princess of Paliano
23. Lucrezia Tomacelli
1. Francesco III d'Este, Duke of Modena
24. William the Younger, Duke of Brunswick-Lüneburg
12. George, Duke of Brunswick-Calenberg
25. Dorothea of Denmark
6. John Frederick, Duke of Brunswick-Calenberg
26. Louis V, Landgrave of Hesse-Darmstadt
13. Anne Eleonore of Hesse-Darmstadt
27. Magdalene of Brandenburg
3. Charlotte Felicitas of Brunswick
28. Frederick V, Elector Palatine
14. Edward, Count Palatine of Simmern
29. Elizabeth Stuart
7. Benedicta Henrietta of the Palatinate
30. Charles Gonzaga, Duke of Mantua
15. Anne Gonzaga
31. Catherine of Mayenne

== Sources ==
- Santaliestra, Laura Oliván; Anderson, Roberta; Suner, Suna, eds. (2021). Gender and Diplomacy: Women and Men in European Embassies from the 15th to the 18th Century. Hollitzer Wissenschaftsverlag. ISBN 9783990128350.
- Prothero, George Walter; Ward, Adolphus William; Leathes, Stanley, eds. (1911). The Cambridge Modern History. Vol. XIII. Cambridge at the University Press.

Francesco III d'Este House of Este Born: 2 July 1698 Died: 22 February 1780
Regnal titles
Preceded by Rinaldo III	Duke of Modena and Reggio; 1737–1780	Succeeded by Ercole III
Government offices
Preceded by Gian Luca Pallavicini	Governor of the Duchy of Milan; 1754–1771	Succeeded by Archduke Ferdinand of Austria-Este
