= Charlotte Aglaé d'Orléans =

Duchess of Modena and Reggio from 1737 to 1761

- Duchess of Modena and Reggio
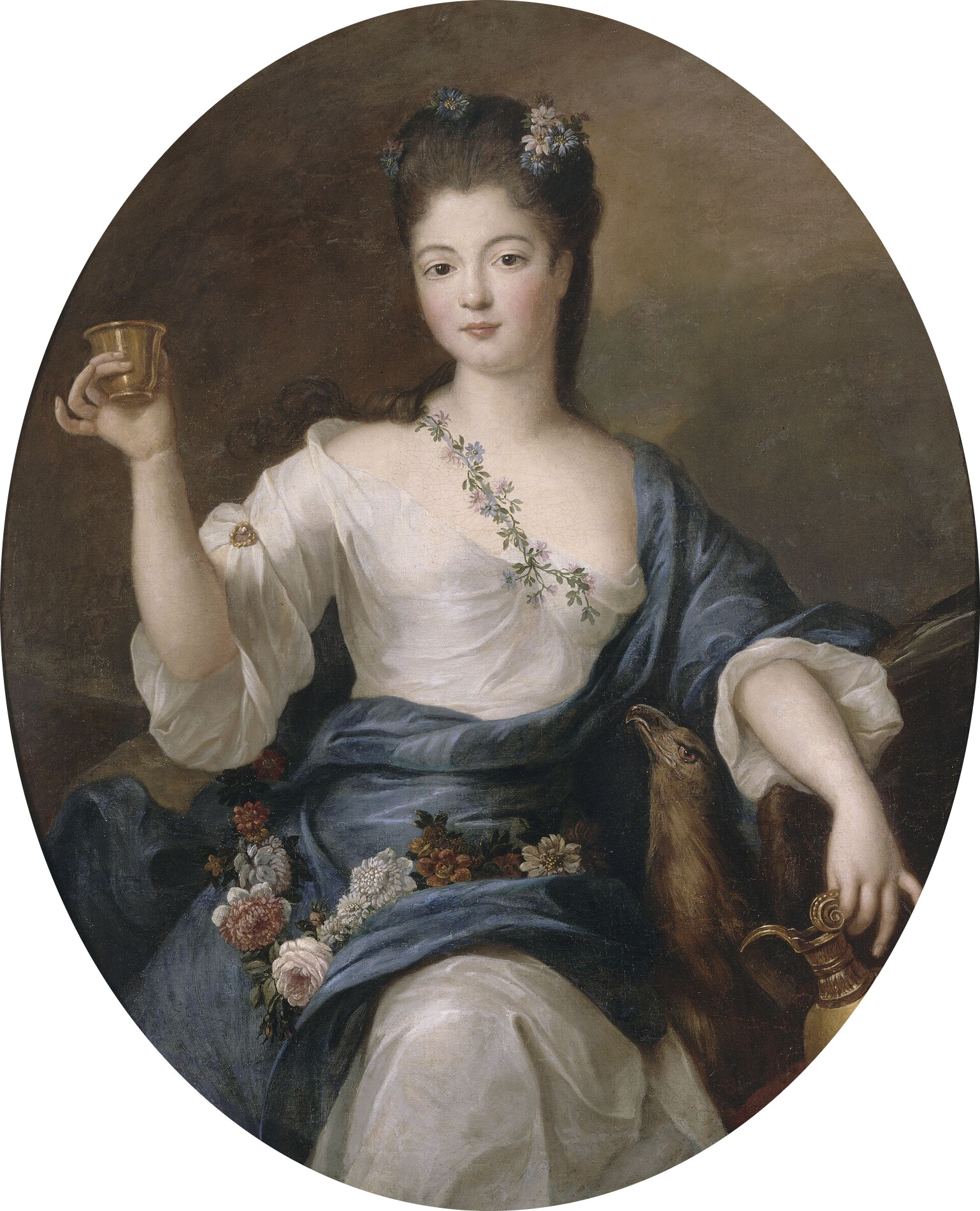
- Charlotte Aglaé as Hebe, by Pierre Gobert

Duchess consort of Modena and Reggio
- Tenure: 26 October 1737 – 19 January 1761
- Born: 22 October 1700; Palais-Royal, Paris, France
- Died: 19 January 1761 (aged 60); Petit-Luxembourg, Paris, France
- Burial: Val-de-Grâce, Paris, France
- Spouse: Francesco III, Duke of Modena (m. 1721)
- Issue Detail: Maria Teresa, Duchess of Penthièvre; Ercole III, Duke of Modena; Princess Matilde d'Este; Maria Fortunata, Princess of Conti
- House: Orléans
- Father: Philippe II, Duke of Orléans
- Mother: Françoise Marie de Bourbon
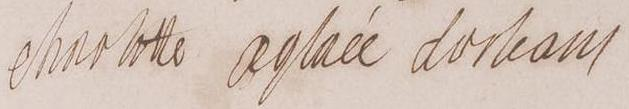
- Signature

Charlotte Aglaé d'Orléans (22 October 1700 – 19 January 1761) was Duchess of Modena and Reggio by marriage to Francesco III d'Este. She was the third daughter of Philippe II, Duke of Orléans, and his wife, Françoise-Marie de Bourbon. She was born a princesse du sang, and had ten children, including Ercole III d'Este, Duke of Modena.

== Youth ==
Charlotte Aglaé d'Orléans was born at the Palais-Royal, her parents' residence in Paris. She was one of eight children of Philippe II, Duke of Orléans, nephew of King Louis XIV of France, and Françoise Marie de Bourbon, the latter's legitimized daughter. As a young child, Charlotte Aglaé was known at court as Mademoiselle de Valois. Her second name comes from the youngest of the three Greek Charites: Aglaea.

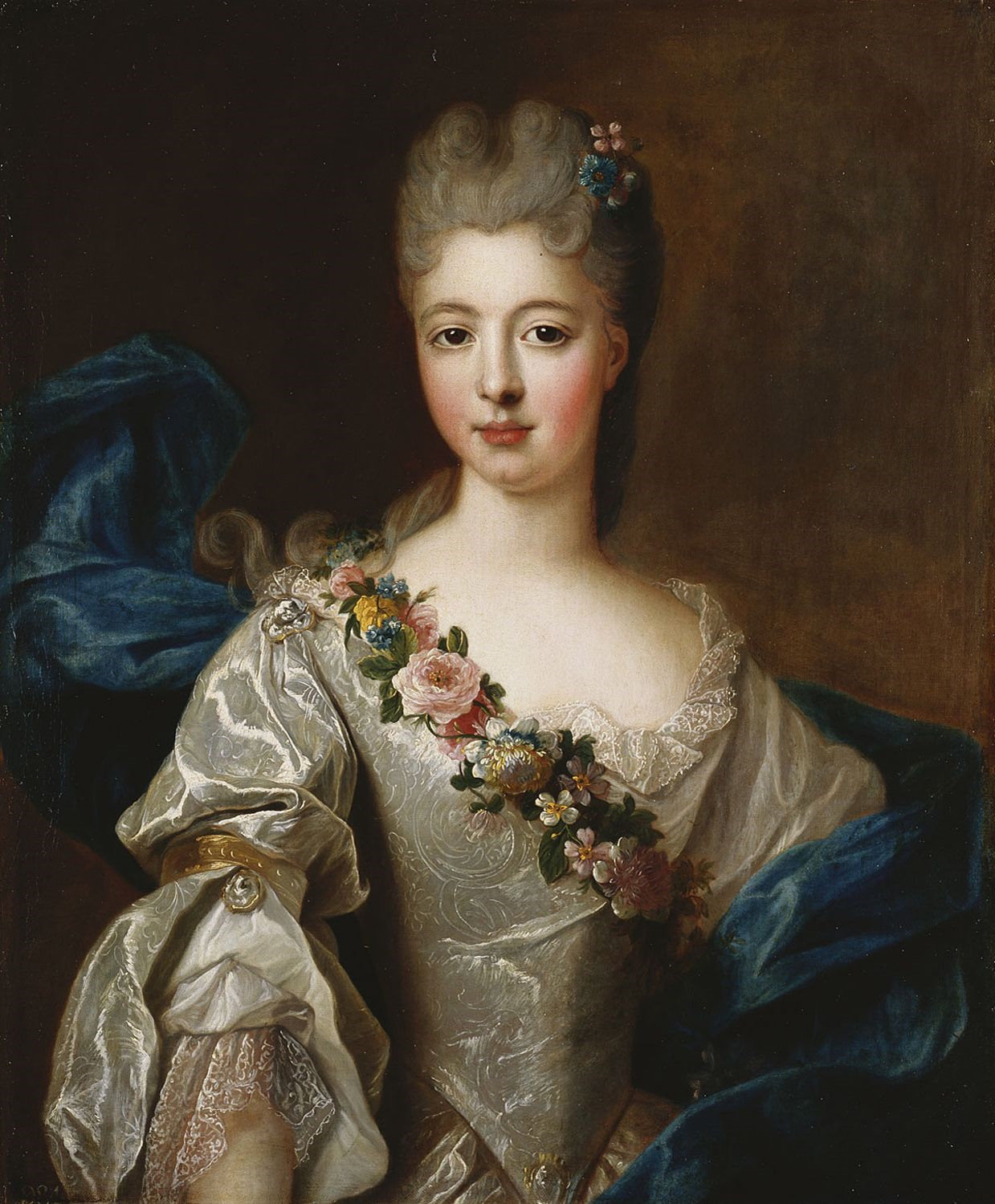
Portrait by Pierre Gobert, c. 1716-1718

At a young age, she and her elder sister Louise Adélaïde were placed in the Abbey of Chelles, which her sister would years later 'rule' as abbess. In 1714, she was sent by her parents to Val-de-Grâce Abbey. At that time, her marriage became the preoccupation of her family. Her elder sister, the Duchess of Berry, suggested that she marry the young Louis Armand de Bourbon, Prince of Conti, the son of François Louis, Prince of Conti and his wife, Marie Thérèse de Bourbon, but Louis XIV would not give his consent to the union.

In 1715, Charlotte Aglaé moved into the Palais-Royal with her family. The following year, her mother suggested her marriage to her first cousin, Louis Auguste de Bourbon, prince de Dombes, son of her uncle Louis Auguste de Bourbon, duc du Maine, but Charlotte Aglaé refused. Shortly thereafter, Charlotte Aglaé went to live at the Château de Saint-Cloud with her paternal grandmother, Elizabeth Charlotte of the Palatinate, the Dowager Duchess of Orléans, who was known as Madame at court. Her grandmother made a pen portrait of her granddaughter at this time:

Mademoiselle de Valois is not, in my opinion, pretty, and yet occasionally she does not look ugly. She has something like charms, for her eyes, her colour and her skin are good. She has white teeth, a large, ill-looking nose, and one prominent tooth, which when she laughs has a bad effect

The Dowager Duchess of Orléans also said of her granddaughter that:

She has a good deal of the Mortemart family in her, and is as much like the Duchess of Sforza, the sister of Montespan

Her cousin, Louis Henri, Duke of Bourbon, proposed to her on behalf of his younger brother Charles de Bourbon, comte de Charolais. Charlotte Aglaé is said to have seriously considered the proposal but her parents refused outright.

In 1718, Charlotte Aglaé began a romantic affair with Louis François Armand du Plessis, duc de Richelieu. In 1719, the duke was arrested and jailed in Hem, Nord, in connection with his participation in the Cellamare Conspiracy. Charlotte Aglaé visited the duke several times in prison. Wishing to marry him, she urged her father, the regent, to pardon him.

Her elder cousin, Louise Anne de Bourbon, was another of the promiscuous Richelieu's conquests. The cousins, who had never been very close, became bitter enemies due to their simultaneous romantic involvement with the womanising duke. This enmity continued long after each amorous affair had ended. The young Louise-Anne was considered the most attractive daughter of Louis III, Prince of Condé.

== Marriage ==
Against Charlotte Aglaé's wishes, the regent accepted an offer of marriage for his daughter that was proffered by Rinaldo d'Este, Duke of Modena, for his son and heir, Prince Francesco III d'Este. Earlier projects to marry Charlotte Aglaé to either an English prince or to Charles Emmanuel III of Sardinia had failed. Her grandmother is known to have written to Charlotte Aglaé's aunt, Anne Marie d'Orléans, Queen of Sicily, on the marriage proposal. As a pre-condition to the liberation of Richelieu, her lover, it was decided that she would marry the heir of Modena.

According to her grandmother's writings, her future husband had fallen in love with the young Charlotte Aglaé upon, "the mere sight of her portrait".

Few expected the marriage to succeed, as Charlotte Aglaé had no desire to leave France. Her distant cousin, Marguerite Louise d'Orléans, who had previously been wedded against her will to Cosimo III de' Medici, Grand Duke of Tuscany in 1661, had suffered through a disastrous marriage. Eventually, Marguerite was forced to return to France in disgrace. People assumed that the same fate awaited Charlotte Aglaé. The grand duchess noticed the similarities between herself and her younger cousin and, unable to deal with the situation, refused to speak to Charlotte Aglaé about her impending nuptials:

the Grand Duchess of Tuscany says that she will not see Mademoiselle de Valois nor speak to her, knowing very well what Italy is, and believing that Mademoiselle de Valois will not be able to reconcile herself to it. She is afraid that if her niece should ever return to France they will say, "There is the second edition of the Grand Duchess".

The original date for the marriage was 25 January 1720, but this date was postponed until the next month due to an oversight by the Bishop of Modena. Despite this, the marriage certificate was signed on 31 January.

On 11 February 1720, a proxy marriage was performed at the Tuileries Palace. Her brother, the Duke of Chartres stood in for his future brother-in-law, while her younger sister Louise Élisabeth held her train. After this, there was a banquet at the Palais Royal where the young king Louis XV attended and presented his gifts to the new Hereditary Princess of Modena.

=== Modena ===
Charlotte Aglaé set off first for Antibes and next Genoa. Arriving in Reggio on 20 June, she met her father-in-law, husband and brother-in-law for the first time. The formal wedding ceremony took place on 21 June 1720 in Modena. Charlotte Aglaé received an enormous dowry of 1.8 million livres, half of which was contributed in the name of the young king, Louis XV, on orders of the Regent. From her adopted country, she received a trousseau consisting of diamonds and portraits of her future husband.

As her husband's mother had died in 1710, the Hereditary Princess was the most senior princess in Modena. Although by rank she was neither a fille nor petite-fille de France, Charlotte Aglaé was allowed to keep the Duchess of Villars in attendance as a lady-in-waiting at the Modenese court. The Duchess of Villars was there to represent the French king.

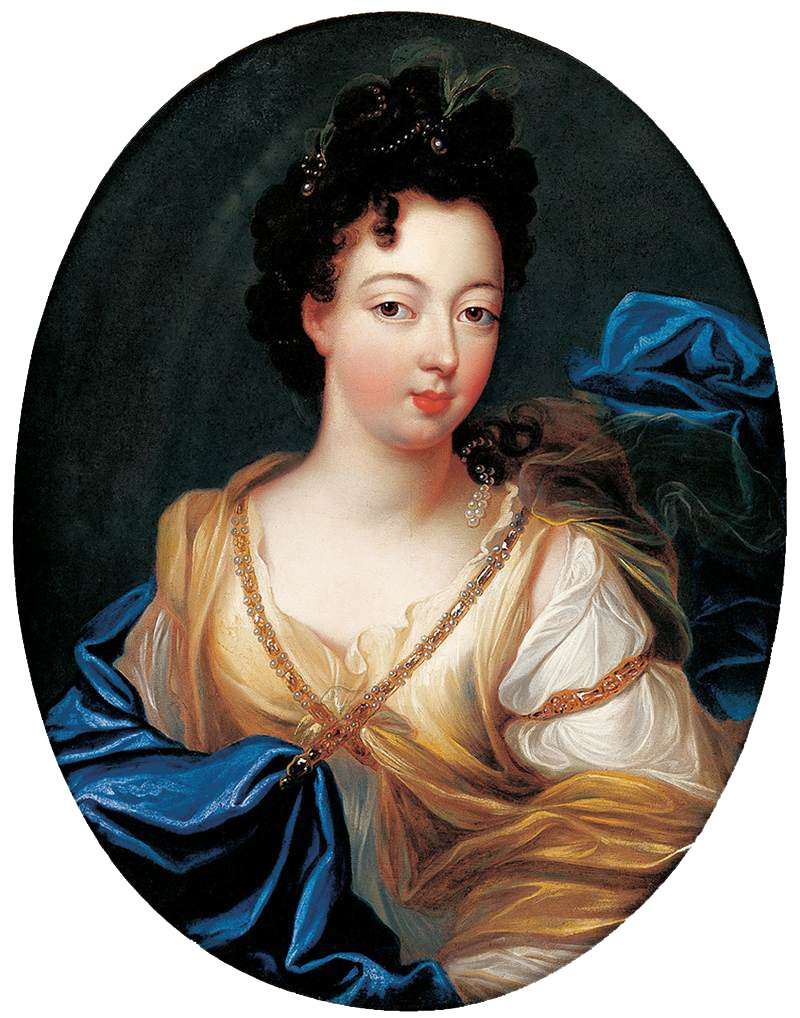
Charlotte Aglaé by Pierre Gobert before her marriage

Everyone was expected to rise very early and attend Mass; dinner was served at an hour when many of the fashionable ladies of Paris and Versailles were sipping their morning chocolate; the usual occupation of the ducal family in the afternoon was a carriage ride, the carriages proceeding at an almost funeral pace; supper was at eight o'clock; and ten was bed time. Her boredom was only agitated when her father-in-law's favourite, the Count of Salvatico (an admirer of Charlotte Aglaé) was made Grand Master of Ceremonies. The count used his new position to claim the right of entering the princess's apartments at any time he wished. He intercepted her mail from relatives and friends in France, and actually had the audacity to stop delivery of several letters from her father, in order to create the impression that she had quarrelled with the Regent. In addition, he furnished blind and lame horses for her carriage and pewter for her table. In short, he tried to annoy her as much as possible.

In order to distract herself from the boring court, Charlotte Aglaé began holding small private gatherings in her apartments where she would entertain a small circle attended by her husband's three surviving sisters including Enrichetta d'Este, future Duchess of Parma. In September 1720, Charlotte Aglaé caught smallpox and, according to her grandmother, the last sacraments were administered. She called her French confessor, Colibeaux, to her bedside, and, handing him a casket, directed him to secretly burn all the papers which it contained. Probably among these papers were the love-letters which she had received from the Duke of Richelieu. During this illness, her husband was forbidden to see her; he stayed at his villa at Sassuolo until she recovered. Soon the marriage was criticised for not having produced any children, and blame fell upon the then recovering princess.

This criticism of the couple led them to flee to Verona for a short spell, much to the annoyance of her father-in-law. In retaliation, he cut off the postal service to the prince and princess in the hope that they would return. It was at this time that Charlotte first asked her father to let her return to France and live at Versailles with her family. This request only served to complicate marriage plans already under way for her younger sisters Louise Élisabeth and Philippine Élisabeth. In December 1723, while she was away in Italy, her father died. Her younger brother, Louis, succeeded to the Orléans titles.

Following her father's death, Charlotte Aglaé and her husband were asked to stay at the prince's villa at Rivalta, in a sort of private exile away from the court of Modena. In 1727, her former lover, the Duke of Richelieu, visited her in Modena in disguise, and the two resumed their romantic affair. When this was exposed, her husband allowed her to return to France in temporary disgrace. She returned to Modena later in 1727. The next year, 1728, she and her husband fled to Genoa; five years later in 1733, she returned to France where she found herself unwelcome; her mother, who had never liked her, was cold; her closest friend in the family was her illegitimate half-brother, the chevalier d'Orléans. In 1733, the War of the Polish Succession broke out. Despite her father-in-law declaring himself neutral, the ducal family still found their home being occupied by foreign armies.

As a result, the Duke of Modena went to Bologna while his son and Charlotte Aglaé travelled to France where they stayed in Lyons. Her mother, trying to keep her scandalous daughter away from Paris and Versailles, wrote to the Duke of Modena to make sure that Charlotte Aglaé and her husband stayed in Lyons. Her younger brother, Louis, Duke of Orléans, did the same. The next year, after much correspondence on her husband's part with the French court, the two were allowed to go to Paris incognito. They arrived on 12 March 1734. Her arrival at the Palais-Royal was a cold one. She met her mother and brother, neither of whom even bothered to offer her any accommodation or refreshment.

Initially, she and her husband lived at the Hôtel de Luynes Rue du Colombier (where her son Benedetto was born), not far from the Abbey of Saint-Germain-des-Prés. Soon after, they moved to the Hôtel de Lyon, in the Rue des Petits-Champs, which was much closer to her brother's residence, the Palais-Royal. Her brother gave her the small sum of 25,000 écus during her stay in Paris, but he refused to help in any other way.

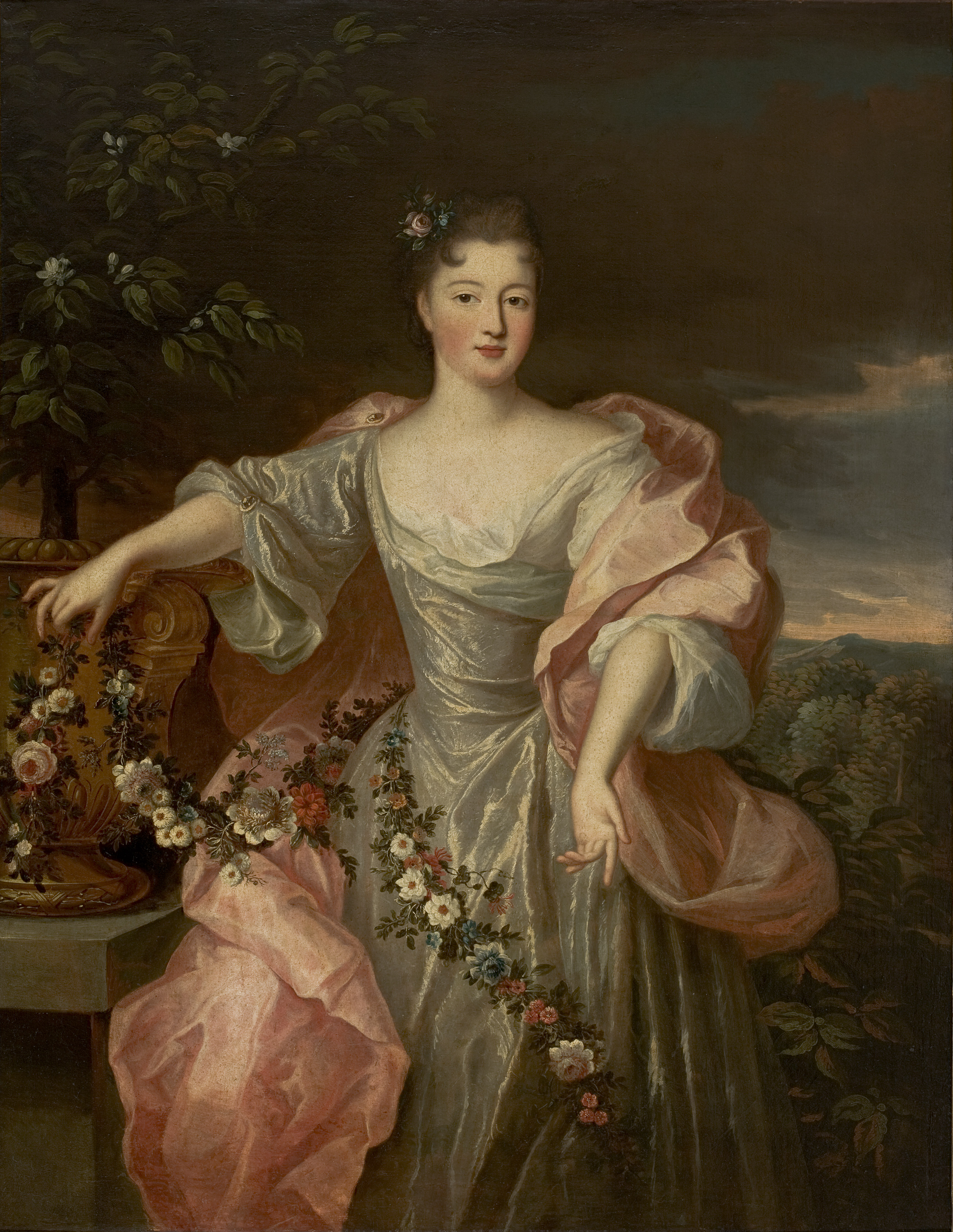
Charlotte Aglaé again by Gobert

In 1735 her husband was recalled to Modena on matters of state. Charlotte Aglaé used her looks to influence her cousin, the young king, to let her stay after her husband's departure. This was done on the condition that she stay away from the court and live at the Val-de-Grâce convent of her childhood. As a result of manipulations by her mother and brother, she was never allowed to be received by the queen, Maria Leszczyńska. It was always maintained that such a public event would cause too much damage by exposing her incognito status. Her husband returned in May 1736.

Much to the annoyance of her family, Charlotte Aglaé and her husband remained in Paris. A dramatic argument followed in which Charlotte Aglaé and her sister, the Dowager Queen of Spain, squabbled over a question of etiquette. When her family took the Dowager Queen's side completely, Charlotte Aglaé became even further isolated. Sometime after, her husband had to go to Hungary. Charlotte Aglaé persuaded Cardinal Fleury to convince the young king to once again let her stay in Paris and not depart with her husband. The cardinal also convinced her family into accepting her continued presence in France.

Upon the death of her father-in-law in 1737, her husband became Francesco III, reigning Duke of Modena. Despite Charlotte Aglaé's new rank as the wife of a Sovereign Prince, she did not receive any better treatment in France. Family relations were further worsened when Charlotte Aglaé and her brother engaged in a trivial lawsuit regarding some family property. In June 1739, she reluctantly returned to Modena. In an attempt to make the place fashionable, she promoted the arts. She introduced a French-style theatre to Modena, which was a great success. She also added a corps de ballet to the city in which she took great pride. Her husband also made several additions to the Ducal Palace of Modena, including a large hall which was an exact replica of one at the Tuileries Palace. During their marriage, her husband amassed one of the finest portrait collections in Italy.

In 1741, her eldest son, Ercole, the ducal heir, married Maria Teresa Cybo-Malaspina (1725–1790). She was the daughter of Alderano Cibo-Malsapina, Duke of Massa and his wife Ricciardia Gonzaga di Novellara. Maria Teresa had become Duchess of Massa and Cararra in her own right in 1731 upon the death of her father. The young couple would later have two children who survived into adulthood. In 1743, due to the War of the Austrian Succession, Charlotte Aglaé was forced to ask for permission to return to Paris with her eldest daughter, Maria Teresa. This request was at first ignored but help came from her old lover, the Duke of Richelieu, who used his influence over Louis XV's current mistress, the Duchess of Châteauroux, to gain the necessary approval. When she arrived in Paris, she was greeted with all of the honours owed her due to her rank.

She was now a stout, red-faced woman, looking rather like her father. She lived on the Rue de Grenelle in the Faubourg Saint-Germain and became a friend of the Duchess of Châteauroux.

Upon the death of Duchess of Châteauroux, her influence dwindled for a time. In 1744, however, she was able to secure for her daughter, Princess Maria Teresa of Modena, a marriage to the Duke of Penthièvre, the richest noble in France. Louis Jean Marie de Bourbon, was Charlotte Aglaé's younger first cousin and was the heir to the vastly wealthy House of Bourbon-Penthièvre. The couple married happily in 1744 and had two surviving children. Their eldest child, the Prince de Lamballe, married Maria Teresa Luigia di Savoia, the future friend of Marie Antoinette, in 1767. Their second child, Louise Marie Adélaïde de Bourbon, married the Duke of Chartres, (known as Philippe Égalité during the French Revolution of 1789) and later became the mother of Louis Philippe I, King of the French.

At Maria Teresa's death in 1754, Monsieur de Penthièvre travelled to Italy where another of Charlotte Aglaé's daughters was proposed, the Princess Matilde. Penthièvre refused and never remarried; her daughter would also remain unmarried.

This advantageous marriage by her daughter allowed Charlotte Aglaé to have some say in French politics for a short period. Things began to change when Madame de Pompadour was presented at court in 1745. After the Treaty of Aix-la-Chapelle was signed in 1748, Charlotte Aglaé did not return to Modena. By 1754, it seemed that she had lost her flair at Versailles. Despite this, she did manage to secure a French marriage for her fourth daughter, Princess Maria Fortunata. Maria Fortunata, like her older sister, married one of her mother's cousins, Louis François II de Bourbon, Prince of Conti. He was the last prince de Conti. The marriage proved very unhappy, to the point where the groom did not want to live any longer with his wife.

Charlotte Aglaé finally returned to Modena in 1759. There, she discovered that her husband had eloped with one Marchesa Simonetti, a widow of 60. She decided to leave the old couple to their own devices and began travelling extensively around Europe. She died in Paris at the Petit Luxembourg, where her two of her sisters, the old Duchess of Berry and Dowager Queen of Spain, had previously died. Her heart was placed in the Church of Val-de-Grâce but was removed and lost during the French Revolution. After her death, her husband remarried twice more morganatically to Teresa Castelberco and Renata Teresa d'Harrach.

Her body was buried at the Val-de-Grâce Abbey where she had spent some of her youth.

== Issue ==
1. Alfonso d'Este (18 November 1723 – 16 June 1725) died in infancy.
2. Francesco Constantino d'Este (22 November 1724 – 16 June 1725) died in infancy.
3. Maria Teresa Felicitas d'Este (6 October 1726 – 30 April 1754) married Louis Jean Marie de Bourbon, Duke of Penthièvre and had issue.
4. Ercole III d'Este, Duke of Modena (22 November 1727 – 14 October 1803) married Maria Teresa Cybo-Malaspina, Duchess of Massa and had issue.
5. Matilde d'Este (7 February 1729 – 14 November 1803) died unmarried.
6. Beatrice d'Este (14 July 1730 – 12 July 1731) died in infancy.
7. Beatrice d'Este (24 November 1731 – 3 April 1736) died in infancy.
8. Maria Fortunata d'Este (24 November 1731 – 21 September 1803) married Louis François de Bourbon, Prince of Conti, no issue.
9. Benedetto Filippo d'Este (30 September 1736 – 16 September 1751) died unmarried.
10. Maria Elisabetta Ernestina d'Este (12 February 1741 – 4 August 1774) died unmarried.

== Ancestors ==
Ancestors of Charlotte Aglaé d'Orléans

8. Louis XIII of France
4. Philippe I, Duke of Orléans
9. Anne of Austria
2. Philippe II, Duke of Orléans
10. Charles I Louis, Elector Palatine
5. Elizabeth Charlotte of the Palatinate
11. Charlotte of Hesse-Kassel
1. Charlotte Aglaé d'Orléans
12. Louis XIII of France (= 8)
6. Louis XIV of France
13. Anne of Austria (= 9)
3. Françoise Marie de Bourbon
14. Gabriel de Rochechouart, 1st Duke of Mortemart
7. Madame de Montespan
15. Diane de Grandseigne

Charlotte Aglaé d'Orléans House of Orléans Cadet branch of the House of Bourbon Born: 20 October 1700 Died: 19 January 1761
Royal titles
Vacant Title last held by Charlotte Felicitas of Brunswick-Lüneburg	Duchess consort of Modena and Reggio; 26 October 1737 – 19 January 1761	Vacant Title next held by Maria Teresa Cybo-Malaspina, Duchess of Massa
