= Victor Leclerc de Buffon =

- Portrait believed to depict Victor Leclerc de Buffon
- Born: 6 September 1792
- Died: April 1812 (aged 19)
- Other names: Chevalier de Saint-Paul; Chevalier d'Orléans
- Occupation: Army officer
- Parents: Louis Philippe II, Duke of Orléans (father); Marguerite Françoise de Buffon (mother)
- Relatives: Louis Philippe I (half-brother)

Victor Leclerc de Buffon (6 September 1792 – April 1812), known as the chevalier de Saint-Paul or chevalier d'Orléans, was a French-born officer in the British Army and an illegitimate son of Louis Philippe II, Duke of Orléans. He died from wounds sustained at the siege of Badajoz during the Peninsular War.

== Early life ==
His mother, Marguerite Françoise de Buffon, was married to Georges Louis Marie Leclerc de Buffon, son of the naturalist Georges-Louis Leclerc, Comte de Buffon. Victor was presented as her husband's son, although his biological father was the Duke of Orléans.

According to the memoirs of the Comtesse de Boigne, his mother entrusted him to the sons of the Duke of Orléans, who brought him up abroad under the name Chevalier d'Orléans.

== Military service and death ==
Buffon served in the 7th Regiment of Foot (Royal Fusiliers). Military historian John R. Grodzinski identifies him as Paul St Pol and records his friendship with the Duke of Kent.

During the assault on Badajoz on 6 April 1812, he led the regiment's light company and was severely wounded.

According to Mick Crumplin, Buffon was struck in the thigh by a musket ball during the assault on Badajoz on 6 April 1812. The surgeon George James Guthrie examined him the following day and removed the ball from near his knee. Although no significant bone injury was initially apparent, the knee joint had been penetrated. Amputation was recommended, but he initially refused.

He was moved from his tent into Badajoz on 8 April. His leg subsequently developed gangrene, and an above-knee amputation was performed. Examination of the amputated limb revealed damage to the femoral artery. Crumplin attributes his death to blood loss, sepsis and exhaustion, dating it to 24 April 1812.

He had been gazetted captain several weeks before the assault but died without learning of his promotion.

== Personal connections ==
Leclerc de Buffon was a friend and protégé of Prince Edward, Duke of Kent and Strathearn. According to the regimental historian William Wheater, after learning of his death, the duke took consolation in the knowledge that his bravery had earned him the "esteem and attachment of those who were acquainted with him".
