= Georges Louis Marie Leclerc de Buffon =

French army officer (1764–1794)

- Engraving by Édouard Rosotte after a drawing by Piat Joseph Sauvage
- Born: 22 May 1764; Montbard, Kingdom of France
- Died: 10 July 1794 (aged 30)
- Cause of death: Execution by guillotine
- Occupation: Army officer
- Spouses: Marguerite Françoise Bouvier de la Mothe de Cépoy (m. 1784; div. 1793) Élisabeth-Georgette Daubenton (m. 1793)
- Parents: Georges-Louis Leclerc, Comte de Buffon (father); Marie-Françoise de Saint-Belin-Malain (mother)

Georges Louis Marie Leclerc de Buffon (22 May 1764 – 10 July 1794) was a French army officer and the son of the naturalist Georges-Louis Leclerc, Comte de Buffon. He served as mayor of Montbard and held commands in the National Guard and the army during the French Revolution. He was condemned by the Revolutionary Tribunal and guillotined during the Reign of Terror.

== Early life and travels ==
Buffon was born in Montbard on 22 May 1764. His education emphasised the sciences, as his father intended him to succeed to the administration of the Jardin du Roi. According to the memoirs of his father's secretary, Humbert-Bazile, French court intrigues prevented this appointment, and he instead pursued a military career.

As a young man, he travelled to Switzerland with his tutor and visited Voltaire at Ferney. Humbert-Bazile recounts that Voltaire invited him to sit in his own armchair and stood before him with his head uncovered as a mark of respect for his father. Buffon subsequently travelled through Germany and visited Vienna, where he was received by Holy Roman Emperor Joseph II.

He also travelled to Saint Petersburg to present Empress Catherine II with a bust of his father by Jean-Antoine Houdon. Accompanied by the chevalier de Contréglise, a fellow officer in the French Guards, he spent six months at the Russian court. On his return journey, he again visited Joseph II and was received by Frederick II of Prussia at Potsdam.

== Marriage and military career ==
On 5 January 1784, Buffon married Marguerite Françoise Bouvier de la Mothe de Cépoy. Shortly afterwards, he joined the Chartres Regiment as a captain and was posted to its garrison in Flanders. His wife became the mistress of Louis Philippe II, Duke of Orléans, who was associated with the regiment. The relationship contributed to the breakdown of their marriage.

In 1787, his father urged him to resign his commission in the regiment. On 22 July that year, he became a replacement captain in the Septimanie Dragoons, and on 4 April 1788 he was appointed second major in the Angoumois Regiment.

On 6 September 1792, his first wife gave birth to Victor Leclerc de Buffon. Although presented as Buffon's son and bearing his surname, Victor is generally identified as the biological son of her lover, Louis Philippe II, Duke of Orléans.

Buffon and his first wife divorced on 14 January 1793. On 2 September 1793, he married Élisabeth-Georgette, known as Betzy, Daubenton, a niece of the naturalist Louis Jean-Marie Daubenton.

== French Revolution ==
Buffon initially supported the Duke of Orléans, but subsequently broke with him. He supported the French Revolution and became mayor of Montbard and colonel of its National Guard. In 1790, he commanded a gathering at Dijon of more than 6,000 armed men from the departments formed from the former province of Burgundy. He was also chosen to command a National Guard legion in Paris by the rue Verte section.

He was appointed lieutenant-colonel of the 9th Chasseurs Regiment and became colonel of the 68th Infantry Regiment in 1791.

== Title ==
Following his father's death in 1788, Buffon succeeded him as the second Count of Buffon. During the Revolution, he expressed his willingness to relinquish his titles and coat of arms, but insisted on retaining the name Buffon because of its association with his father's achievements. Hereditary nobility and noble titles, including that of count, were abolished by decree of the National Constituent Assembly on 19 June 1790.

== Imprisonment and execution ==
Humbert-Bazile's memoirs describe an attempted extortion preceding Buffon's arrest: a man demanded 100 gold pieces from him and was expelled from his house. The following evening, armed men arrested Buffon and took him to the Madelonnettes prison. Members of his National Guard legion, supported by other sections, demanded his release, which the revolutionary committee granted.

He was subsequently arrested again and imprisoned at the Luxembourg prison. Accused of involvement in the alleged Luxembourg prison conspiracy, he was sentenced to death by the Revolutionary Tribunal. He was guillotined on 10 July 1794, aged 30.

== Widow and estate ==
Following Buffon's execution, his widow, Élisabeth-Georgette "Betzy" Daubenton, sought his rehabilitation and the recovery of his confiscated property. On 11 August 1795, after more than a year of petitions, she obtained a decision from the Committee of Legislation lifting the sequestration of his property and restoring possession to his heirs or beneficiaries.

Lengthy litigation and debts placed Betzy under financial pressure. She sold furniture between 1799 and 1801, mortgaged parts of the house and gardens from 1840, and sold several garden terraces in 1850. The gardens deteriorated through lack of maintenance.

Betzy died in May 1852, leaving the remaining property to members of the Nadault de Buffon family. Burdened by its mortgages and debts, her beneficiaries sold the house and gardens to Mathieu Desgrands, a merchant based in Messina, in 1853. The municipality of Montbard acquired the château and Parc Buffon in 1885.

Following the municipal acquisition in 1885, restoration of the château's walls and buildings began in 1888. In 1901, Montbard's archaeological society established a museum in the Tour Saint-Louis. The park received protected-site status in 1934, followed by further heritage protections in 1945 and 1947. The surviving medieval structures and gardens now form part of the Musée et Parc Buffon, a public heritage site devoted to Buffon, Daubenton and the history of natural science.
