= Louis Philippe II, Duke of Orléans =

French royal and father of Louis Philippe I, King of the French (1747–1793)

Louis Philippe II Philippe Égalité
- First Prince of the Blood; Duke of Orléans
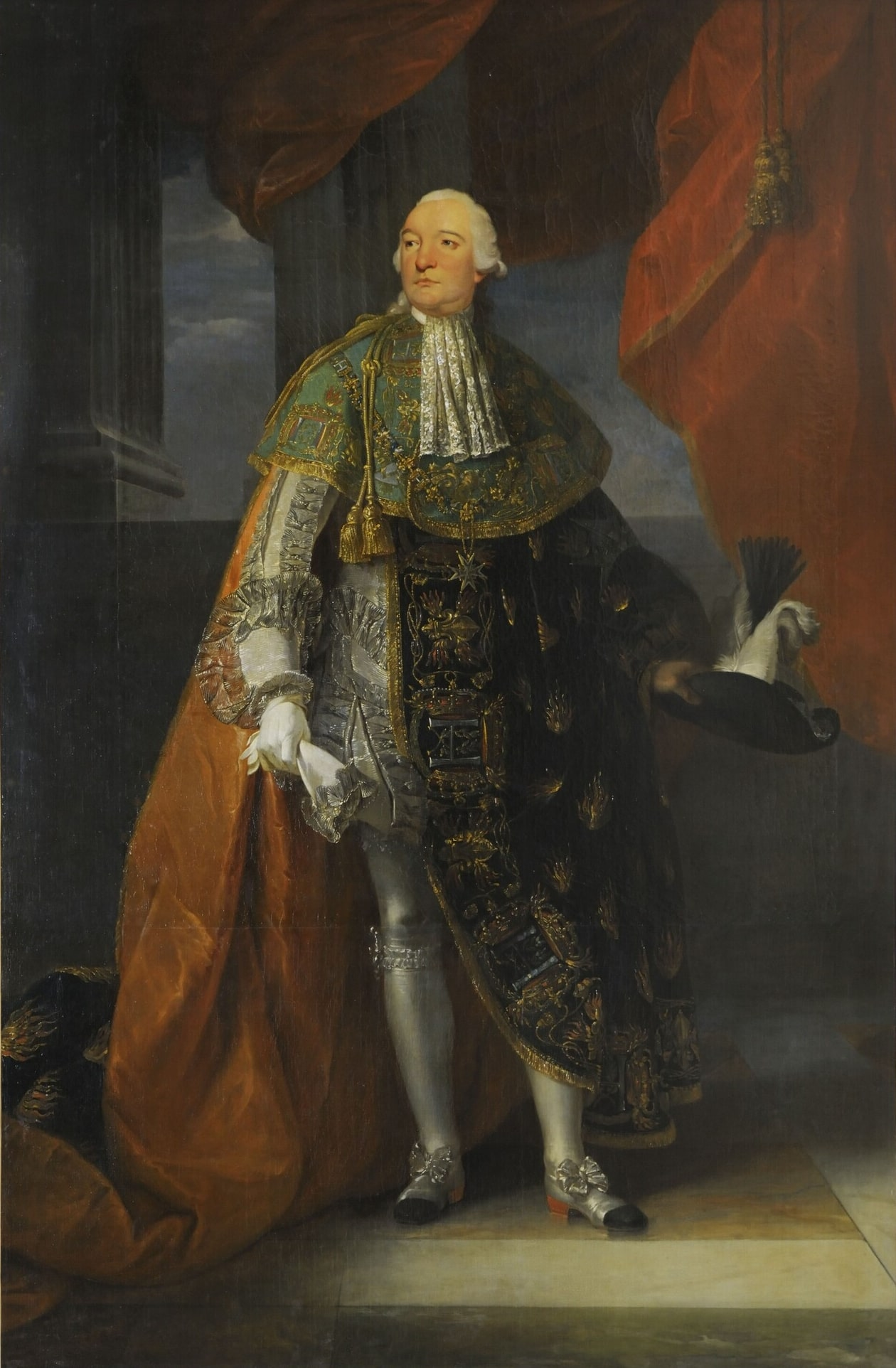
- Portrait by Antoine-François Callet
- Born: Louis Philippe Joseph d'Orléans; 13 April 1747; Château de Saint-Cloud, Saint-Cloud, Kingdom of France
- Died: 6 November 1793 (aged 46); Paris, French First Republic
- Spouse: Louise Marie Adélaïde de Bourbon (m. 1769)
- Issue: Louis Philippe I, King of the French; Antoine Philippe, Duke of Montpensier; Françoise d'Orléans; Adélaïde d'Orléans; Louis Charles, Count of Beaujolais
- House: Orléans
- Father: Louis Philippe I, Duke of Orléans
- Mother: Louise Henriette de Bourbon

Louis Philippe II, Duke of Orléans (Louis Philippe Joseph; 13 April 1747 – 6 November 1793), was a French Prince of the Blood who supported the French Revolution.

Louis Philippe II was born at the Château de Saint-Cloud to Louis Philippe I, Duke of Chartres, and his wife, Louise Henriette de Bourbon-Conti. He was titled Duke of Montpensier at birth. When his grandfather Louis, Duke of Orléans, died in 1752, his father became the new Duke of Orléans and Louis Philippe II became Duke of Chartres. When his father died in 1785, he became Duke of Orléans and First Prince of the Blood. He was styled as Serene Highness (French: Son Altesse Sérénissime).

In 1792, during the Revolution, Louis Philippe changed his name to Philippe Égalité. He was a cousin of King Louis XVI and one of the wealthiest men in France. He actively supported the Revolution of 1789, and was a strong advocate for the elimination of the present absolute monarchy in favor of a constitutional monarchy. Égalité voted for the death of Louis XVI; however, he was himself guillotined in 1793 during the Reign of Terror. His son, also named Louis Philippe, became King of the French after the July Revolution of 1830. After Louis Philippe II, the term Orléanist came to be attached to the movement in France that favored a constitutional monarchy.

== Early life ==
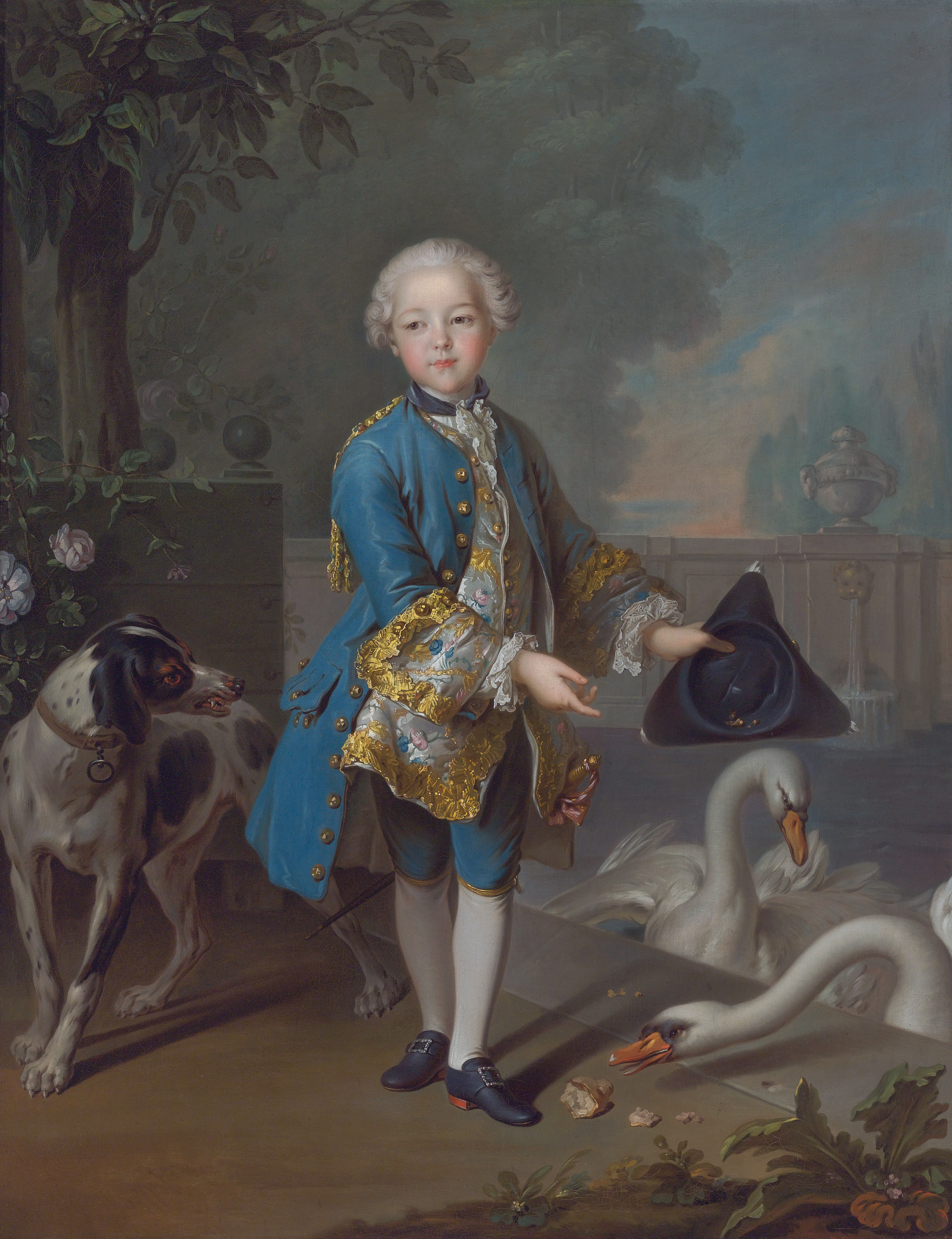
Portrait of a young Louis Philippe Joseph d'Orléans, by Louis Tocqué.

Louis Philippe Joseph d'Orléans was the son of Louis Philippe d'Orléans, Duke of Chartres, and his wife, Louise Henriette de Bourbon-Conti. Philippe was a member of the House of Orléans, a cadet branch of the House of Bourbon. His mother came from the House of Bourbon-Conti, a cadet branch of the House of Bourbon-Condé.

Philippe was born at the Château de Saint-Cloud, one of the residences of the Duke of Orléans, five kilometers west of Paris. His older sister, born in 1745, died when she was six months old. His younger sister, Bathilde d'Orléans, was born in 1750.

On March 12, 1756, Philippe and his sister were among the first people in France to be inoculated against smallpox, a decision made by their father against the advice of both their mother and King Louis XV. The procedure was performed by physician Théodore Tronchin, and a few days later, "the Duchess of Orelans, having appeared at the Opera with her two children, was greeted by endless applause and cheers, as if the two princes had miraculously escaped death."

=== Succession ===
Philippe's first title, given to him at birth, was that of the Duke of Montpensier. After his grandfather's death in 1752, Philippe inherited the title of Duke of Chartres. After his father's death in 1785, Philippe became the Duke of Orléans, head of the House of Orléans, one of the wealthiest noble families in France. At his father's death, Philippe became the Premier Prince du Sang, First Prince of the Blood, which put him in line for the succession to the throne immediately after the comte d'Artois, the youngest brother of Louis XVI.

== Personal life ==
=== Marriage ===
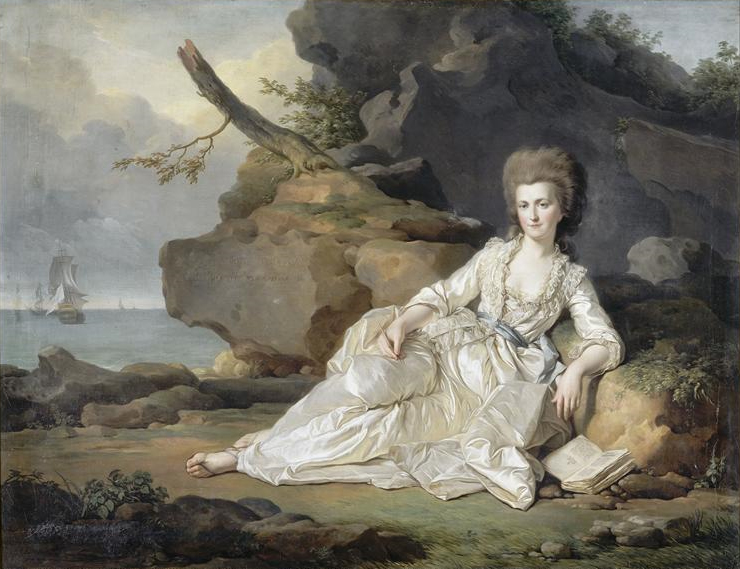
Louise Marie Adélaïde as the Duchess of Chartres

On 6 June 1769, Louis Philippe married Louise Marie Adélaïde de Bourbon at the chapel of the Palace of Versailles. She was the daughter of his cousin, Louis Jean Marie de Bourbon, Duke of Penthièvre, one of the richest men in France. Since it was certain that his wife would become the richest woman in France upon the death of her father, Louis Philippe was able to play a political role in court equal to that of his great-grandfather Philippe II, Duke of Orléans, who had been the Regent of France during the minority of Louis XV. Louise Marie Adélaïde brought to the already wealthy House of Orléans a considerable dowry of six million livres, an annual income of 240,000 livres (later increased to 400,000 livres), as well as lands, titles, residences and furniture. Unlike her husband, the Duchess of Orléans did not support the Revolution. She was a devout Catholic who supported keeping the monarchy in France, as well as following the orders of Pope Pius VI. This was the causes of one of the rifts of the couple, as their first son, the future "King of the French", followed his father's footsteps and joined the Jacobin faction.

=== Scandals ===
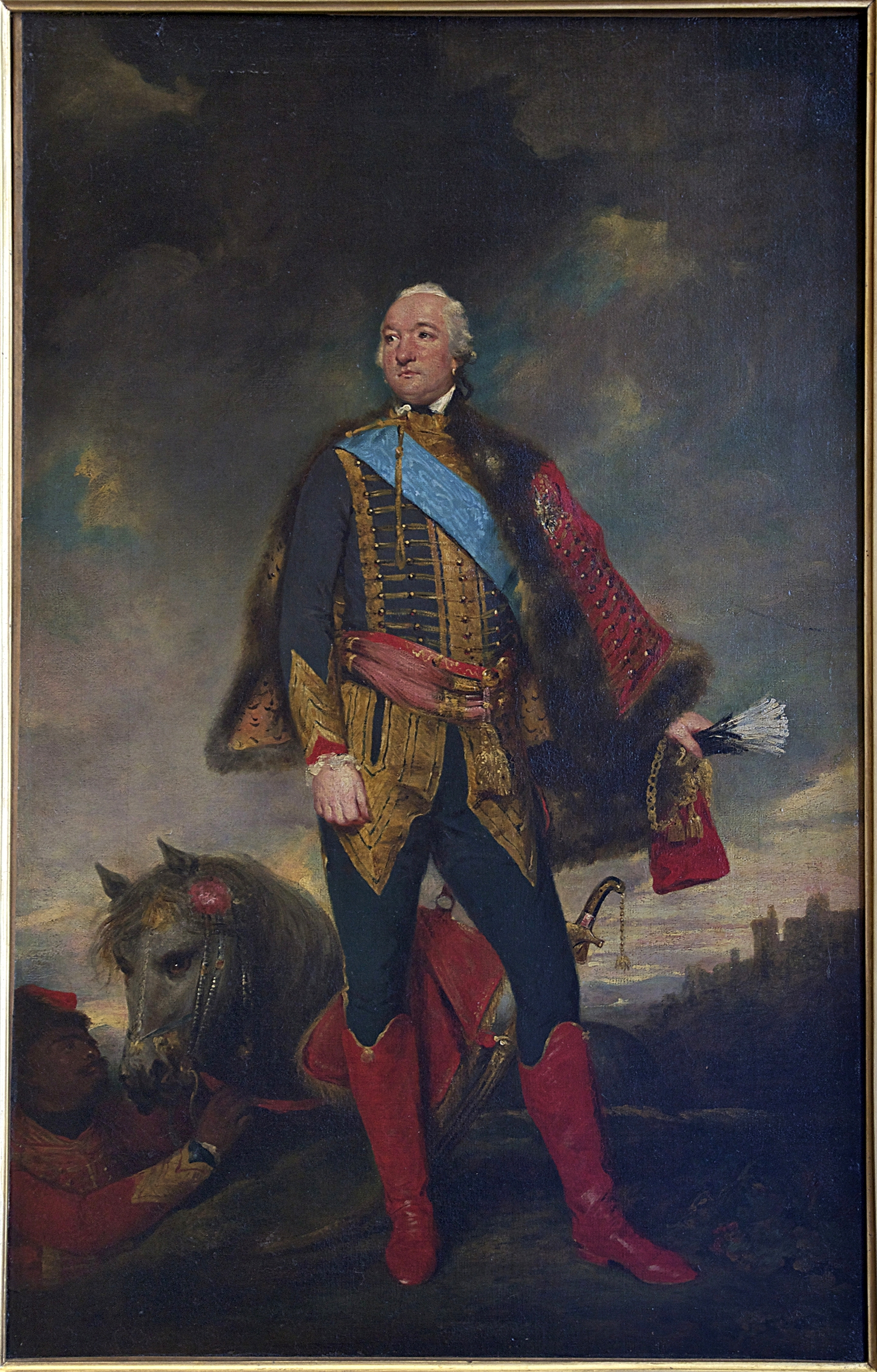
Louis Philippe d'Orléans, as Duke of Chartres, by Sir Joshua Reynolds, c. 1779, Château de Chantilly

During the first few months of their marriage, the couple appeared devoted to each other, but the Duke went back to the life of libertinage he had led before his marriage. The Duke was a well-known womanizer and, like several of his ancestors, such as Louis XIV and Philippe II, Duke of Orléans, had several illegitimate children.

During the summer of 1772, the Duke began his secret liaison with one of his wife's ladies-in-waiting, Stéphanie Félicité, comtesse de Genlis, the niece of Madame de Montesson, the morganatic wife of Philippe's father. Passionate at first, the liaison cooled within a few months and, by the spring of 1773, was reported to be "dead". After the romantic affair was over, Madame de Genlis remained in the service of Marie-Adélaïde at the Palais-Royal, a trusted friend to both the Duke and the Duchess. They both appreciated her intelligence and, in July 1779, she became the governess of the couple's twin daughters (born in 1777). One of his best known lovers was Grace Elliott.

It was alleged that Lady Edward FitzGerald, born Stephanie Caroline Anne Syms, also known as Pamela, was a natural daughter of the Duke and the Countess of Genlis. He recognized a son he had with Marguerite Françoise Bouvier de la Mothe de Cépoy, comtesse de Buffon, Victor Leclerc de Buffon (6 September 1792 – 20 April 1812), known as the chevalier de Saint-Paul and chevalier d'Orléans.

== Military career ==
In 18th-century France, it was very common for royal princes to receive high positions in the military. From a young age, Philippe d'Orléans displayed his interest in naval matters, and he received three years of training in the French Navy. By 1776, he held the rank of chef d'escadre, and commanded one of the three divisions of the escadre d'évolution, with his flag on the 64-gun Solitaire.

When war between Britain and France broke out in 1778, Orléans commanded a squadron at the rank of lieutenant général des armées navales. His squadron that formed the rear of a French fleet under Louis Guillouet, comte d'Orvilliers, with his flag on the 80-gun Saint-Esprit. On 27 July 1778, d'Orvilliers's fleet fought the inconclusive Battle of Ushant against a British fleet under Admiral Augustus Keppel. During the battle, the French fought in inverted order, placing Orléans' squadron at the vanguard of their line of battle. Orléans' squadron failed to exploit a gap in the British line, allowing the rear of Keppel's fleet to withdraw from the battle intact and rejoin the rest of the British ships.

Following his return to Paris, Orléans claimed the battle had been a resounding French victory and was rewarded with a hero's welcome. When it became known in France that the battle had actually been inconclusive, Orléans' credibility suffered an unrecoverable blow. He resigned from the Navy and asked the French Royal Army if they could give him a position, which was denied.

== Role in the French Revolution ==
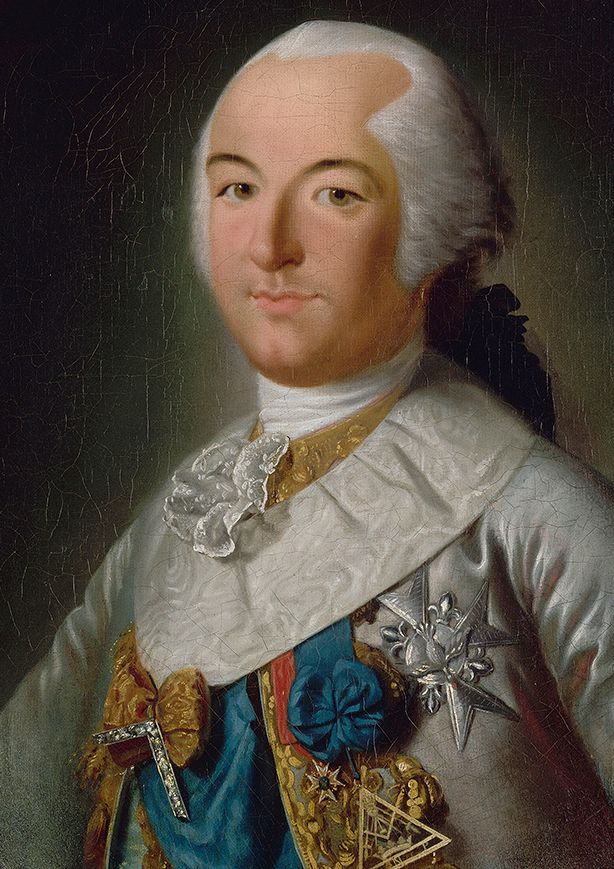
Louis Philippe d'Orléans with the insignia of the grand master of the Grand Orient de France, the governing body of French freemasonry.

=== Liberal ideology ===
In August 1787 the Duke of Orléans and his secretary Charles-Louis Ducrest, the brother of Madame de Genlis, came up with proposals to improve the financial situation of France. Philippe d'Orléans became a member of the Society of the Friends of the Constitution, and strongly adhered to the principles of Denis Diderot, Voltaire and Jean-Jacques Rousseau. He was interested in creating a more moral and democratic form of government in France. As he grew more and more interested in Rousseau's ideas, he began to promote Enlightenment ideas, such as the separation of church and state and limited monarchy. He also advocated and voted against feudalism and slavery.

In addition to being a Jacobin, Philippe was also the Grand Master of the Masonic Grand Orient de France, the most powerful Masonic Obedience in worldwide Continental Freemasonry (which now stands opposed to the "Regular" Freemasonry of the United Grand Lodge of England and the majority of lodges in the United States of America), from 1771 to 1793, even though he did not attend a meeting until 1777. He later distanced himself from Freemasonry in a letter dated January 1793, and the Grand Orient vacated his position on 13 December 1793 (however, Philippe had already been executed weeks before).

Philippe was also a strong admirer of Britain's Westminster system and constitutional monarchy. He strongly advocated for France's adoption of a constitutional monarchy rather than the absolute monarchy that was present in France at the time.

=== Palais-Royal ===
As the new Duke of Orléans, one of the many estates Philippe inherited from his father was the Palais-Royal, which became known as the Palais-Égalité in 1792, because he opened up its doors to all people of France, regardless of their estate (class). He employed Swiss guards to refuse entry only to "drunkards, women in excessively indecent dress, and those in tatters." He built shops and cafés where people could interact, and soon it became a hub for social life in Paris. As the Parisian police had no authority to enter the Duke's private property, it became a hub for illegal activity, such as trade in stolen goods, suspicious deals, and the spread of revolutionary ideas. In fact, it was a common place for Jacobins to meet and discuss their plans and ideas. Many members of the National Assembly claimed that the Palais-Royal was the "birthplace of the Revolution." Philippe's goal was to create a place where people could meet, which he argued was a crucial part of democracy and a "physical need for civil life."

During the months leading up to the outbreak of revolutionary violence in July 1789, Philippe d'Orléans undertook several personal actions having the effect of increasing his personal standing among the population at large. These included his endorsement of a pamphlet outlining the process to be followed in the setting up of local assemblies, the sale of artwork to provide funds for poor relief and an incident during the Réveillon riots where he scattered coins among a cheering crowd.

=== Leadership in the Estates-General ===
Philippe d'Orléans was elected to the Estates General of 1789 by three districts: by the nobility of Paris, Villers-Cotterêts, and Crépy-en-Valois. As a noble in the Second Estate, he was the head of the liberal minority under the guidance of Adrien Duport. Although he was a member of the Second Estate, he felt a strong connection to the Third Estate, as they comprised the majority of the members in the Estates-General, yet were the most underrepresented. When the Third Estate decided to take the Tennis Court Oath and break away from the Estates General to form the National Assembly, Philippe was one of the first to join them and was a very important figure in the unification of the nobility and the Third Estate. In fact, he led his minority group of 47 nobles to secede from their estate and join the National Assembly.

=== Women's March on Versailles and exile ===
One of the main accusations thrown at Philippe d'Orléans was the initiation of the Women's March on Versailles on 5 October 1789, which people believed was done in order to overthrow the King and gain popularity among the people. He was accused of funding the riots, as well as calling the rioters his "friends", who were chanting: "Vive Orléans" or "Long live our father, long live King d'Orléans!" The High Court of the Grand Châtelet also accused him of acting as an accomplice to Honoré Gabriel Riqueti, comte de Mirabeau, in an attempt to murder Louis XVI and his wife, Marie Antoinette, during this period. Early in the morning on 6 October a group of protesters entered the palace through an unguarded gate, searching for the queen's bedchamber, they were quickly followed by many and fighting with royal guards flared in the halls and outside the queen's apartments. Marie Antoinette and her ladies barely escaped to the king's bedchamber in front of the violent intruders; the queen was suspicious that d'Orléans had arranged the attempted attack on her. Marie Antoinette's daughter Marie-Thérèse shared the same suspicion later writing that, "[t]he principal project was to assassinate my mother".

The Marquis de Lafayette, who was very influential in France at the time and a supposed "friend" of d'Orléans, suggested to him to go to Britain with the promise that he could potentially become the head of state of Brabant. However, it is likely that Lafayette viewed d'Orléans as a threat to his control of the revolutionary politics and that he intended to get Philippe out of the country.

At first, it was difficult to convince d'Orléans to leave France during these troubling times, but after strong pressure and enticement from Lafayette, he ended up leaving. Throughout his weeks in exile, he wrote several letters expressing his strong desire to return to France. After spending several months in Britain, d'Orléans returned to France for the Fête de la Fédération; but he never regained the same influence that he enjoyed in 1789 prior to his departure. Those who did not support him, as well as people overseas, labeled him as a coward for fleeing to England as a result of accusations against him, calling it a period of "exile." However, he was able to keep his position in the National Assembly until it disbanded on 30 September 1791.

=== Citoyen Égalité ===
Due to the liberal ideology that separated Philippe d'Orléans from the rest of his royal family, he always felt uncomfortable with his name. He felt that the political connotations associated with his name did not match his democratic and Enlightenment philosophies, thus he requested that the Paris Commune allow his name to be changed, which was granted. Shortly after the September Massacres in 1792, he changed his surname to Égalité, ("equality" in English). As one of the three words in the motto of the French Revolution (Liberté, Égalité, Fraternité), he felt that this name better represented him as a symbol of the French people and what they were fighting for.

Égalité also attributed his new surname to the reputation of generosity that he had among the people of France, especially the poor. He was well known for distributing food and money to the poor, as well as providing shelter for homeless during the severe winter of 1788–1789.

=== Relationship with King Louis XVI ===
Although a relative of King Louis XVI, Philippe d'Orléans never maintained a positive relationship with his cousin. Upon inheriting the title of Duke of Orléans, Philippe also became the Premier Prince du sang – the most important personage of the kingdom after the king's immediate family. Therefore, he would be next in line to the throne should the main Bourbon line die out. For this reason, many supposed that Philippe's goal was to take his cousin's throne. Philippe and the King's wife, Marie Antoinette, also detested each other. Marie Antoinette hated him for what she viewed as treachery, hypocrisy and selfishness, and he, in turn, scorned her for her frivolous and spendthrift lifestyle. The King's reluctance to grant Philippe a position in the army after the indecisive result at the Battle of Ushant is said to be another reason for Philippe's discontent with the King.

At a meeting of parlement on 19 November 1787, Louis XVI, as if at a lit de justice, ordered the registration of some loans which were being championed by the Archbishop Brienne. Philippe suddenly rose and protested that the king's action was illegal. Taken aback, the king awkwardly replied that it was legal because he wished it. The next day Philippe was exiled to the countryside by means of a royal lettre de cachet.

One of the most astounding events occurred when Philippe took a vote in favor of Louis XVI's immediate execution. He had agreed among allies in the National Convention that he would vote against his execution, but surrounded by the Montagnards, a radical faction, he turned on this agreement, to the surprise of many. 288 of the 721 deputies voted against death and for some other alternative, mainly some means of imprisonment or exile, with 72 of the deputies voting for the death penalty, but subject to several delaying conditions and reservations. The voting took a total of 36 hours. 361 of the deputies voted for Louis's immediate execution. Louis was condemned to death by a majority of one vote. The King was especially shocked by the news, stating: "It really pains me to see that Monsieur d'Orléans, my kinsman, voted for my death."

== Death ==
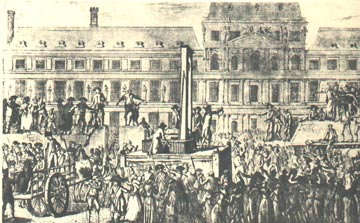
Image of death by guillotine.

On 1 April 1793, the National Convention passed a decree (with Égalité's vote) that condemned anyone with "strong presumptions of complicity with the enemies of Liberty." At the time, Égalité's son, Louis Philippe, who was a general in the French Revolutionary Army, joined General Charles François Dumouriez in a plot to visit the Austrians, who were an enemy of France. Although there was no evidence that convicted Égalité himself of treason, the simple relationship that his son had with Dumouriez, a traitor in the eyes of the Convention, was enough to get him and Louis Charles, Count of Beaujolais arrested on 4 April 1793, and the other members of the Bourbon family still in France on the days after. He spent several months incarcerated at Fort Saint-Jean in Marseille until he was sent back to Paris. On 2 November 1793, he was imprisoned at the Conciergerie. Tried by the Revolutionary Tribunal on 6 November, he was sentenced to death, and guillotined the same day. He was buried in the Errancis Cemetery, a common place of interment for those executed during the Revolution.

== Issue ==
The Duke and Duchess of Orléans had six legally-recognized children:

- A daughter (died at birth, 10 October 1771);
- Louis Philippe I, King of the French (6 October 1773 – 26 August 1850), King of the French (1830–1848);
- Louis Antoine Philippe d'Orléans (3 July 1775 – 18 May 1807), died in exile in Salt Hill, Buckinghamshire (now in Slough, Berkshire), England;
- Françoise d'Orléans, mademoiselle d'Orléans (twin sister of Adélaïde) (1777–1782);
- Louise Marie Adélaïde Eugénie d'Orléans; (23 August 1777 – 31 December 1847);
- Louis Charles d'Orléans (17 October 1779 – 30 May 1808), died in exile in Malta.

== Ancestry ==
Ancestors of Louis Philippe II, Duke of Orléans

8. Philippe II, Duke of Orléans
4. Louis, Duke of Orléans
9. Françoise Marie de Bourbon
2. Louis Philippe I, Duke of Orléans
10. Louis William, Margrave of Baden-Baden
5. Auguste of Baden-Baden
11. Sibylle of Saxe-Lauenburg
1. Louis Philippe II, Duke of Orléans
12. François Louis, Prince of Conti
6. Louis Armand II, Prince of Conti
13. Marie Thérèse de Bourbon
3. Louise Henriette de Bourbon
14. Louis III, Prince of Condé
7. Louise Élisabeth de Bourbon
15. Louise Françoise de Bourbon

== Sources and references ==
Citations

References

- de Montjoie, Galart, Conjuration de Louis-Philippe-Joseph d'Orléans, surnommé Égalité, Paris, 1796. 3 vols. (vol.1, vol.2, vol.3)
- Chack, Paul (2001). Marins à bataille (in French). Vol. 1. Paris: Le Gerfaut. ISBN 9782901196921. OCLC 552986998.
- Lacour-Gayet, Georges (1905). La marinole militaire de la France sous le règne de Louis XVI. Paris: Honoré Champion. OCLC 763372623.
- Troude, Onésime-Joachim (1867). Batailles navales de la France (in French). Vol. 2. Challamel ainé. OCLC 836362484.
