= Georges-Louis Leclerc, Comte de Buffon =

French naturalist, mathematician, and cosmologist (1701–1788)

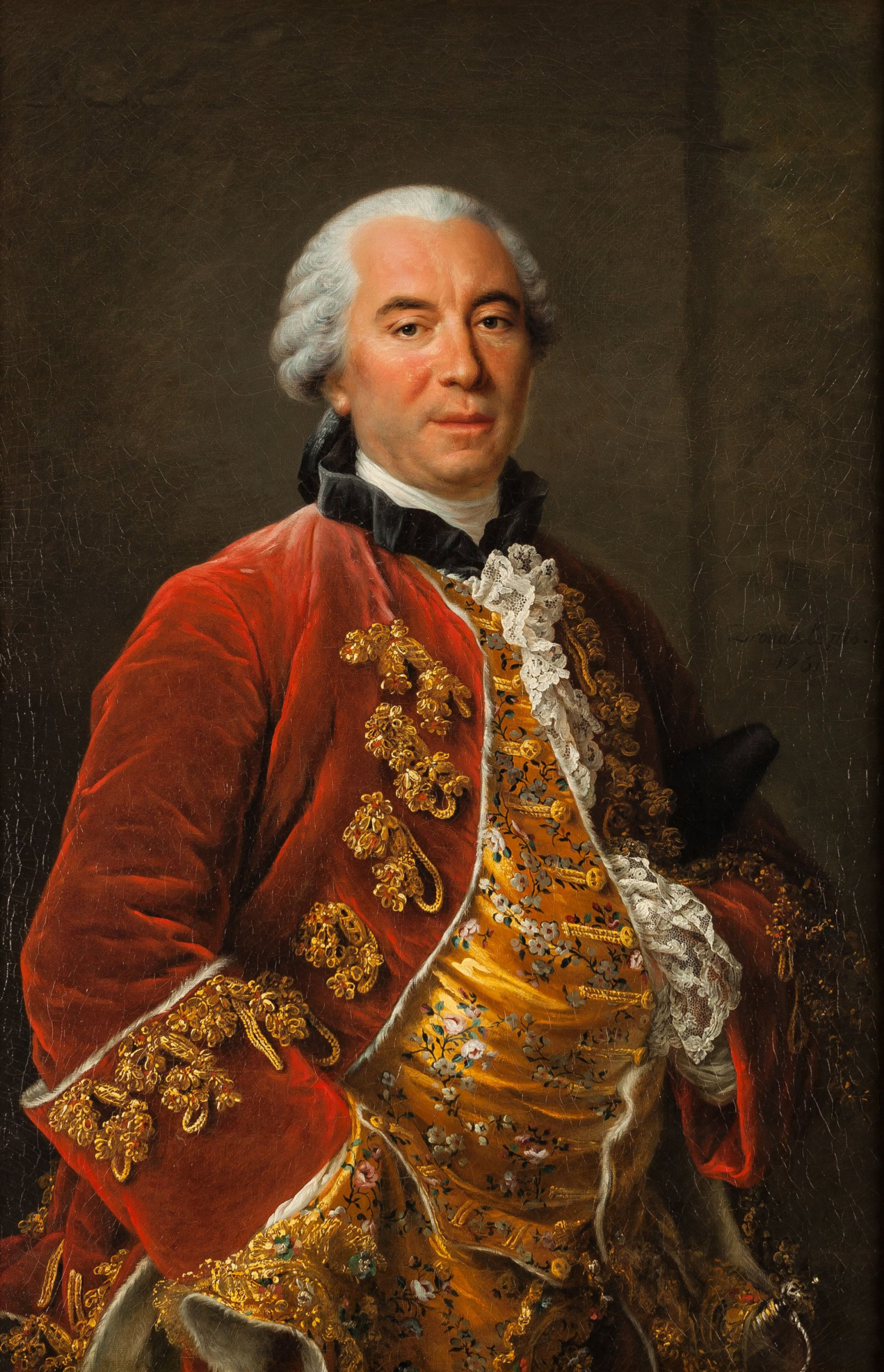
- Portrait by François-Hubert Drouais, 1753
- Born: Georges-Louis Leclerc; 7 September 1707; Montbard, Burgundy, France
- Died: 16 April 1788 (aged 80); Paris, France
- Education: University of Dijon; University of Angers
- Known for: Histoire Naturelle (1749–1804); Buffon's needle problem Rejection sampling
- Scientific career
- Fields: Natural history
- Workplaces: Académie Française

Georges-Louis Leclerc, Comte de Buffon (French: [ʒɔʁʒ lwi ləklɛʁ kɔ̃t də byfɔ̃]; 7 September 1707 – 16 April 1788) was a French naturalist, mathematician, and cosmologist. He held the position of intendant (director) at the Jardin du Roi.

Buffon's works influenced the next two generations of naturalists, including two prominent French scientists Jean-Baptiste Lamarck and Georges Cuvier. Buffon published thirty-six quarto volumes of his Histoire Naturelle during his lifetime, with additional volumes based on his notes and further research being published in the two decades following his death.

Ernst Mayr wrote that "Truly, Buffon was the father of all thought in natural history in the second half of the 18th century". Credited with being one of the first naturalists to recognize ecological succession, he was forced by the theology committee at the University of Paris to recant his theories about geological history and animal evolution because they contradicted the biblical narrative of creation.

== Early life ==
Georges Louis Leclerc was born at Montbard, in the province of Burgundy to Benjamin François Leclerc, a minor local official in charge of the gabelle salt tax and Anne-Christine Marlin, also from a family of civil servants. Georges was named after his mother's uncle (and godfather) Georges Blaisot, the tax-farmer for the Duke of Savoy for all of Sicily. In 1714 Blaisot died childless, leaving a considerable fortune to his seven-year-old godson. Benjamin Leclerc then purchased an estate containing the nearby village of Buffon and moved the family to Dijon acquiring various offices there as well as a seat in the Dijon Parlement.

Georges attended the Jesuit College of Godrans in Dijon from the age of ten onwards. From 1723 to 1726 he then studied law at the University of Dijon, the prerequisite for continuing the family tradition in civil service. In 1728 Georges left Dijon to study mathematics and medicine at the University of Angers in France. At Angers in 1730 he made the acquaintance of Evelyn Pierrepont, the young English Duke of Kingston, who was on his grand tour of Europe, and traveled with him on a large and expensive entourage for a year and a half through southern France and parts of Italy.

There are persistent undocumented rumors from this period about duels, abductions and secret trips to England. In 1732 after the death of his mother and before the impending remarriage of his father, Georges left Kingston and returned to Dijon to secure his inheritance. Having added 'de Buffon' to his name while traveling with the Duke, he repurchased the village of Buffon, which his father had meanwhile sold off. With a fortune of about 80,000 livres (at the time, worth nearly 27 kilograms of gold), Buffon set himself up in Paris to pursue science, at first primarily mathematics and mechanics, and the increase of his fortune. On his personal estate in Montbard, he had a garden pavilion and shell grotto built to store his porcelain collection.

== Career ==
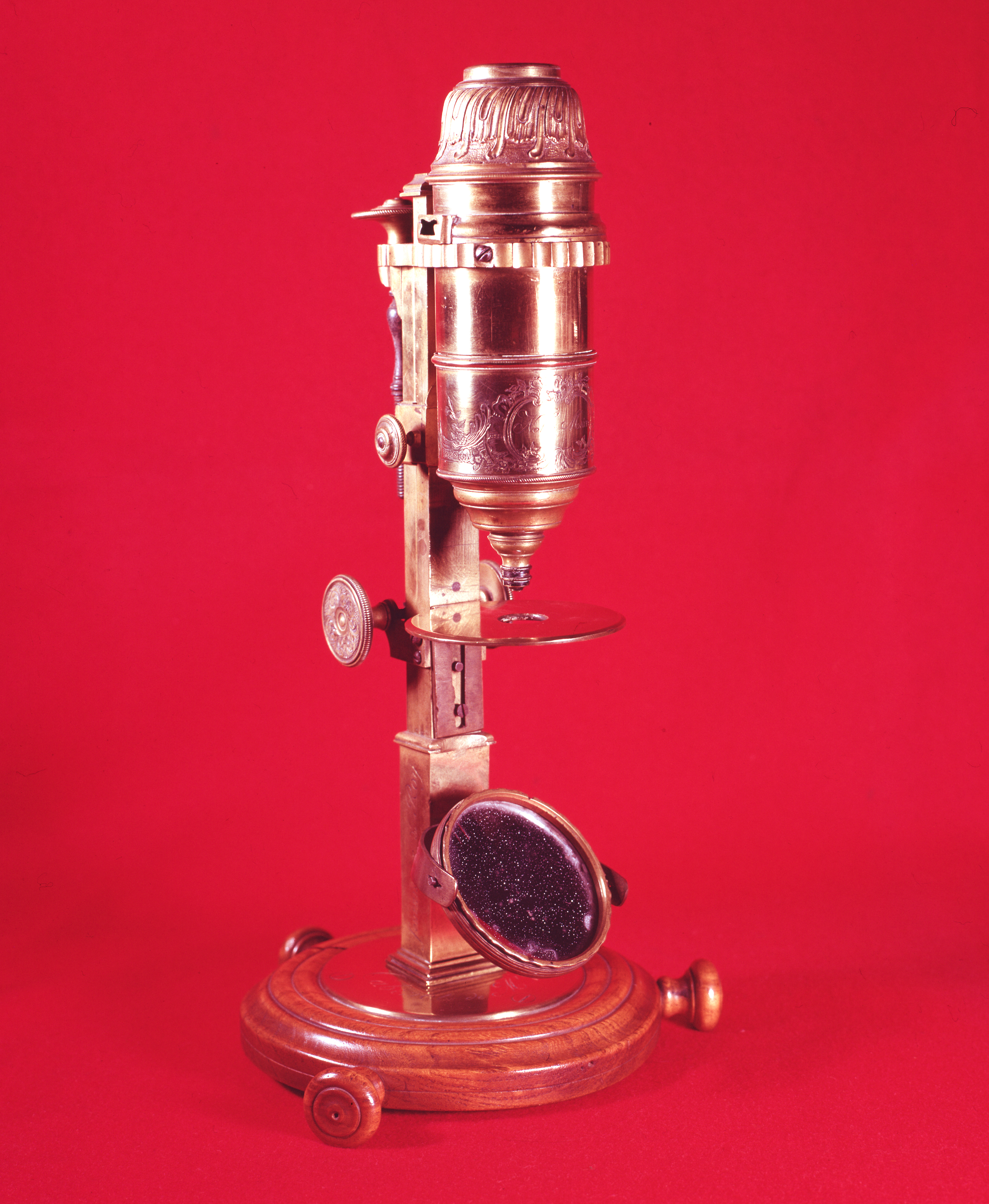
Buffon's microscope

In 1732 he moved to Paris, where he met Voltaire and other intellectuals. He lived in the Faubourg Saint-Germain, with Gilles-François Boulduc, first apothecary of the King, professor of chemistry at the Jardin du Roi, member of the Academy of Sciences. He first made his mark in the field of mathematics and, in his Sur le jeu de franc-carreau (On the game of fair-square), introduced differential and integral calculus into probability theory; the problem of Buffon's needle in probability theory is named after him. In 1734 he was admitted to the French Academy of Sciences. During this period he corresponded with the Swiss mathematician Gabriel Cramer.

His protector Maurepas had asked the Academy of Sciences to do research on wood for the construction of ships in 1733. Soon afterward, Buffon began a long-term study, performing some of the most comprehensive tests to date on the mechanical properties of wood. Included were a series of tests to compare the properties of small specimens with those of large members. After carefully testing more than a thousand small specimens without knots or other defects, Buffon concluded that it was not possible to extrapolate to the properties of full-size timbers, and he began a series of tests on full-size structural members.

In 1739 he was appointed head of the Parisian Jardin du Roi with the help of Maurepas; he held this position to the end of his life. Buffon was instrumental in transforming the Jardin du Roi into a major research center and museum. He also enlarged it, arranging the purchase of adjoining plots of land and acquiring new botanical and zoological specimens from all over the world.

Thanks to his talent as a writer, he was invited to join the Académie Française in 1753 and then in 1768 he was elected to the American Philosophical Society. In his Discours sur le style ("Discourse on Style"), pronounced before the Académie française, he said, "Writing well consists of thinking, feeling and expressing well, of clarity of mind, soul and taste ... The style is the man himself" ("Le style c'est l'homme même"). Unfortunately for him, Buffon's reputation as a literary stylist also gave ammunition to his detractors: the mathematician Jean le Rond d'Alembert, for example, called him "the great phrase-monger".

In 1752 Buffon married Marie-Françoise de Saint-Belin-Malain, the daughter of an impoverished noble family from Burgundy, who had been enrolled in the convent school run by his sister. Madame de Buffon's second child, a son born in 1764, survived childhood; she herself died in 1769. When in 1772 Buffon became seriously ill and the promise that his son (then only 8) should succeed him as director of the Jardin became clearly impracticable and was withdrawn, the King raised Buffon's estates in Burgundy to the status of a county – and thus Buffon (and his son) became a count. He was elected a Foreign Honorary Member of the American Academy of Arts and Sciences in 1782. Buffon died in Paris in 1788.

He was buried in a chapel adjacent to the church of Sainte-Urse Montbard; during the French Revolution, his tomb was broken into and the lead that covered the coffin was ransacked to produce bullets. His son, George-Louie-Marie Buffon (often called Buffonet) was guillotined on 10 July 1794. Buffon's heart was initially saved, as it was guarded by Suzanne Necker (wife of Jacques Necker), but was later lost. Today, only Buffon's cerebellum remains, as it is kept in the base of the statue by Augustin Pajou that Louis XVI had commissioned in his honor in 1776, located at the Museum of Natural History in Paris.

His Histoire naturelle was a source of inspiration for the painters of the Sèvres factory, giving rise to porcelain services called Buffon. The name of the different species is inscribed on the back of each piece. Several "Buffon services" were produced during the reign of Louis XVI; the first was intended for the Count of Artois, in 1782.

== Histoire Naturelle ==
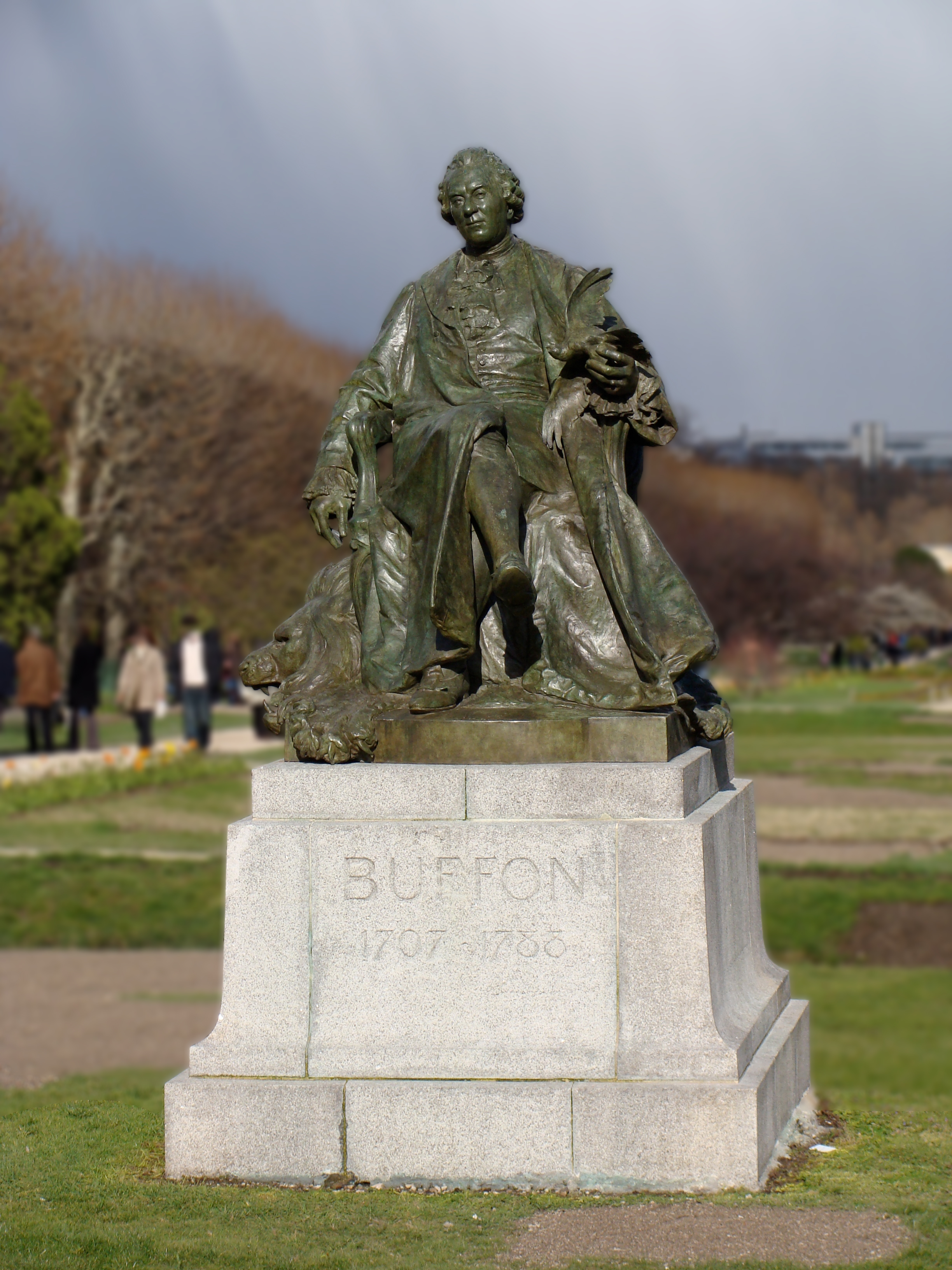
Statue of Buffon in the Jardin des plantes

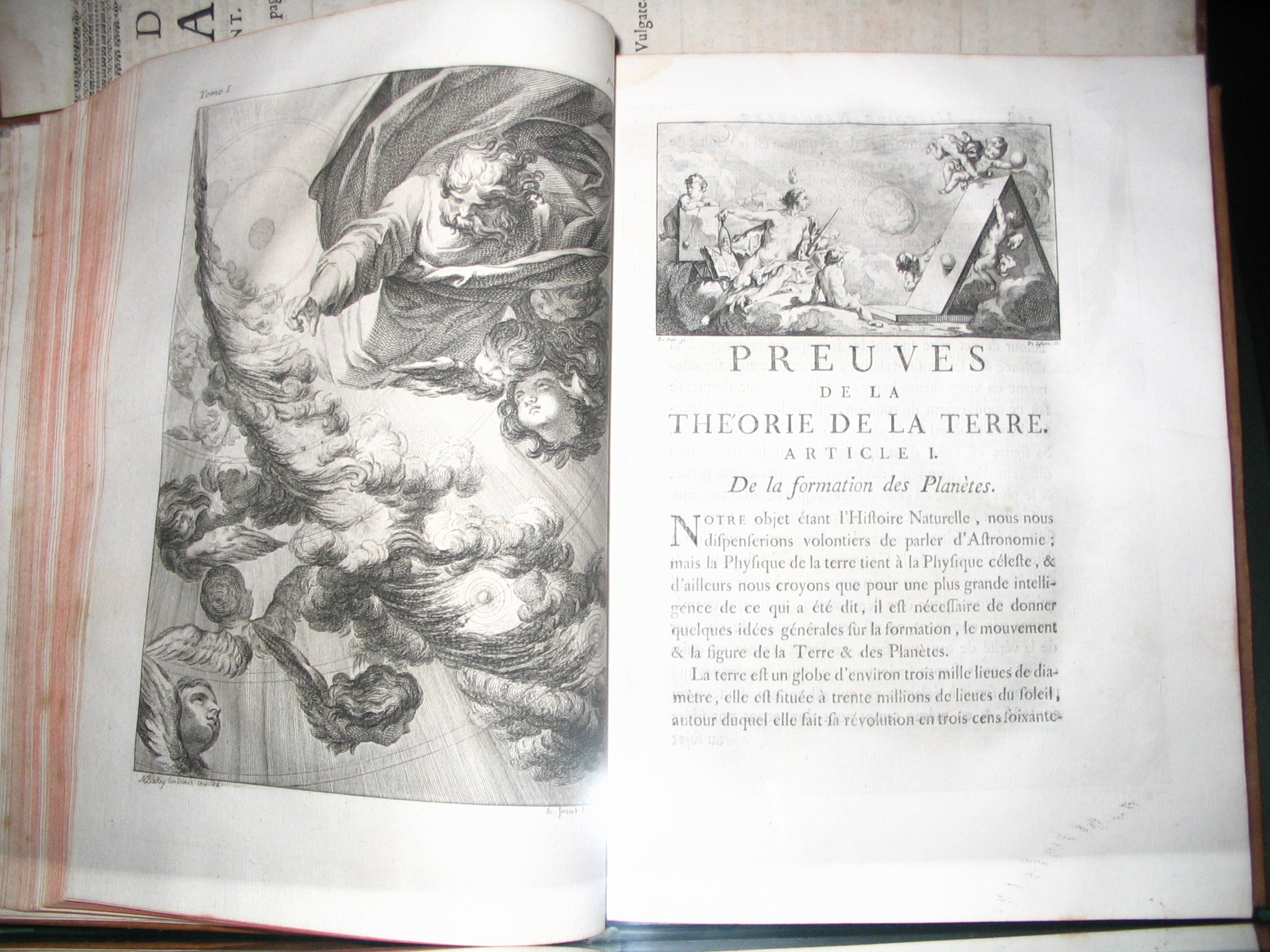
"Preuves de la théorie de la Terre", in the Buffon Museum, Montbard, Côte-d'Or, France

Buffon's Histoire naturelle, générale et particulière (1749–1788: in 36 volumes; an additional volume based on his notes appeared in 1789) was originally intended to cover all three "kingdoms" of nature but the Histoire naturelle ended up being limited to the animal and mineral kingdoms, and the animals covered were only the birds and quadrupeds. "Written in a brilliant style, this work was read ... by every educated person in Europe". Those who assisted him in the production of this great work included Louis Jean-Marie Daubenton, Philibert Guéneau de Montbeillard, and Gabriel-Léopold Bexon, along with numerous artists. Buffon's Histoire naturelle was translated into many different languages, making him one of the most widely read authors of the day, a rival to Montesquieu, Rousseau, and Voltaire.

In the opening volumes of the Histoire naturelle Buffon questioned the usefulness of mathematics, criticized Carl Linnaeus's taxonomical approach to natural history, outlined a history of the Earth with little relation to the Biblical account, and proposed a theory of reproduction that ran counter to the prevailing theory of pre-existence. The early volumes were condemned by the Faculty of Theology at the Sorbonne. Buffon published a retraction, but he continued publishing the offending volumes without any change.

In the course of his examination of the animal world, Buffon noted that different regions have distinct plants and animals despite similar environments, a concept later known as Buffon's Law. This is considered to be the first principle of biogeography. He made the suggestion that species may have both "improved" and "degenerated" after dispersing from a center of creation. In volume 14 he argued that all the world's quadrupeds had developed from an original set of just thirty-eight quadrupeds. On this basis, he is sometimes considered a "transformist" and a precursor of Darwin. He also asserted that climate change may have facilitated the worldwide spread of species from their centers of origin. Still, interpreting his ideas on the subject is not simple, for he returned to topics many times in the course of his work.

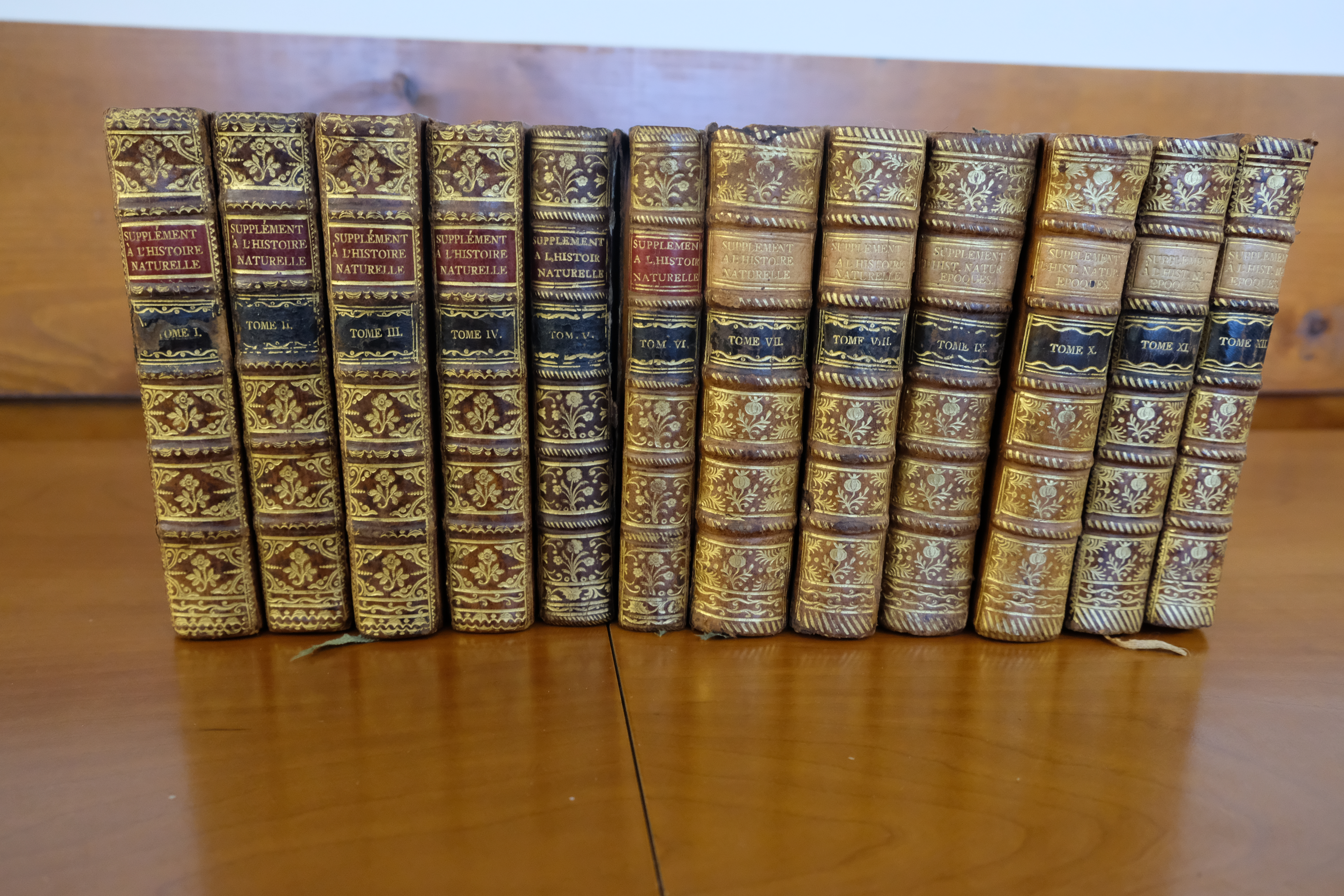
Volumes 1–12 of a 1774 edition of Supplement to Histoire Naturelle, Générale et Particulière

Buffon originally held that "the animals common both to the old and new world are smaller in the latter," ascribing this to environmental conditions. Upon meeting Buffon, Thomas Jefferson attempted "to convince him of his error," noting that "the reindeer could walk under the belly of our moose." Buffon, who was "absolutely unacquainted" with the moose, asked for a specimen. Jefferson dispatched twenty soldiers to the New Hampshire woods to find a bull moose for Buffon as proof of the "stature and majesty of American quadrupeds". According to Jefferson, the specimen "convinced Mr. Buffon. He promised in his next volume to set these things right."

In Les époques de la nature (1778) Buffon discussed the origins of the Solar System, speculating that the planets had been created by a comet's collision with the Sun. He also suggested that the Earth originated much earlier than 4004 BC, the date determined by Archbishop James Ussher. Basing his figures on the cooling rate of iron tested at his Laboratory the Petit Fontenet at Montbard, he calculated that the Earth was at least 75,000 years old. Once again, his ideas were condemned by the Sorbonne, and once again he issued a retraction to avoid further problems.

Buffon knew of the existence of extinct species as mammoths or European rhinos. Some of his assumptions have inspired modern theories, such as continental drift.

=== Publications ===
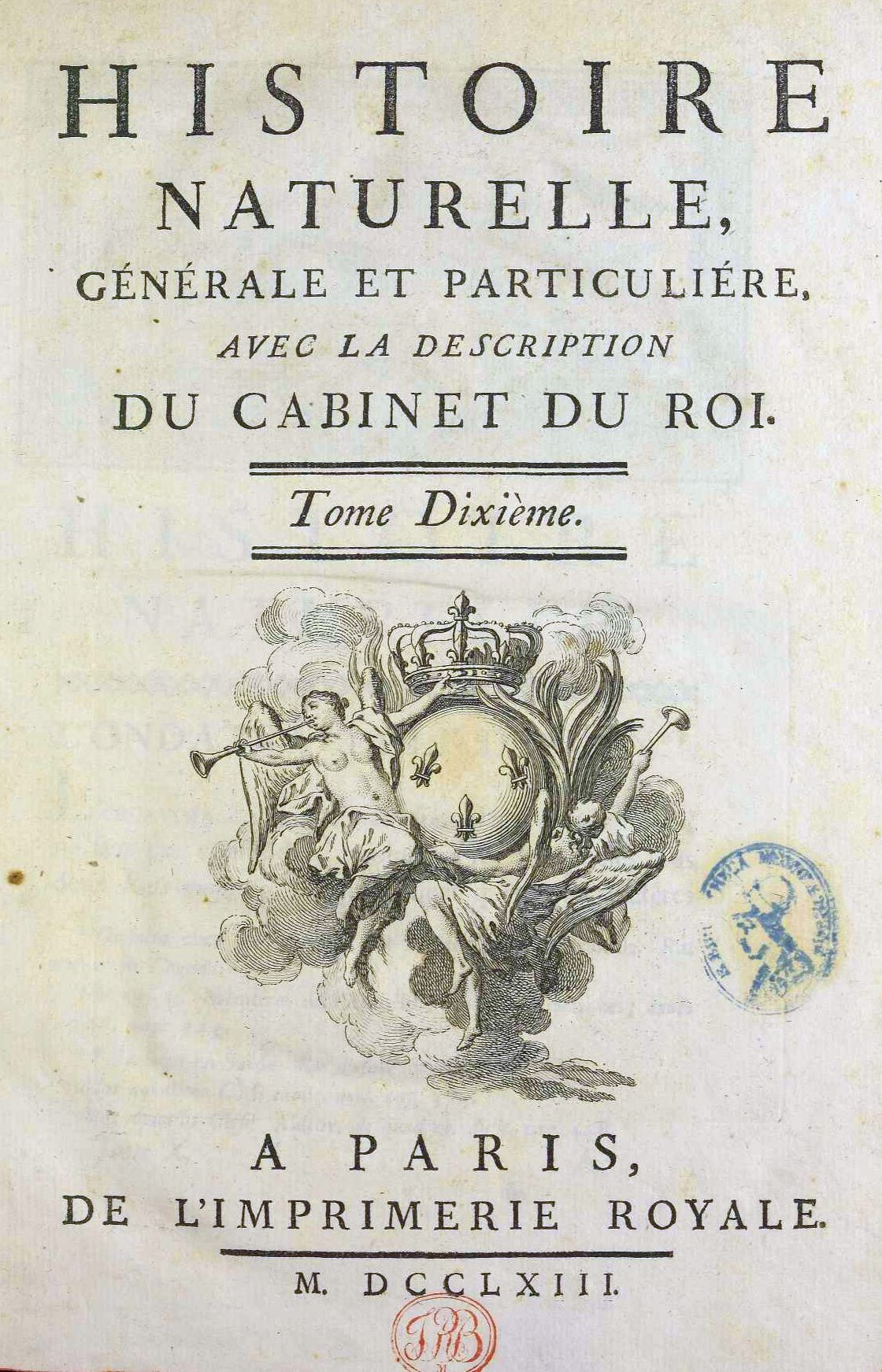
Histoire naturelle, générale et particuliére. Title page of volume 10 (1763).

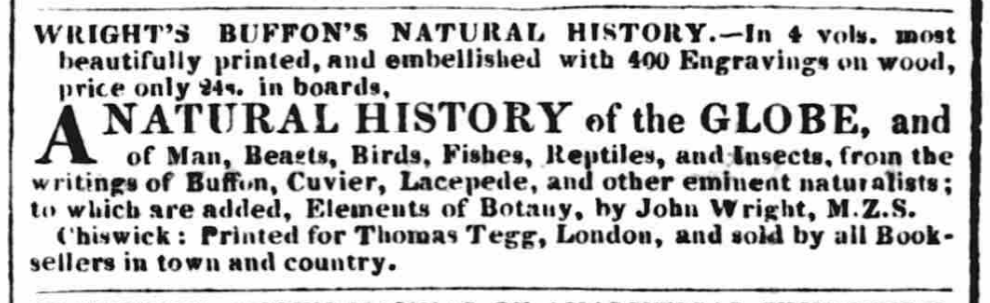
March 1831 advert for "Wright's Buffon's Natural History"

- Histoire naturelle, générale et particuliére, 1749–1767. Paris: Imprimerie Royale.
  - Volumes 3, 4, 5, 6, 7, 10, 11, 13, 14, 15.
  - A four-volume English edition, Buffon's Natural History of the Globe, and of Man: Beasts, Birds, Fishes, Reptiles and Insects, edited by John Wright, was published in 1831, with a second edition, "corrected and enlarged", in 1833.
- Discours sur le style — delivered as speech in 1753, frequently republished

== Anthropological studies ==
Buffon believed in monogenism, the concept that all humanity has a single origin, and that physical differences arose from adaptation to environmental factors, including climate and diet. He speculated on the possibility that the first humans were dark-skinned Africans, but did not pinpoint the area of human origin beyond delineating it as "the most temperate climate [that] lies between the 40th and 50th degree of latitude." This geophysical band encompasses portions of Europe, North America, North Africa, Mongolia, and China.

Controversially for a European of his era, Buffon did not believe that Europe was the cradle of human civilization. Instead he stated that Japanese and Chinese culture were "of a very ancient date," and that Europe "only much later received the light from the East…it is thus in the northern countries of Asia that the stem of human knowledge grew."

Buffon thought that skin color could change in a single lifetime, depending on the conditions of climate and diet. Clarence Glacken suggests that "The environmental changes through human agency described by Buffon were those which were familiar and traditional in the history of Western civilization". However, Buffon also challenged Carl Linnaeus' conceptualization of the fixed division of race. In this sense, Buffon expands his perspective on monogenism that associated these dissimilar traits and features into one larger category rather than in a fixed division. For Buffon, race in a broad sense means larger groups of people who inhabit a continent; while in a narrow sense, it is equivalent to "nation". With this, he implies his ambivalence in defining race by looking at specific traits to differentiate them but at the same time he rejects the idea of categorizing race in a specific fixed division. Therefore, because Buffon seems to favor in working on gerealization and marking the similarities rather than the difference in the race categorization.

== Relevance to modern biology ==
The paradox of Buffon is that, according to Ernst Mayr:

He was not an evolutionary biologist, yet he was the father of evolutionism. He was the first person to discuss a large number of evolutionary problems, problems that before Buffon had not been raised by anybody ... he brought them to the attention of the scientific world.

Except for Aristotle and Darwin, no other student of organisms [whole animals and plants] has had as far-reaching an influence.

He brought the idea of evolution into the realm of science. He developed a concept of the "unity of type", a precursor of comparative anatomy. More than anyone else, he was responsible for the acceptance of a long-time scale for the history of the earth. He was one of the first to imply that you get inheritance from your parents, in a description based on similarities between elephants and mammoths. And yet, he hindered evolution by his frequent endorsement of the immutability of species. He provided a criterion of species, fertility among members of a species, that was thought impregnable.

Buffon wrote about the concept of struggle for existence. He developed a system of heredity which was similar to Darwin's hypothesis of pangenesis. Commenting on Buffon's views, Darwin stated, "If Buffon had assumed that his organic molecules had been formed by each separate unit throughout the body, his view and mine would have been very closely similar."

"Buffon asked most all of the questions that science has since been striving to answer," the historian Otis Fellows wrote in 1970.

His glory lies in what he prepared for his successors: bold and seminal views on the common characters of life's origin, laws of geographical distribution, a geological record of the earth's evolution, extinction of old species, the successive appearance of new species, the unity of the human race.

Buffon's ideas on biological diversity and variability provided the intellectual foundation for the thought of Jean-Baptiste Lamarck, one of the generation of French naturalists who succeeded Buffon.

Charles Darwin wrote in his preliminary historical sketch added to the third edition of On the Origin of Species: "Passing over ... Buffon, with whose writings I am not familiar". Then, from the fourth edition onwards, he amended this to say that "the first author who in modern times has treated it [evolution] in a scientific spirit was Buffon. But as his opinions fluctuated greatly at different periods, and as he does not enter on the causes or means of the transformation of species, I need not here enter on details". Buffon's work on degeneration, however, was immensely influential on later scholars but was overshadowed by strong moral overtones.

== Legacy ==
- Buffon (crater), a lunar impact crater located on the southern hemisphere of the far side of the Moon.
- Lycée Buffon, a secondary school in the 15th arrondissement of Paris.
- Rue Buffon (Paris), a street bordering the Jardin des Plantes in the 5th arrondissement of Paris.
- Rue Buffon (Dijon), a street in Dijon, France.
- An asteroid was named (7420) Buffon.

He has been credited with being the first to estimate the age of the Earth using experimental data, though Isaac Newton had already done so.

== Works ==
Buffon, Œuvres, ed. S. Schmitt and C. Crémière, Paris: Gallimard, 2007.

Complete works

- Vol 1. Histoire naturelle, générale et particulière, avec la description du Cabinet du Roy. (1749).
- Vol 2. (1749).
- Vol 3. (1749).
- Vol 4. (1753).
- Vol 5. (1755).
- Vol 6. (1756).
- Vol. 7. (1758).
- Vol. 8. (1760).
- Vol. 9. (1761).
- Vol. 10. (1763).
- Vol. 11. (1764).
- Vol. 12. (1764).
- Vol. 13. (1765).
- Vol. 14. (1768).
- Vol. 15. (1767).
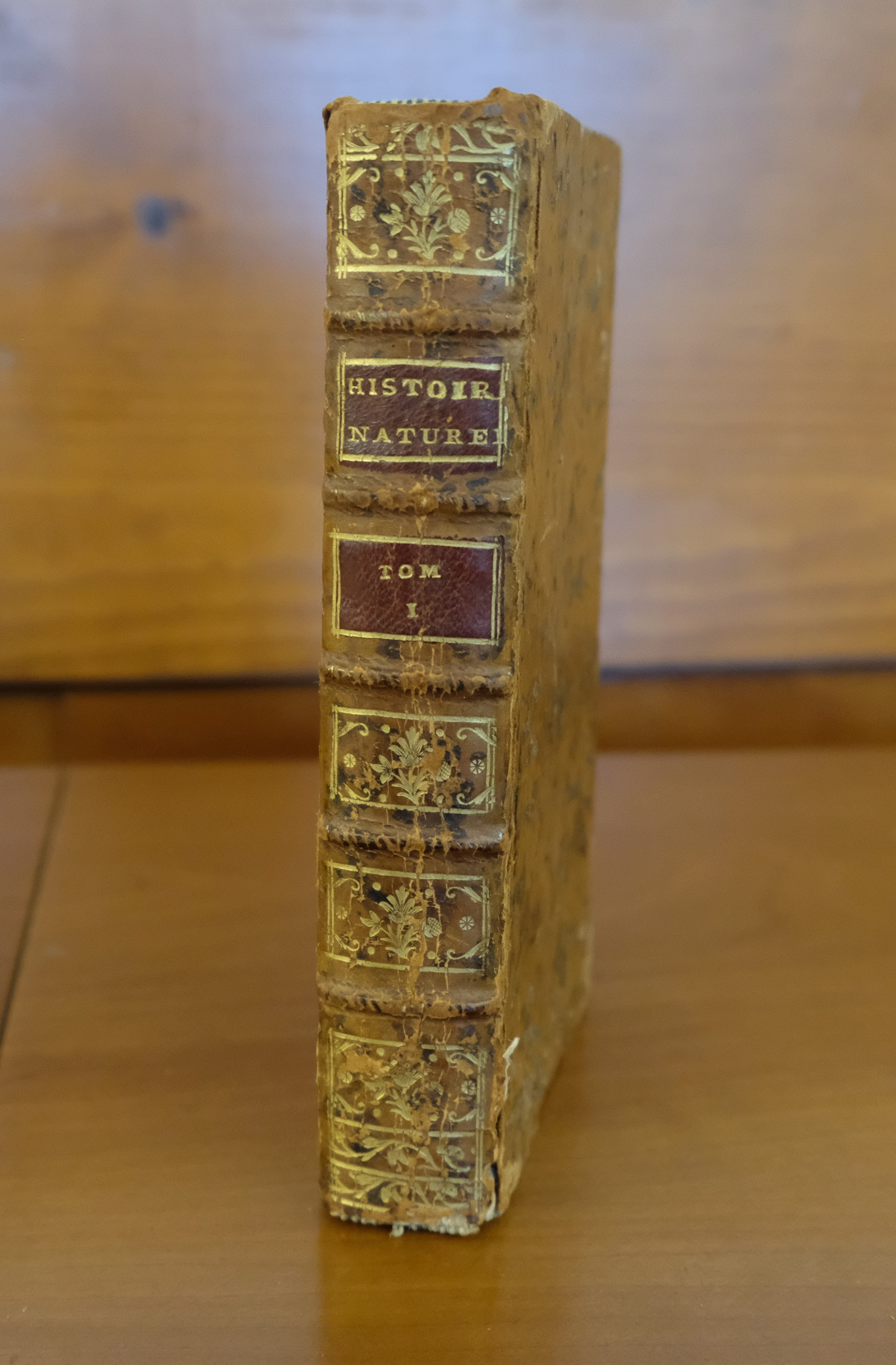
1774 edition of Histoire Naturelle, Générale et Particulière

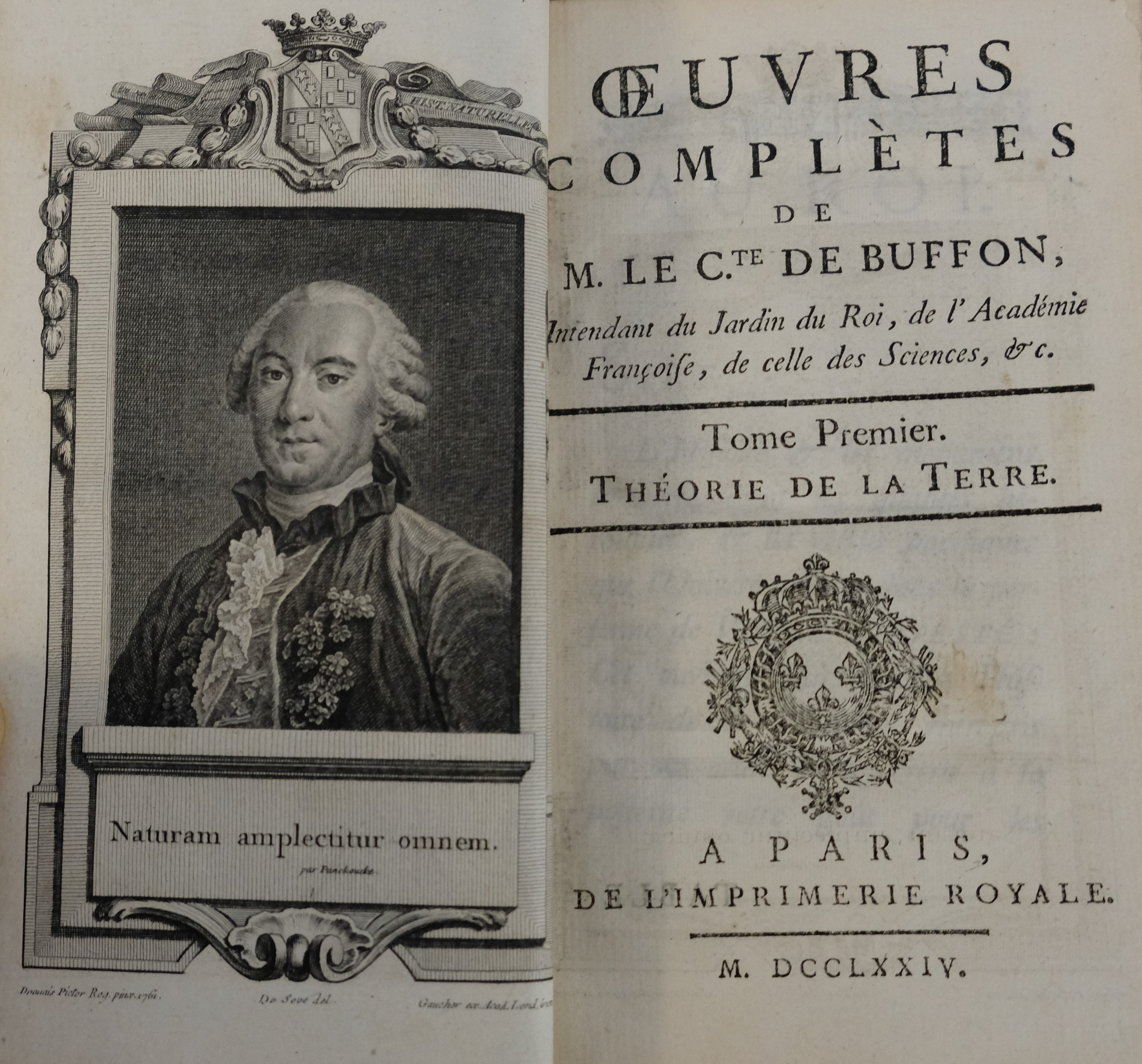
Frontispiece of a 1774 edition of Histoire Naturelle, Générale et Particulière

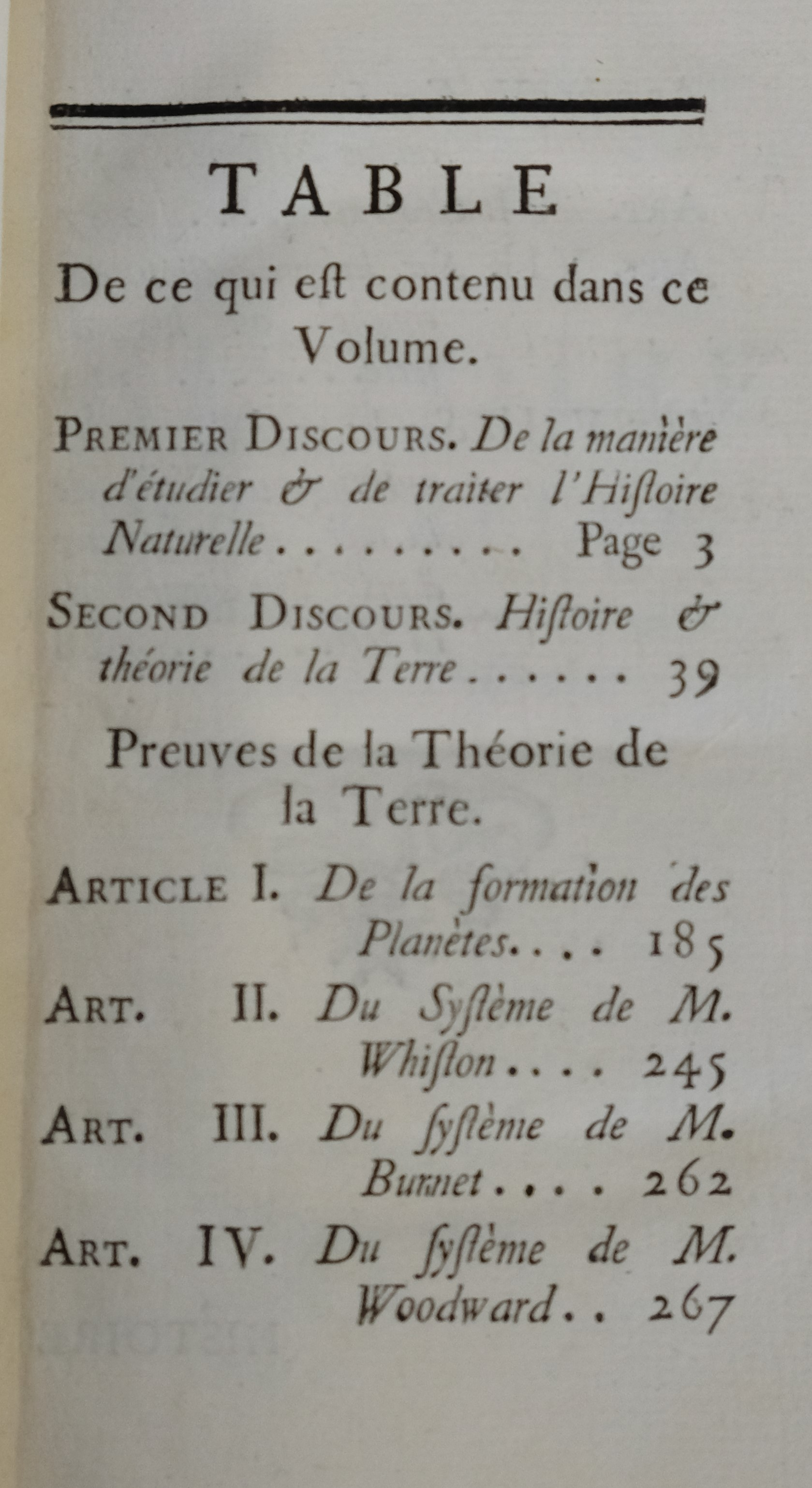
Table of contents of a 1774 edition of Histoire Naturelle, Générale et Particulière

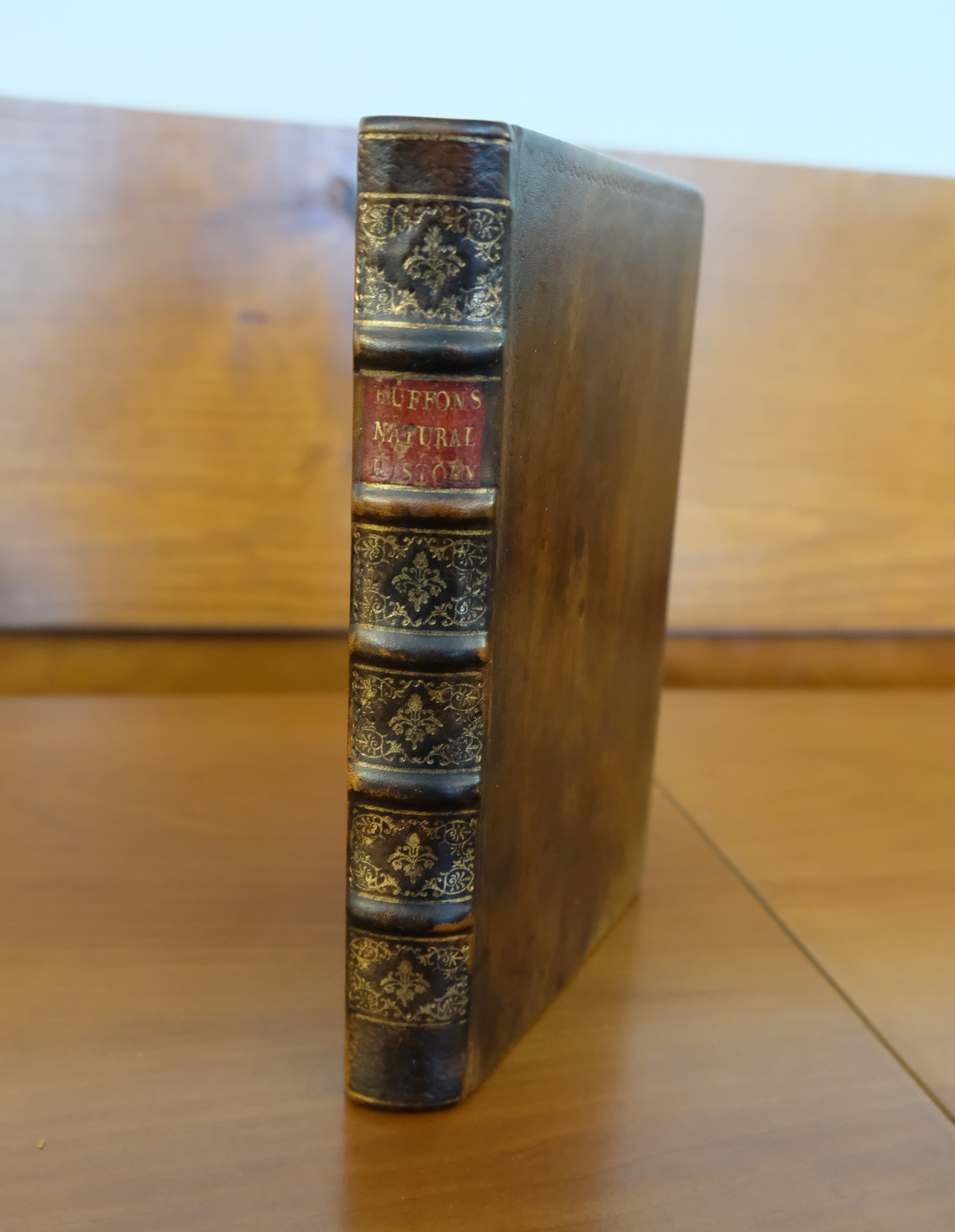
1792 English translation of Buffon's Natural History

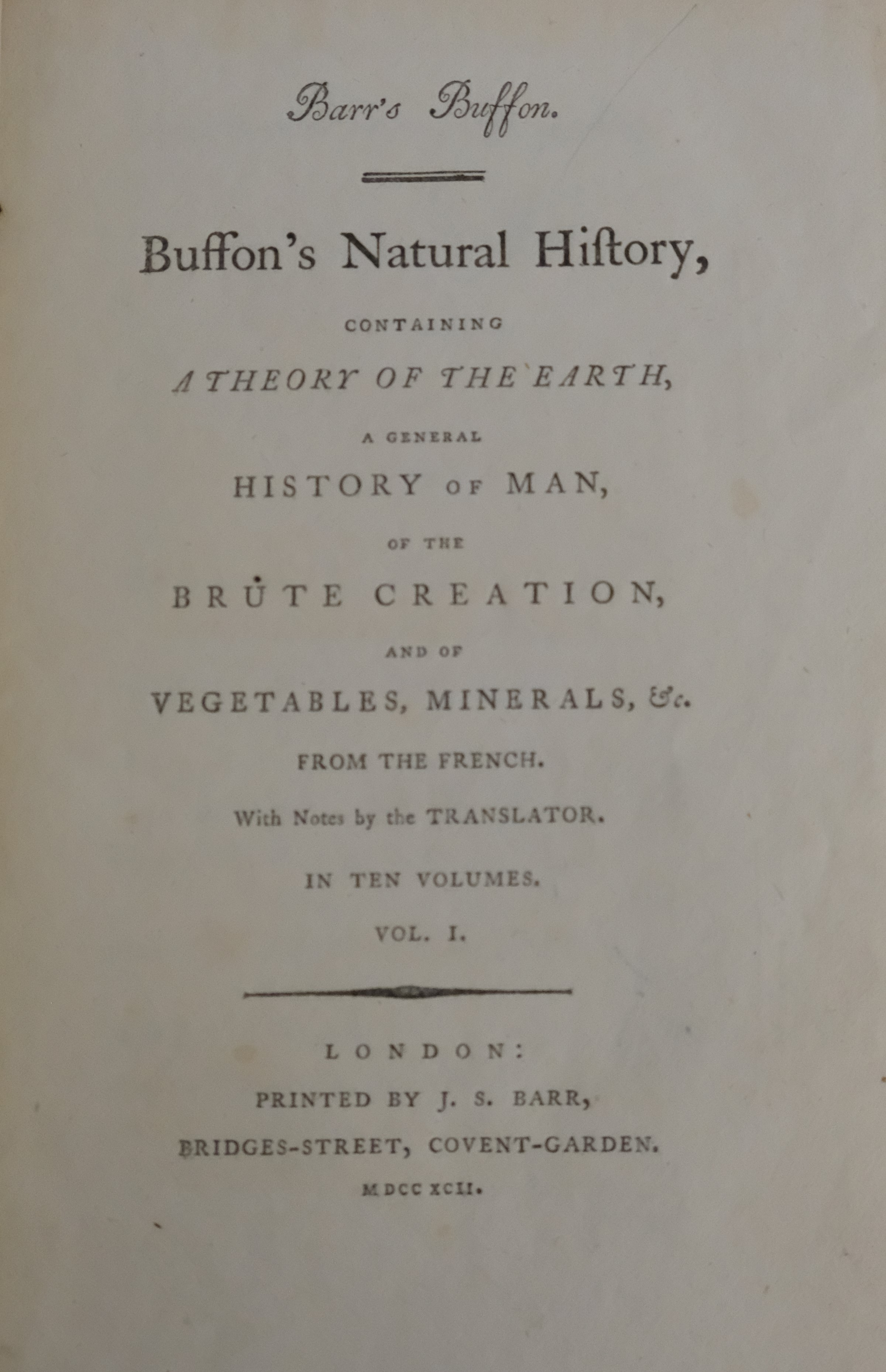
Title page of a 1792 English translation of Buffon's Natural History

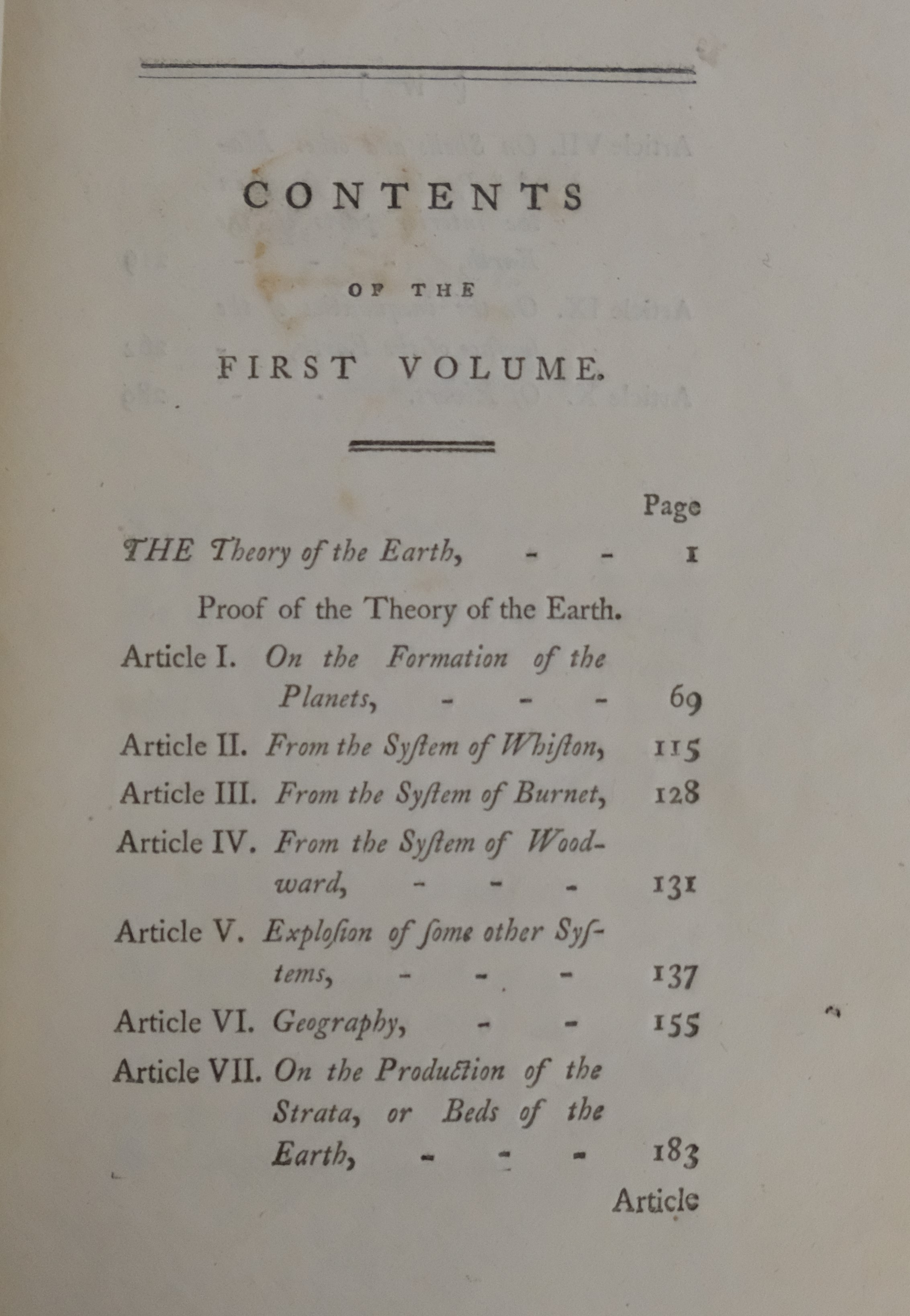
Table of contents page of a 1792 English translation of Buffon's Natural History

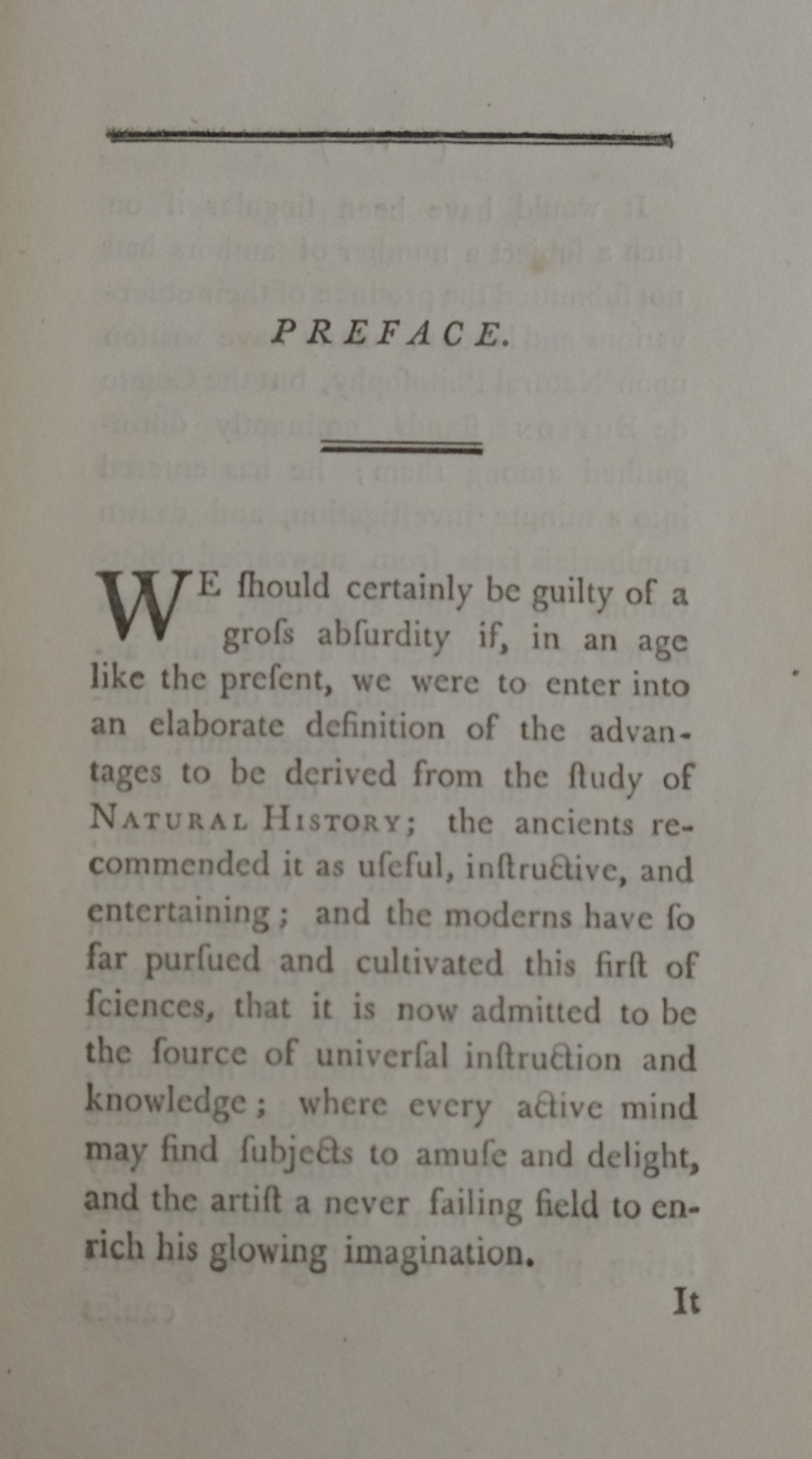
Preface for a 1792 English translation of Buffon's Natural History

== See also ==
- Buffon's needle
- Rejection sampling
- Scientific Revolution
- Suites à Buffon
