= Marguerite Françoise de Buffon =

French noblewoman (1767–1808)

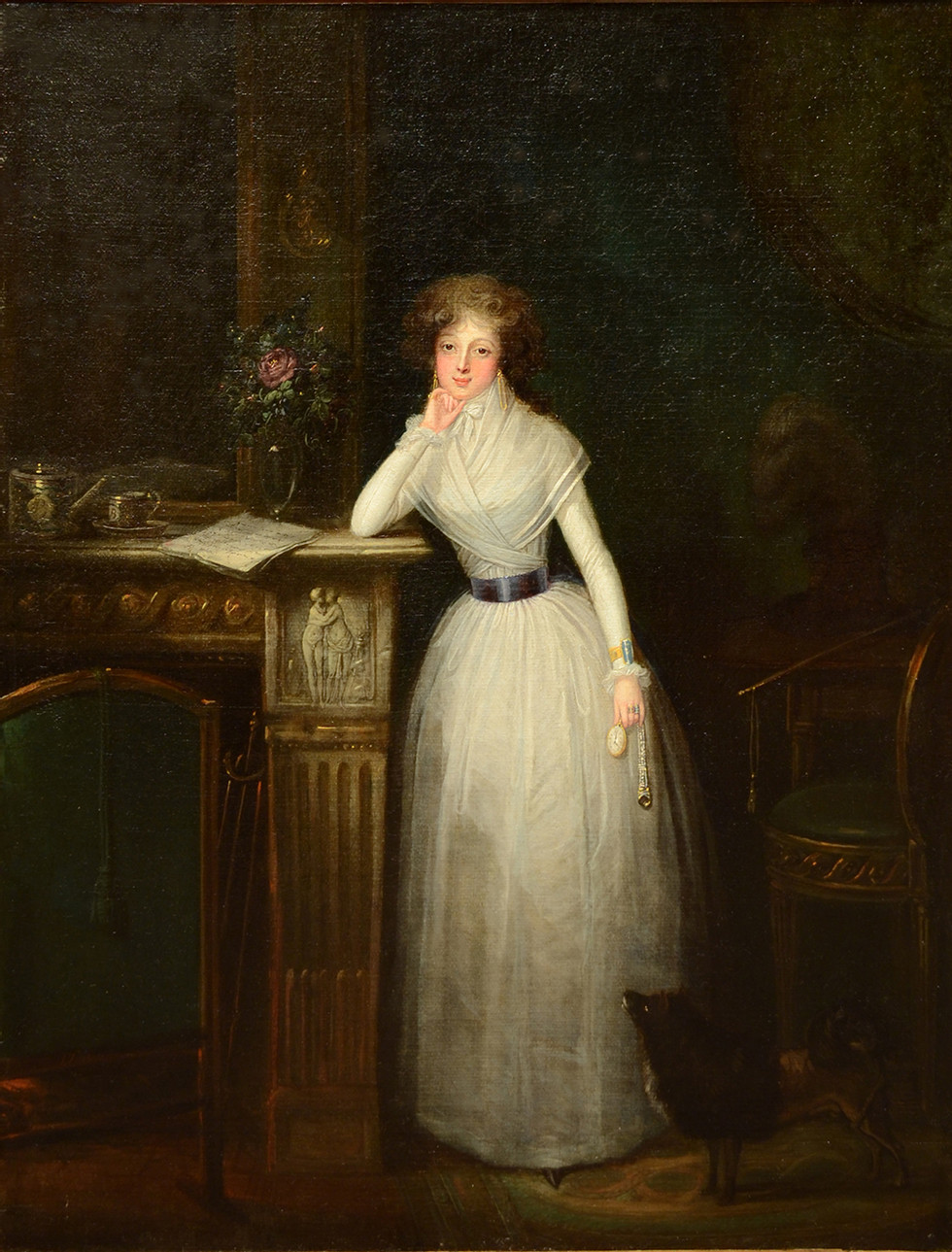
- Born: 1767; France
- Died: 1808 (aged 40–41); England
- Spouse: Wife of Georges Louis Marie Leclerc de Buffon
- Partner: Mistress of Louis Philippe II, Duke of Orléans
- Children: Victor du Buffon
- Parents: Guillaume François de Cepoy (father); Élisabeth Amaranthe Jogues de Martinville (mother)

Marguerite Françoise Bouvier de la Mothe de Cepoy (1767–1808), known as Countess de Buffon, was a French noble, known as the royal mistress of Louis Philippe II, Duke of Orléans from 1784 until 1793.

She was the daughter of marquis Guillaume François de Cepoy and Élisabeth Amaranthe Jogues de Martinville and married Count Georges Louis Marie Leclerc de Buffon (1764-1794) in 1784; the same year, she became the lover of Orléans, with whom she had a son, Count Victor Leclerc de Buffon (1792-1812). During the Terror, she helped the legitimate sons of Orléans escape prison. In 1794, she divorced and emigrated to England, where she became a supporter of Louis Philippe.

She was hosting a dinner party with Orleans when a mob presented the severed head of Marie Thérèse Louise of Savoy, Princesse de Lamballe, Buffon screamed and exclaimed that, "O God! They will carry my head like that someday!"
