= Porte Saint-Antoine =

Demolished city gate of Paris, France

Coordinates: 48.85353°N 2.36859°E

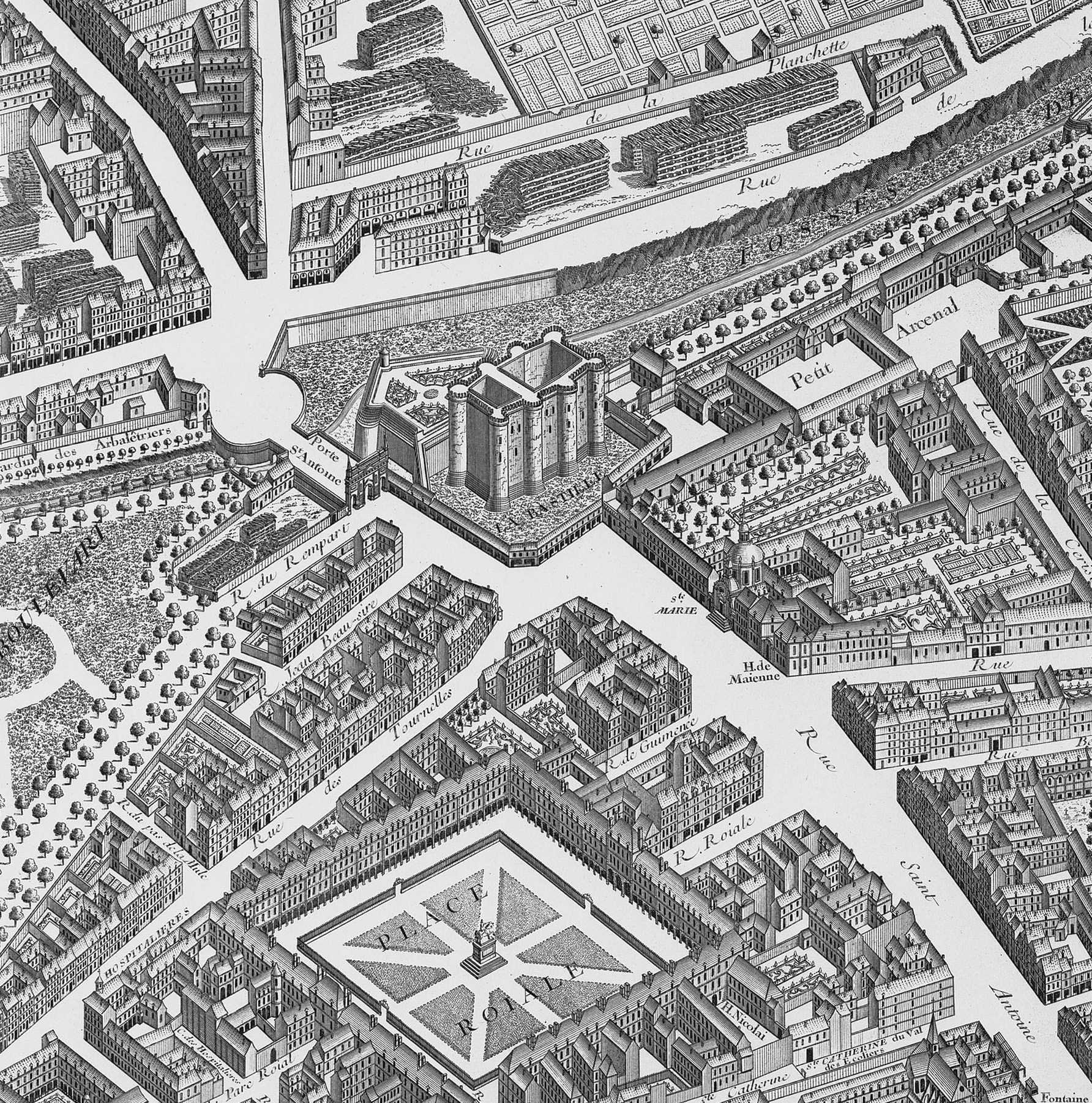
View of the Porte Saint-Antoine and the Bastille (detail from Turgot's 1739 map of Paris)

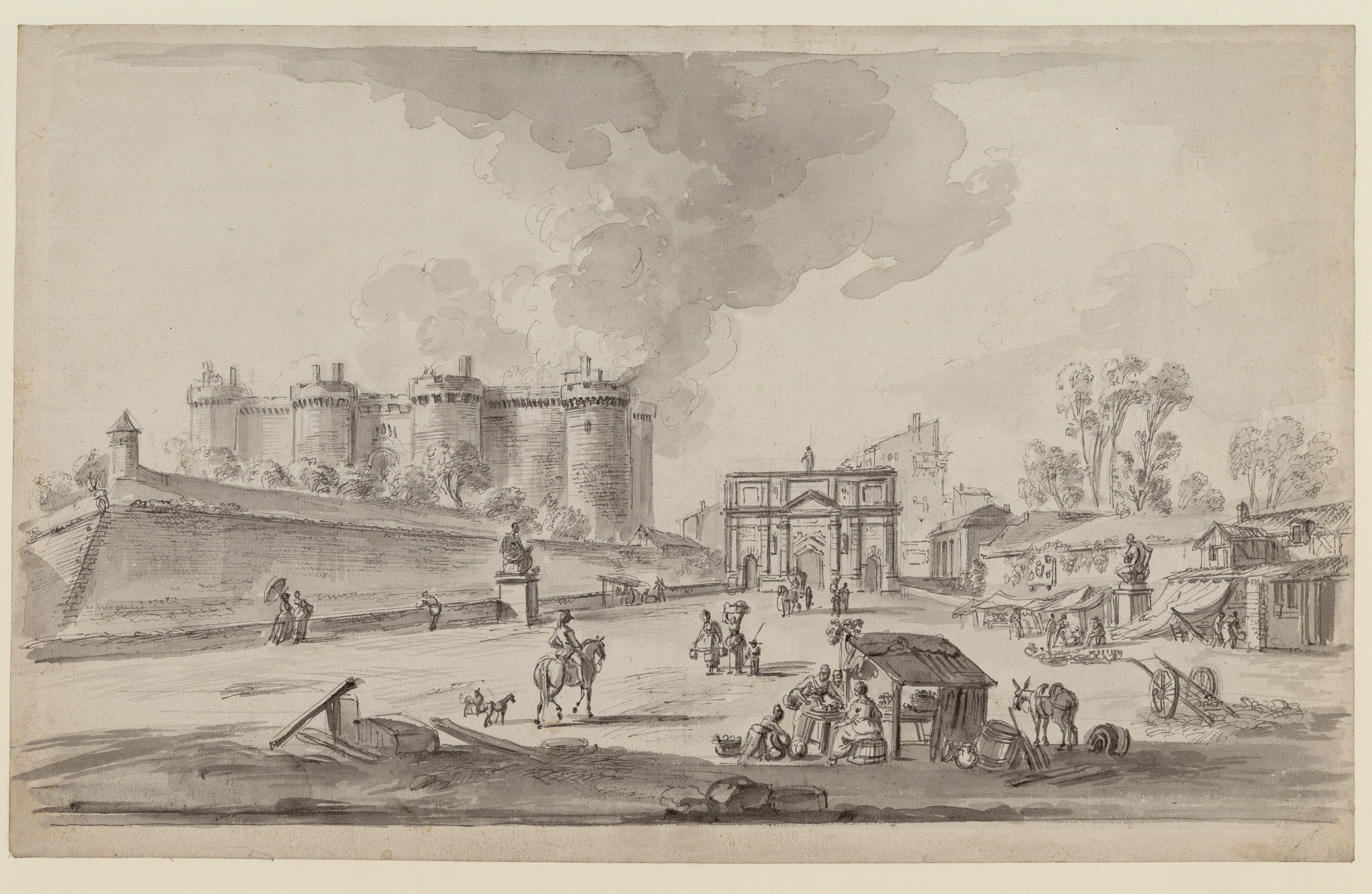
The Porte Saint-Antoine and the Bastille in a 1789 drawing by J.-B. Lallemand.

The Porte Saint-Antoine (French pronunciation: [pɔʁt sɛ̃t‿ɑ̃twan]) was one of the gates of Paris. There were two gates named the Porte Saint-Antoine, both now demolished, of which the best known was that guarded by the Bastille, on the site now occupied by the start of the Rue de la Bastille in the 4th arrondissement of Paris.

== History ==
=== The Faubourg ===
One of the oldest routes through Paris, dating to the Roman era, was that through the centre of the city heading for Meaux and Melun. This road began in Paris with what is now the Rue du Pourtour-Saint-Gervais as far as the Porte Baudoyer, the gate into the 5th-century enclosure level with the Rue des Barres and Place Baudoyer. Beyond the city walls, it was known as the Rue Saint-Antoine (including today's Rue François-Miron and Rue des Barres as far as the Rue de Fourcy), since it served the Abbaye Saint-Antoine-des-Champs (on the site of today's Hôpital Saint-Antoine, in the 12th arrondissement), founded right at the start of the 13th century.

When King Philip II built the Wall of Philip II Augustus, a new gate was built 450 metres beyond the former one, level with 101 Rue Saint-Antoine, just to the east of the crossroads of the Rue Saint-Antoine with the Rue de Sévigné, in front of what is now the Church of Saint-Paul-Saint-Louis. This first gate was sometimes known as the Porte Baudoyer and was demolished in 1382.

=== 1356–1499 ===
In 1356 Charles V of France ordered the building of a new wall to replace Philip II's on the right bank. This new wall had only six gates to allow access into Paris to be controlled – one of these six was the Porte Saint-Antoine, built quickly with two towers. Following Étienne Marcel's revolt (Marcel and 54 of his companions, meanwhile, were killed at the Porte Saint-Antoine while trying to get into Paris by night), the king had fled his residence at the palais de la Cité for his hôtels in the Marais. The king thus demanded the construction of a chastel to protect his residence and the Porte Saint-Antoine – completed in 1382, this chastel became the Bastille. During Charles VI of France's reign, the inhabitants of Paris got through the Porte Saint-Antoine three times to attack the hôtel Saint-Pol and during the Armagnac–Burgundian Civil War 1,500 Armagnacs got through it on 1 June 1418 before being repulsed by the Burgundians.

=== 1500–1778 ===
On 1 June 1540 Charles V, Holy Roman Emperor entered Paris through the Porte Saint-Antoine beside Francis I of France – the Bastille fired an 800-shot salute, the houses nearby were decorated with tapestries and banners and the court, clergy and middle class came out to welcome them. Henry II of France built a single-arch triumphal arch at Porte Saint-Antoine, with sculptures on it by Jean Goujon representing two rivers. He also took part in a tournament by the gate, near hôtel des Tournelles, on 30 June 1559 at which he was mortally wounded. In 1588 Henry I, Duke of Guise forced the disarmed Swiss Guards to leave via the Porte Saint-Antoine and it was also at that gate that the troops of the Catholic League put up their last resistance to Henry IV of France.

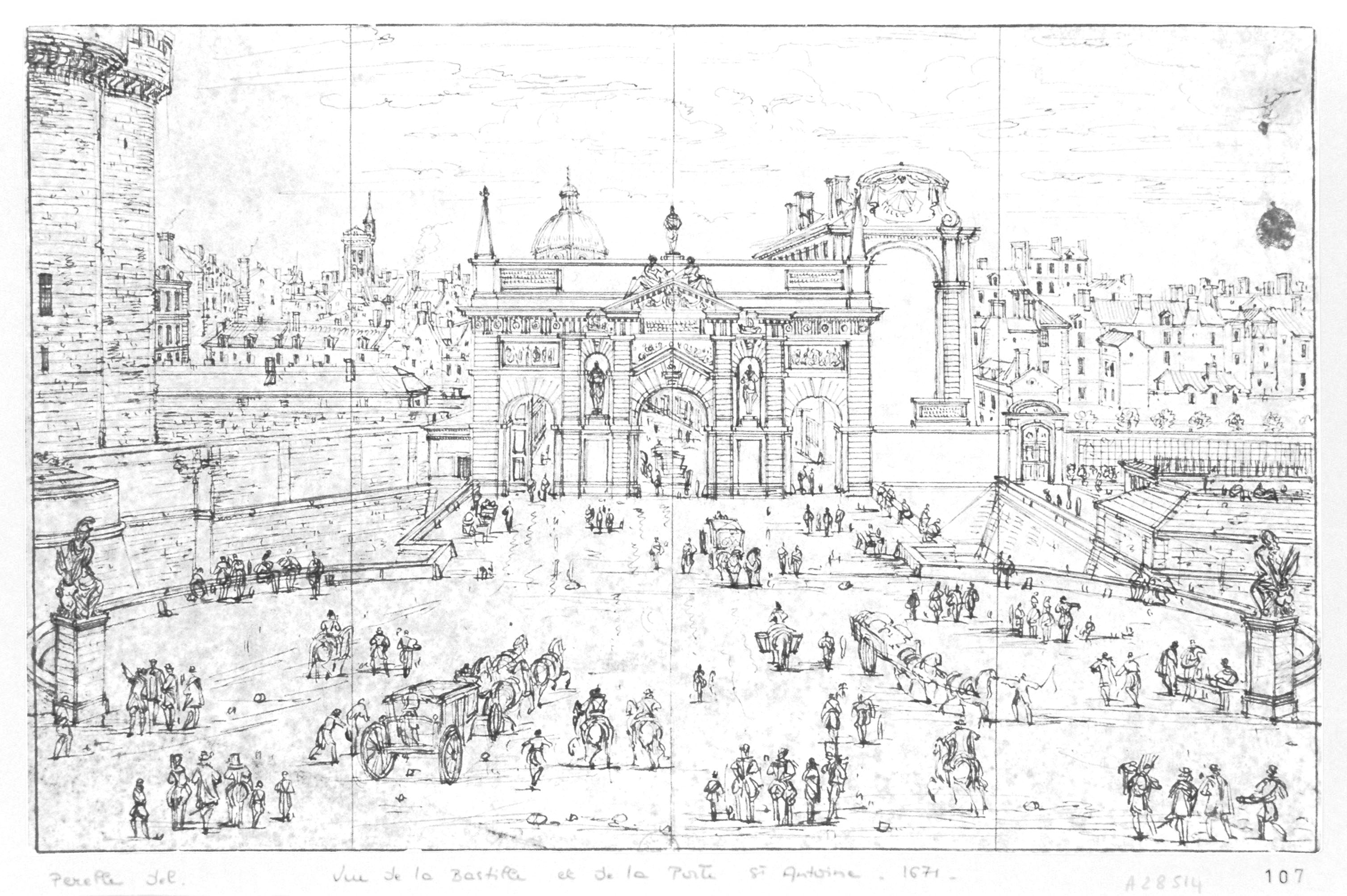
View of the Porte Saint-Antoine in 1671

In 1610 Louis XIII made a ceremonial entry through the gate after his coronation in Reims. In 1648 one of the most important barricades in the popular revolt against Broussel's recall by Cardinal Mazarin was sited at the Porte Saint-Antoine. Four years later, on 2 July 1652, thanks to cannon shots fired from the Bastille on the orders of the Grande Mademoiselle, it was through this gate that the Condé was able to escape the royal troops under Viscount Turenne, Henri de la Tour d'Auvergne, who were pursuing him. In 1670 Nicolas-François Blondel added two arcades to the monument, which he dedicated to Louis XIV, in remembrance of Louis's entry through this gate on his marriage in 1660. For the ceremony, Gérard Van Opstal created three sculptures personifying France, Spain and Hymen, to be placed in niches executed by Michel Anguier. It was demolished in 1778, no longer any use as a fortification and as a blockage to road traffic.

== Sources ==
- http://www.cosmovisions.com/monuParisPorteSaintAntoine.htm
