= Crossing of the Rhine (disambiguation) =

Crossing of the Rhine or Rhine crossing may refer to:

== Military ==
- Crossing of the Rhine, 406 AD, by the Vandals, Alans and Suebi into the Roman Empire, east to west
- By Gustavus Adolphus and the Swedes in 1631 who then captured Mainz, Oppenheim, Mannheim, and Germersheim as part of the Thirty Years War
- By French troops invading the Dutch Republic and Germany during the 1672–1678 Franco-Dutch War:
  - 12 June 1672 in the Battle of Tolhuis
  - 1673, led by Turenne
- In 1744 by a force led by Charles Alexander of Lorraine, during the War of the Austrian Succession, from east to west, near Philippsburg
- Several times by French troops invading Germany during the French Revolutionary Wars:
  - For the first time in 1794, near Düsseldorf
  - On 6 September 1795
  - Rhine Campaign of 1796 § Crossing the Rhine, a French army crossed from west to east
  - On 18 April 1797 near Neuwied, leading to the Battle of Neuwied
  - Between 27 April and 2 May 1800, 100,000 men under Jean Victor Marie Moreau crossed to confront the Austrians at the Battle of Stockach
- From east to west by Prussian and Russian Troops invading France in 1814, near Kaub

=== World War II ===
The crossing from west to east by the western Allies in March 1945 during the Western Allied invasion of Germany:

- Battle of Remagen, on 7 March by the First United States Army
- At Nierstein, on 22 March by the Third United States Army
- Operation Plunder and Operation Varsity, on 23–24 March
  - The associated battle honour "Rhine Crossing" was issued to participating British units
- At Boppard, on 25–26 March by the Third United States Army
- At Worms, on 26 March by the Seventh United States Army

== Art ==
- Crossing of the Rhine by the army of Louis XIV, 1672 painting by Joseph Parrocel
- The Passage of the Rhine, on the Porte Saint-Denis monument in Paris, sculpture by Michel Anguier
- Passage of the Rhine in 1795, painting by Louis-François, Baron Lejeune
- Wilhelm Camphausen's painting General von Blücher Crossing the Rhine

== See also ==
- Rhine
