= Louis-Emmanuel d'Angoulême =

Louis-Emmanuel de Valois
- Duke of Angoulême
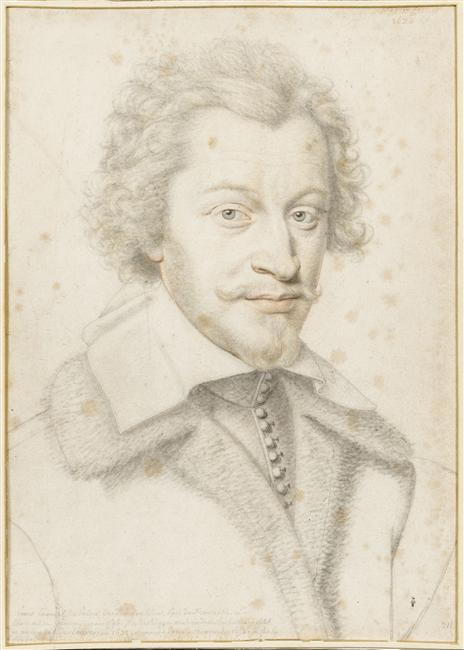
- Louis Emmanuel de Valois, portrait by Daniel Dumonstier, 1628, Musée Condé, Chantilly
- Born: 28 April 1596; Paris, France
- Died: 13 January 1653 (aged 56)
- Spouse: Marie Henriette de La Guiche
- Issue: Louis d'Angoulême; Marie Françoise de Valois, Duchess of Joyeuse; Armand d'Angoulême; François d'Angoulême; Antoine Charles Louis de Valois
- House: Valois
- Father: Charles de Valois, Duke of Angouleme
- Mother: Charlotte de Montmorency

Louis-Emmanuel de Valois (Clermont-en-Auvergne, 28 April 1596 – Paris, 13 November 1653) was count of Auvergne and duke of Angoulême.

== Biography ==
Louis-Emmanuel de Valois, comte d'Alais, was the son of Charles de Valois, the illegitimate son of King Charles IX and Marie Touchet. His mother was Charlotte de Montmorency, daughter of Henri I de Montmorency.

Louis de Valois became Commendatory abbot of the Abbaye de la Chaise-Dieu in 1608, and Commendatory Bishop of Agde in 1612 until 1622, when he renounced his benefices.

On 1 January 1624 he became Colonel-General of the Cavalry and on 17 April 1635 Maréchal de camp. On 29 October 1637 he was appointed Governor of the Provence, starting from January 1638. During the Fronde, he refused to obey the orders of Cardinal Mazarin and was recalled to Court in September 1650. He was replaced as governor in February 1653 and became Minister of State on 20 July 1653. He died 4 months later.

On the death of his father in 1650, he became the 5th Count of Auvergne and Duke of Angoulême.

== Marriage and children ==
Louis-Emmanuel de Valois married on 8 February 1629 with Marie Henriette de La Guiche, dame de Chaumont (died 1682), daughter of Philibert de La Guiche, Grand Master of Artillery. They had:

- Louis d'Angoulême (1630–1637)
- Marie Françoise de Valois (1631–1696), married Louis, Duke of Joyeuse, with issue.
- Armand d'Angoulême (1635–1639)
- François d'Angoulême (1639–1644)

Louis-Emmanuel de Valois also had an illegitimate son: Antoine Charles Louis de Valois (1649–1701), chevalier d'Angoulême.

He was probably responsible for the commissioning of the monumental stables, designed by the noted French architect François Blondel and constructed in 1648–1652 at his wife's Château de Chaumont-la-Guiche, located in Saint-Bonnet-de-Joux (Saône-et-Loire), in a region formerly known as Charolais in southern Burgundy. The stables were designated a French monument historique in 1982 by the French Ministry of Culture. He also owned the Château d'Écouen.

== Sources ==
- Jean Duquesne Dictionnaire des Gouverneurs de Province Éditions Christian, Paris 2002, ISBN 2864960990, p. 189
- Histoire Europe
