= Château de Chaumont-la-Guiche =

Château in Saint-Bonnet-de-Joux, France

- View of the northwest facade

- Location within France

General information
- Architectural style: Late medieval, French Renaissance, Neogothic
- Location: Saint-Bonnet-de-Joux (Saône-et-Loire), France
- Coordinates: 46.49639°N 4.42278°E
- Construction started: 1500

Website
- www.chaumont-laguiche.fr

The French Château de Chaumont-la-Guiche [or -Laguiche] (French pronunciation: [ʃato də ʃomɔ̃ la ɡiʃ]), located in Saint-Bonnet-de-Joux (Saône-et-Loire), in a region formerly known as Charolais in southern Burgundy, was constructed beginning in 1500 for the La Guiche family. The most famous feature of the château is the monumental 17th-century stable block, designed by the noted French architect, François Blondel.

== Description ==
The northwest façade of the corps de logis has tall mullion and transom windows. An openwork stone balustrade runs along the base of the steeply pitched roof, which is pierced with dormers opening into the attic. At the right end is a large square pavilion, which rises an additional storey; toward the left end, a taller octagonal turret encloses a staircase. Each has a separate, steeply pitched roof.

The southeast façade is framed by two towers: a square pavilion to the right and a large round medieval tower to the left (the Tour d'Amboise). Both towers and the corps de logis are surmounted by protruding crenellated parapets, supported by ranges of corbels. The steep roof of the corps de logis has six dormers of a markedly different design than those found on the northwest side. The square tower is also topped by its own steeply pitched roof.

== Architectural history ==
The oldest part of the current château, the western portion of the southeast façade, was constructed between 1500 and 1514, during the reign of Louis XII of France, for Pierre de La Guiche, the king's ambassador to Rome and, by marriage, a nephew of Jacques d'Amboise. The Tour d'Amboise was constructed in 1505. Pierre de La Guiche named his château after the Château de Chaumont-sur-Loire (owned by the House of Amboise) and built it in the style of the châteaux of the Loire Valley.

Construction was continued in 1584 by his son, Philibert de La Guiche, governor of Lyonnais and grand maître de l'artillerie from 1578 to 1596. In the 17th century the château was completed by the addition of two wings perpendicular to the corps de logis with pavilions at the far ends, forming an interior courtyard opening to the north. These were pulled down in 1805. Neo-Gothic elements, including the octagonal stair turret on the northwest façade and the square pavilion at the east end of the southeast façade, were added to the château in 1850.

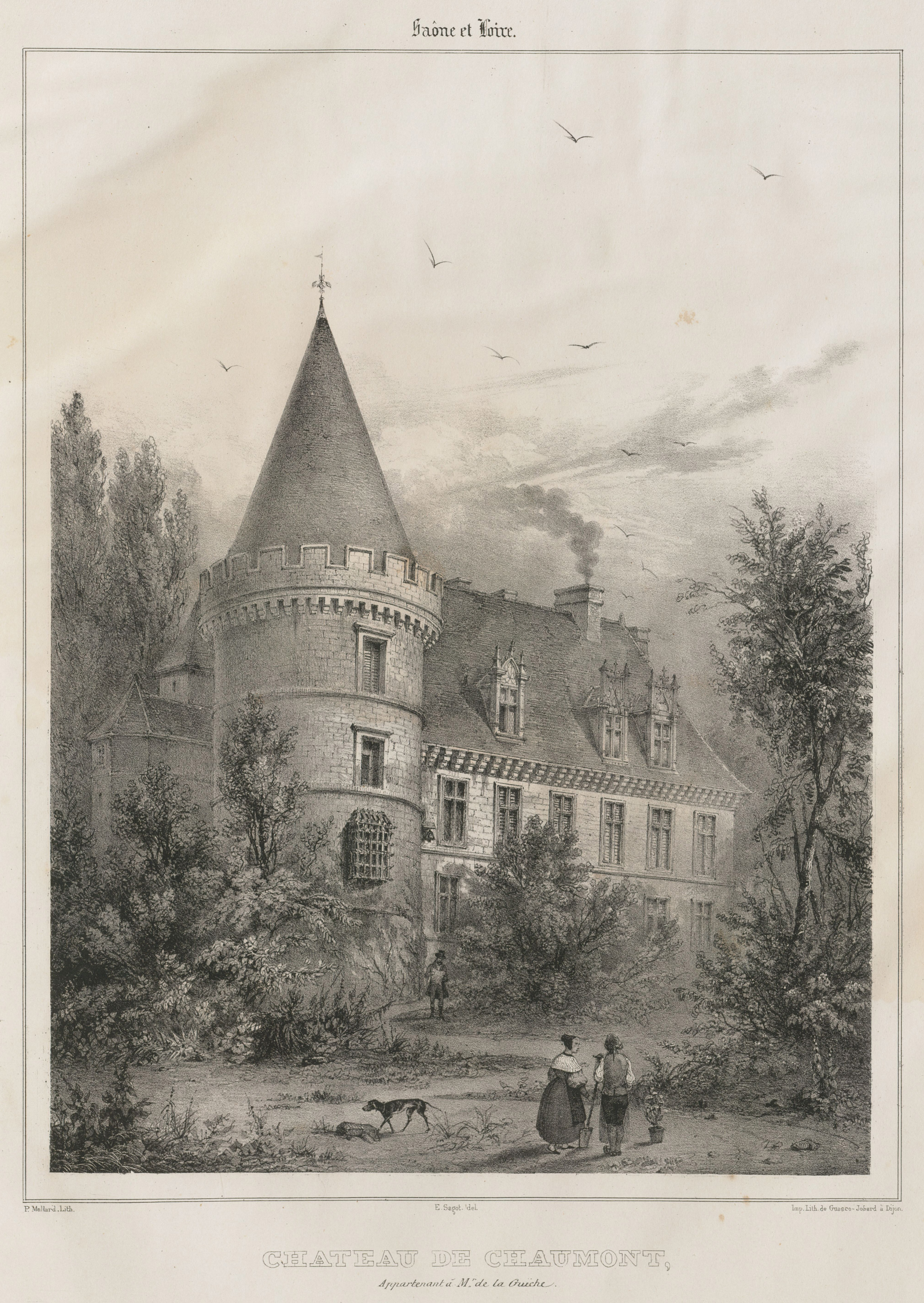
View from the south, 1835 lithograph by Émile Sagot

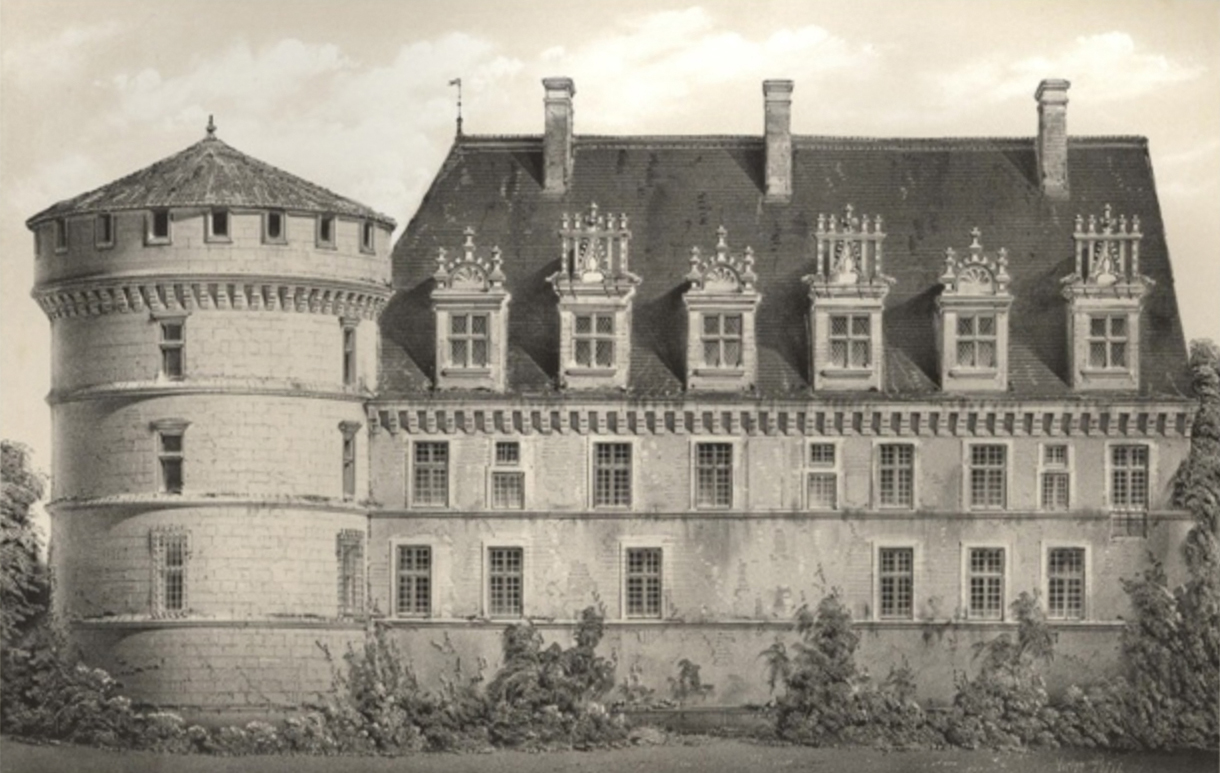
The southeast façade in the mid-19th century

View from the south, 1909 drawing by Blanche McManus

== The stables ==
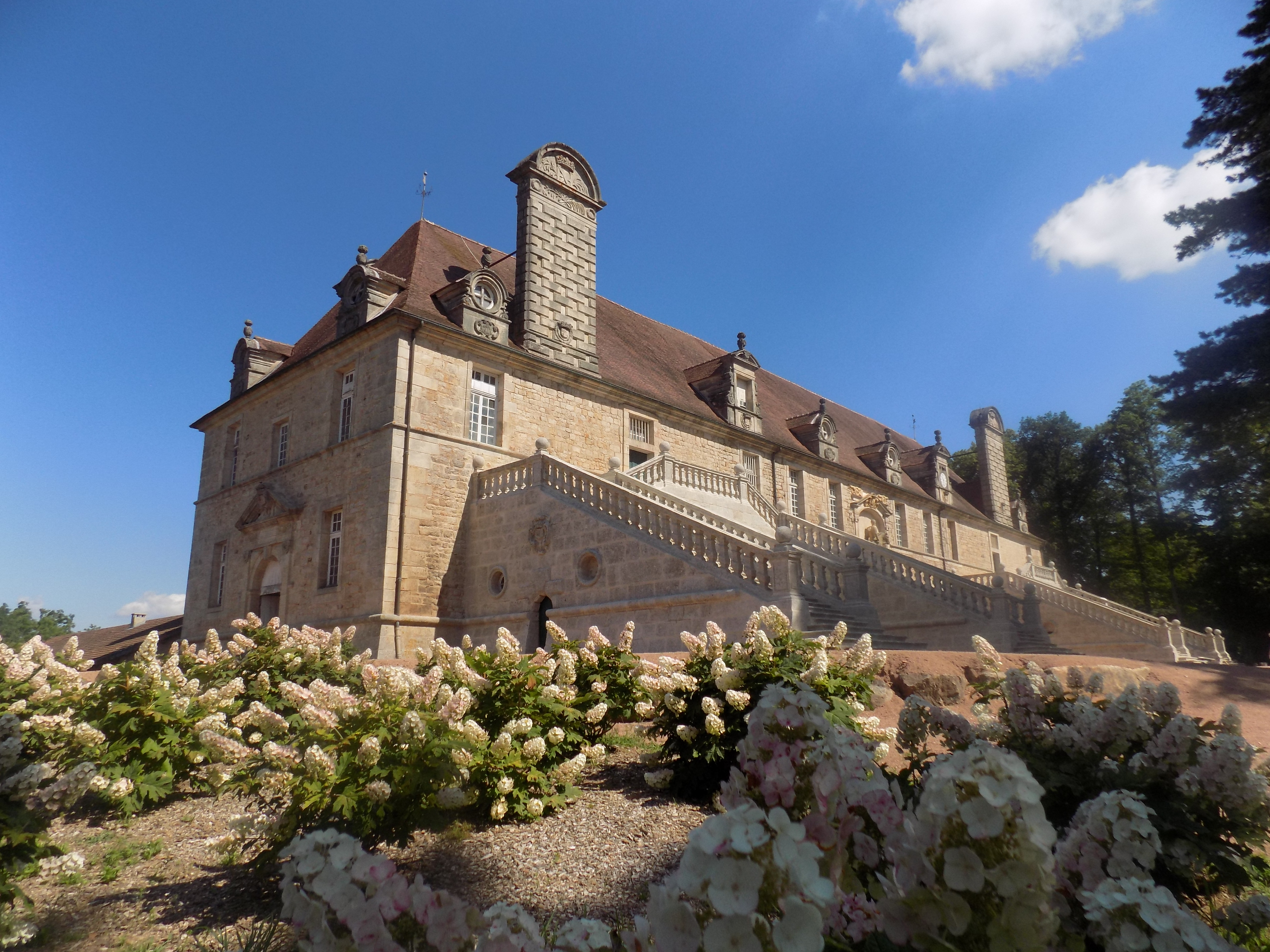
The grand stables in 2018 (at 46.49627°N 4.42127°E)

The most notable feature at the château is the famous stable block, a vast rectangular building with two monumental stone-balustraded exterior double staircases flanking the main entrance. The latter is surmounted by a life-sized equestrian statue of Philibert de La Guiche, "an imperial motif unprecedented in a building of this sort". The identity of the horseman is suggested by reliefs of two cannons above the pediment. Two large, very tall stone chimneys loom over the extremities of the building. The cross-vaulted ground floor is divided into three aisles by 56 Tuscan columns in two parallel arcades. The outer two aisles contain stalls for more than 80 horses.

The stables were erected from 1648 to 1652 by the local mason and entrepreneur François Martel, who is often credited with the design, but François Blondel claimed it as his own in a note in his 1685 edition of Louis Savot's L'architecture françoise. Henriette de La Guiche, the daughter of Philibert, built the stables for her second husband, Louis-Emmanuel de Valois, comte d'Alais, colonel général of the king's cavalry, governor of Provence, and a grandson of Charles IX of France. Alais had also inherited the Château d'Écouen. These royal connections account for the monumentality of the design. Alais probably knew Blondel via the military. Alais could not have used the stables much. He died in the year after its completion.

The stables have been classified as a Monument historique since 1982 by the French Ministry of Culture.

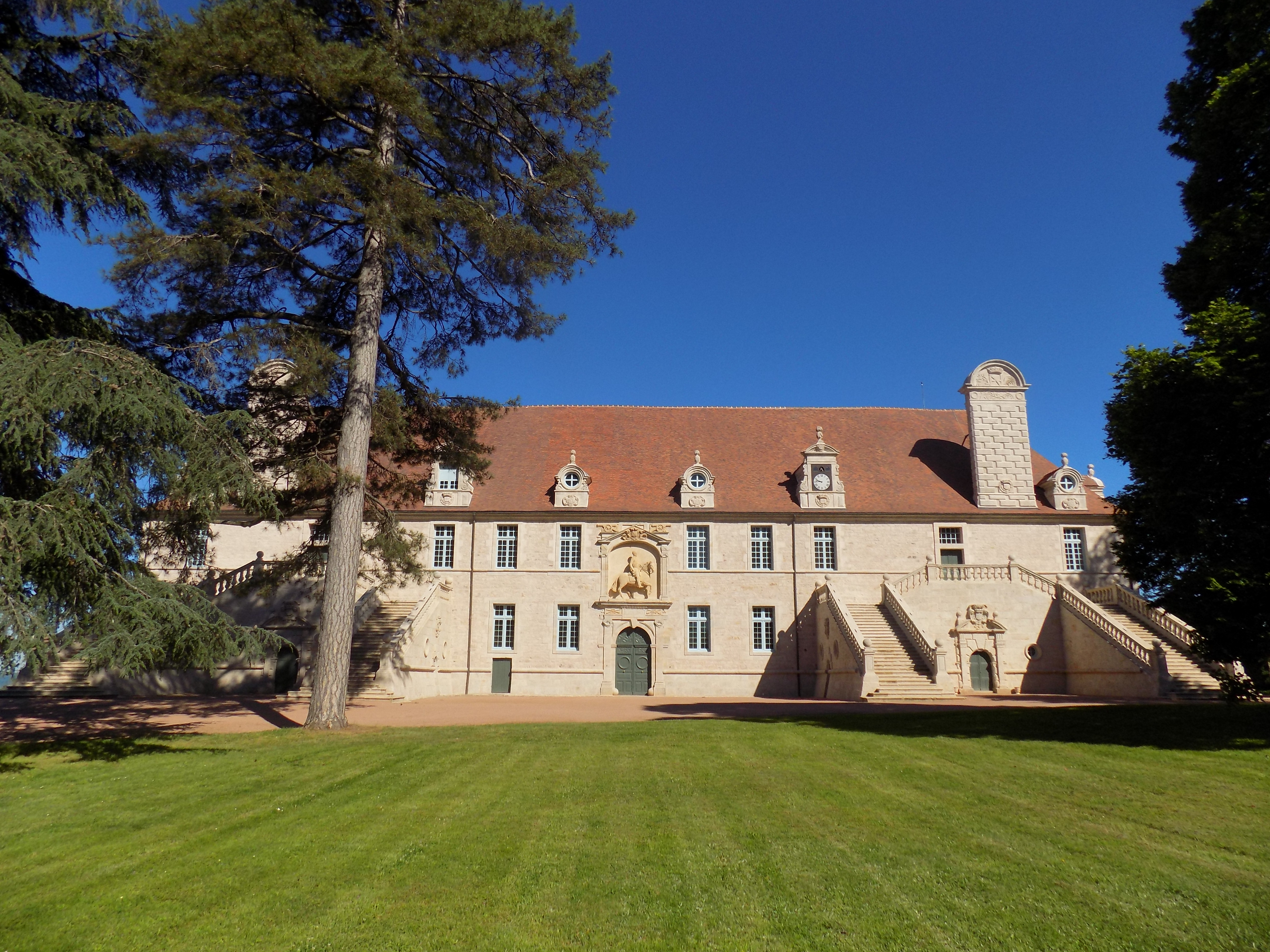
In June 2021 after a restoration

Postcard

== Bibliography ==
- Babelon, Jean-Pierre (1989). Châteaux de France au siècle de la Renaissance. Paris: Flammarion/Picard. ISBN 9782080120625.
- Ganay, Ernest de (1953). Châteaux de France: Normandie et régions nord et est. Éditions Tels. OCLC 25795400
- Gerbino, Anthony (2010). François Blondel: Architecture, Erudition, and the Scientific Revolution. London and New York: Routledge. ISBN 9780415491990.
- Hautecoeur, Louis (1948). Histoire de l'architecture classique en France. Tome II, Le règne de Louis XIV. Paris: A. et J. Picard. OCLC 489700000, 489711032.
- Herrmann, Wolfgang (1982). "Blondel, François", vol. 1, pp. 216–219, in Macmillan Encyclopedia of Architects, 4 volumes, edited by Adolf K. Placzek. New York: The Free Press. ISBN 9780029250006.
