= François Blondel =

French architect and soldier (1618-1686)

- Born: Nicolas-François Blondel c. 10 June 1618; Ribemont
- Died: 21 January 1686 (aged 67); Paris
- Occupation: Architect

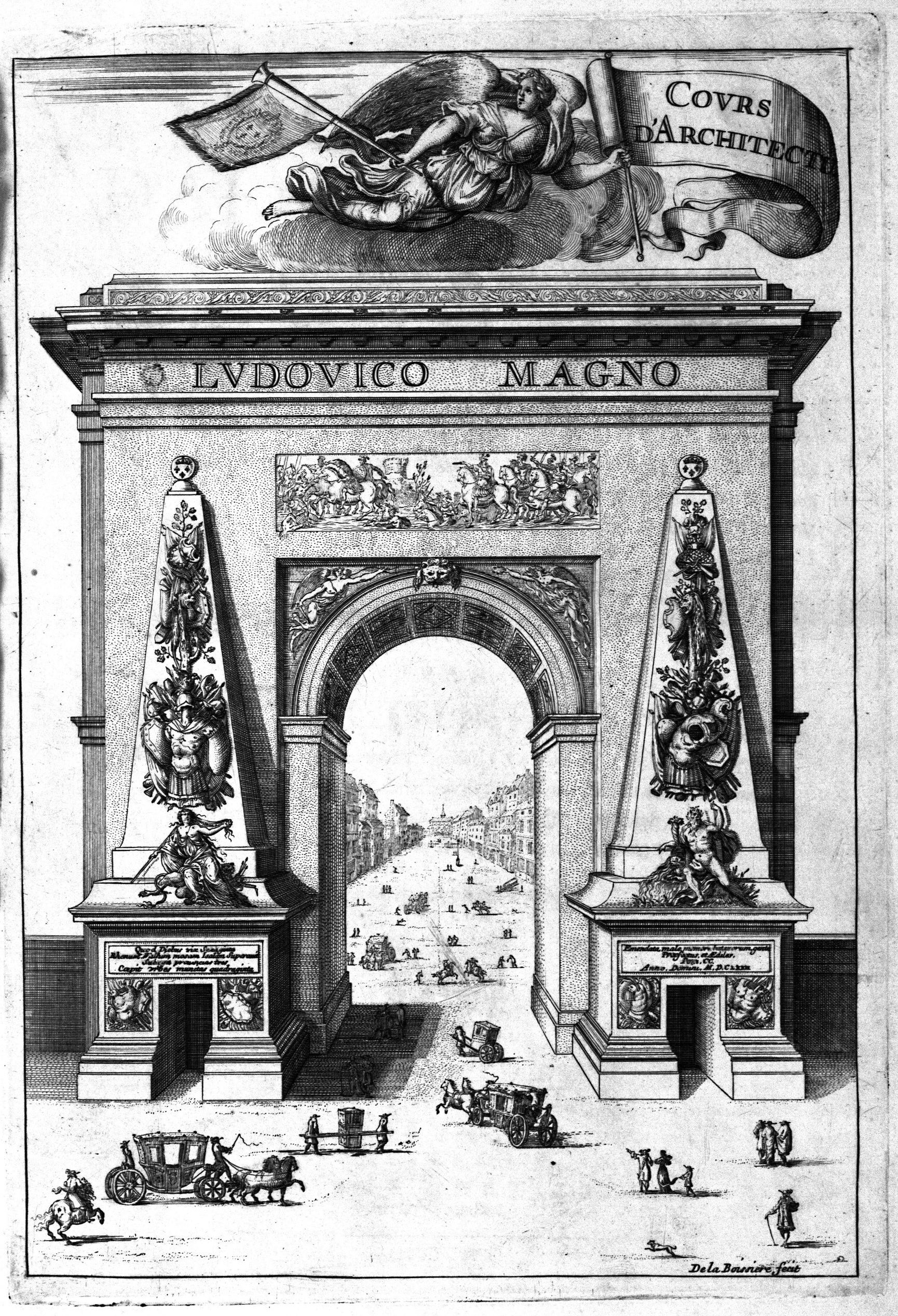
Blondel's Porte Saint-Denis: frontispiece to the Cours d'architecture

François Blondel (French pronunciation: [fʁɑ̃swa blɔ̃dɛl]; c. 10 June 1618 – 21 January 1686) was a soldier, engineer of fortifications, mathematician, diplomat, military and civil engineer and architect, called "the Great Blondel", to distinguish him in a dynasty of French architects. He is remembered for his Cours d'architecture which remained a central text for over a century. His precepts placed him in opposition with Claude Perrault in the larger culture war known under the heading Querelle des anciens et des modernes. If François Blondel was not the most highly reputed among the académiciens of his day, his were the writings that most generally circulated among the general public, the Cours de Mathématiques, the Art de jetter les Bombes, the Nouvelle manière de fortifier les places and, above all his Cours d'Architecture.

== Early life ==
Born Nicolas-François Blondel at Ribemont in the Picardy region of France, he was baptized on 15 June 1618. His father was François-Guillaume Blondel, who studied law in Toulouse and bought the position of avocat du roi in Ribemont after receiving his degree in 1624. Nicolas-François' mother was Marie de Louen, whose family belonged to the local nobility. Although his father François-Guillaume was not born a nobleman, he was able to purchase (or inherit via his wife's relations) two close by seigneuries, Gaillardon in 1620 and Les Croisettes before 1635, and was the mayor of Ribemont several times in the 1630s and 1640s. Nicolas-François was well educated in languages as a youth, and participated for a time in the Thirty Years' War.

== Career ==
In 1640 Cardinal Richelieu entrusted Blondel with diplomatic missions in Portugal, Spain and Italy, which gave him an opportunity to study at first hand the fortification systems of those nations. He returned from Italy with a greatly enhanced knowledge of mathematics, and it may have been during this trip that he met Galileo, with whom he later claimed to have studied personally. Blondel subsequently became one of Galileo's earliest French supporters.

Richelieu named Blondel sub-lieutenant of one of his galleys, La Cardinale, aboard which he participated in the attack on the port of Tarragona and served for a time as governor at Palamos. In 1647 Blondel commanded the artillery of the naval expedition against the Spanish at Naples. With the peace he finished his military career with the brevet of maréchal des camps (26 November 1652).

The grand stables at the Château de Chaumont-la-Guiche

Around 1648 Blondel received his first architectural commission, the grand stables at the Château de Chaumont-la-Guiche in Saint-Bonnet-de-Joux in southern Burgundy. The stables were executed 1648–1652 by the local mason and entrepreneur François Martel, to whom the design has frequently been attributed. However, Blondel mentions that he was responsible in a note in his 1685 edition of Louis Savot's L'architecture françoise, and, according to his biographer Anthony Gerbino, there is no reason to question Blondel's claim. The cross-vaulted ground floor is divided into three aisles by two Tuscan arcades with stalls for more than eighty horses. On the exterior of the entrance front are two impressive double staircases ascending to a large hall on the upper floor. They frame the central portal, strikingly surmounted by a life-sized equestrian statue of the previous seigneur, Philibert de La Guiche. His daughter, Henriette de La Guiche built the stables for her husband, who at the time was Louis-Emmanuel de Valois, comte d'Alais, the governor of Provence and a grandson of Charles IX of France. Alais also owned the Château d'Écouen. These royal connections account for the monumentality of the design. Alais probably met Blondel in the military.

In 1652 Blondel became the tutor of the son of the Secretary of State for foreign affairs, Loménie de Brienne, with whom he made the Grand Tour : Langres — Besançon — Basel — Alsace (Brisach) — Strasbourg (where he inspected the mechanism of the famous clock) — Philippsburg — Mannheim — Mayence — The Hague — Hamburg — Lübeck — Kiel — Denmark — Sweden (Stockholm, Uppsala) — Finland — Estonia (Riga) — Königsberg — Dantzig — Cracow — Pressburg — Vienna — Prague — Vence — Rome — Florence — Toulon. His travels would stand him in good stead when he came to compile his Cours d'Architecture. During the 1660s Blondel made a second tour with a son of Jean Baptiste Colbert, of which the itinerary is less known.

In 1656, Blondel was named reader in Mathematics and Fortification at the Collège Royal, where his place was filled during his numerous absences by the astronomer Picard. From 1662 to 1668, Blondel exercised the functions of Syndic of the college.

In the years 1657 to 1663 Mazarin sent him on diplomatic missions in Italy, Egypt, Greece, Turkey, Germany, Poland, Moscow (where he regretted not having seen the fortifications at Kazan against the Tatars, and found that the maritime defenses were in the Dutch manner), Prussia, Livonia (with the Swedish fortifications of Riga), and Lithuania. In the course of his travels he encountered Paul Wurz, occasioning the correspondence that resulted in Blondel's first publication, a mathematical pamphlet entitled Epistola ad P. W. [Paulum Wurzium], which discussed the breaking resistance of beams. Blondel demonstrates that a mathematical proof of Galileo, allowing the cross-section of a beam to be parabolically shaped such that its weight was reduced by one third, only applied to cantilevered beams and did not apply to the specified aim, a beam supported at both ends, for which a semicircular or elliptical shape would apply. Some of these questions were taken up again in 1673, when he published his Résolution des quatre principaux problèmes d'Architecture.

In 1659, on a voyage to Constantinople he saw an aqueduct "in a place that one calls Belgrade, which by its grandeur, its height and the magnificence of its structure, cedes nothing to that of the Pont du Gard." That same year he was posted as diplomatic resident to Copenhagen, and post he filled until 1663, when he was recalled to France to become a conseiller d'État.

The following year, 1664, Colbert named him Ingénieur du Roy pour la Marine, which occasioned his supervision of harbour fortifications in Normandy (Cherbourg, Le Havre), in Brittany and in the Antillies (Martinique, Guadeloupe, Saint-Domingue), where he witnessed at first hand the prodigious effects of a hurricane at the island of Saint-Christophe, and where he found the materials for numerous memoires presented to the Académie des Sciences.

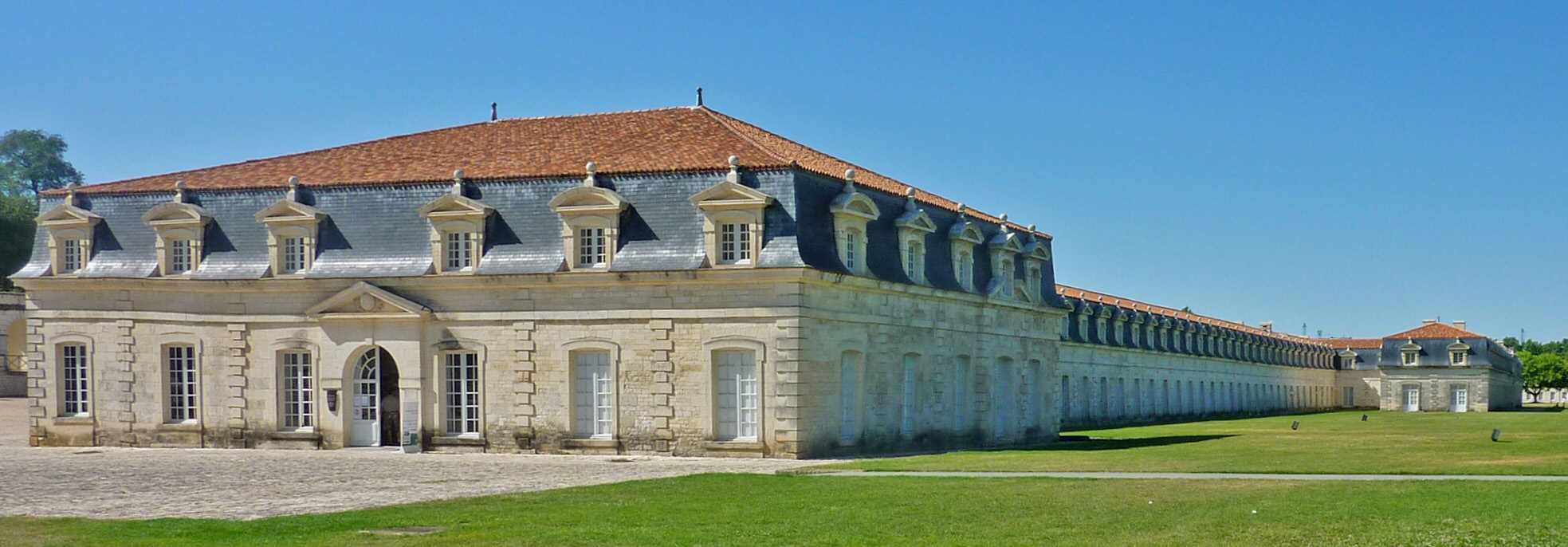
The Corderie Royale at Rochefort

Quatremère de Quincy reported that Blondel's talents for architecture were first tested in 1665, in building the royal corderie (ropewalk) at Rochefort. Blondel was also put in charge of constructing the Roman bridge at Saintes.

In 1669, Blondel was admitted to the Académie des Sciences as a geometer (cartographer). That year, in the course of a trip to London in the company of Jean-Baptiste du Hamel, secretary of the Académie, he witnessed an unsuccessful blood transfusion effected by the Royal Society in hopes of curing a madman, with the thought that the human passions were transmitted in the blood.

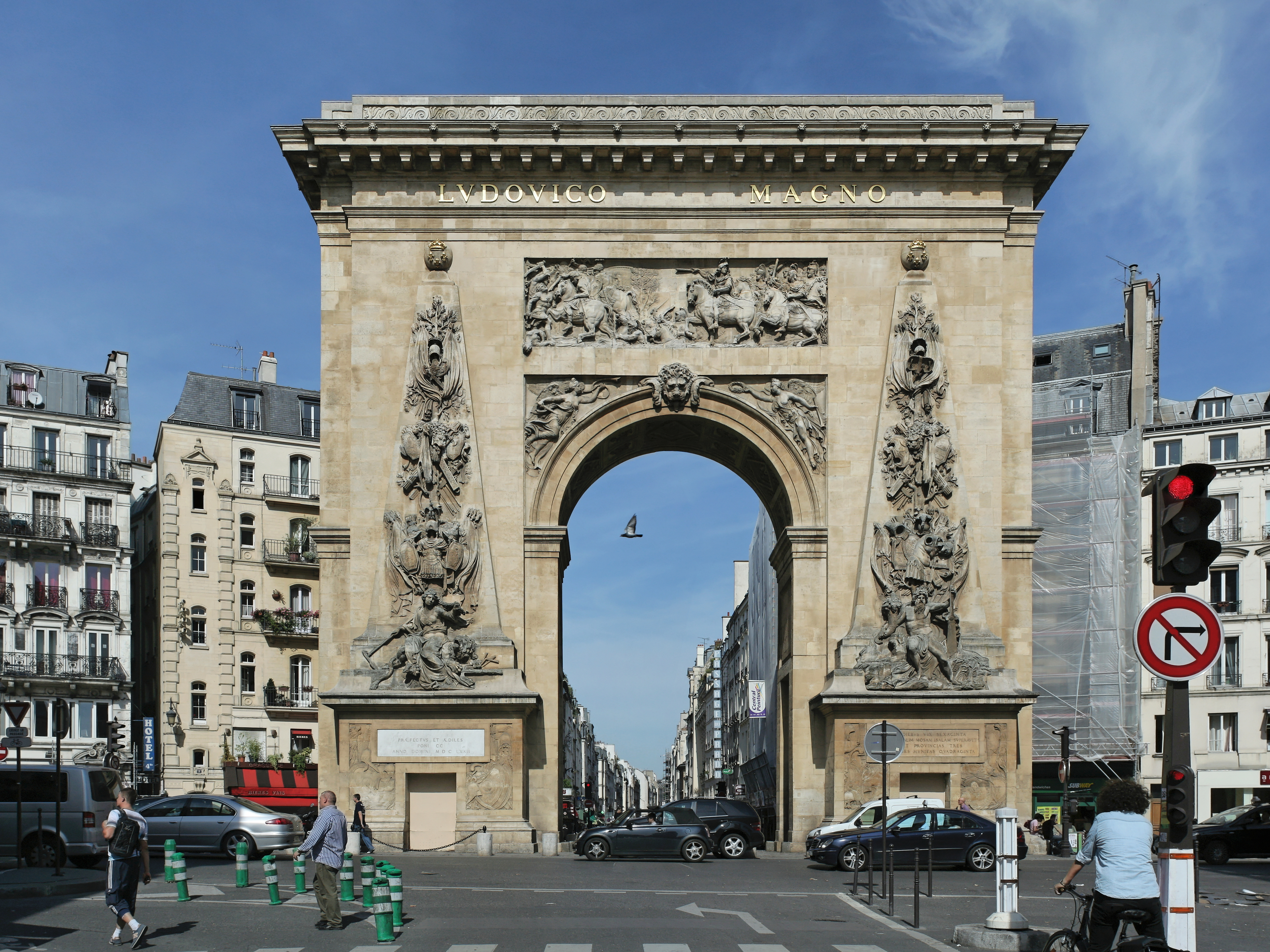
Porte Saint-Denis; sculpture by Michel Anguier

That same year he was commissioned with urbanization projects for the embellishment of Paris, notably the reconstruction of the Porte Saint-Denis and the Porte Saint-Bernard, and the plan for the city's expansion, which he accomplished with the collaboration of the architect Pierre Bullet.

On 31 December 1671, the King named Blondel Director and Professor of the Académie Royale d'Architecture.

In 1673, Blondel was appointed professor of mathematics to the Grand Dauphin; if the royal pupil was of mediocre talent, the project resulted in Blondel's Cours de Mathématiques (1683).

From 1670 until his death in 1686, Blondel was wholly occupied in professional matters and teaching. He collaborated on the dictionaries of Antoine Furetière, of Adrien Auzout for mathematics and Giovanni Alfonso Borelli for astronomy.
