= Émile Sagot =

French illustrator and lithographer

Émile Sagot (1805–1888) was a French illustrator and lithographer.

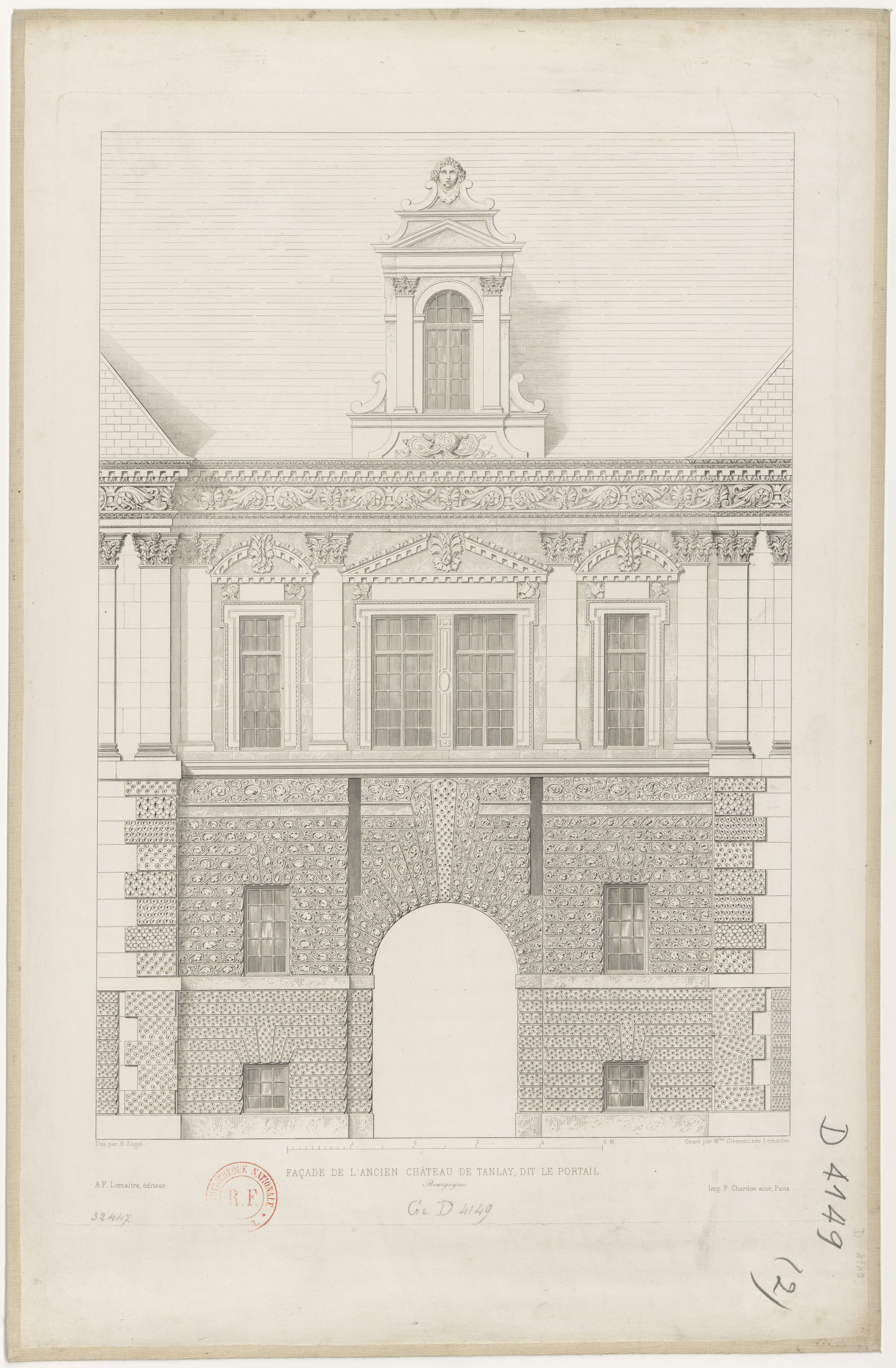
Château de Tanlay

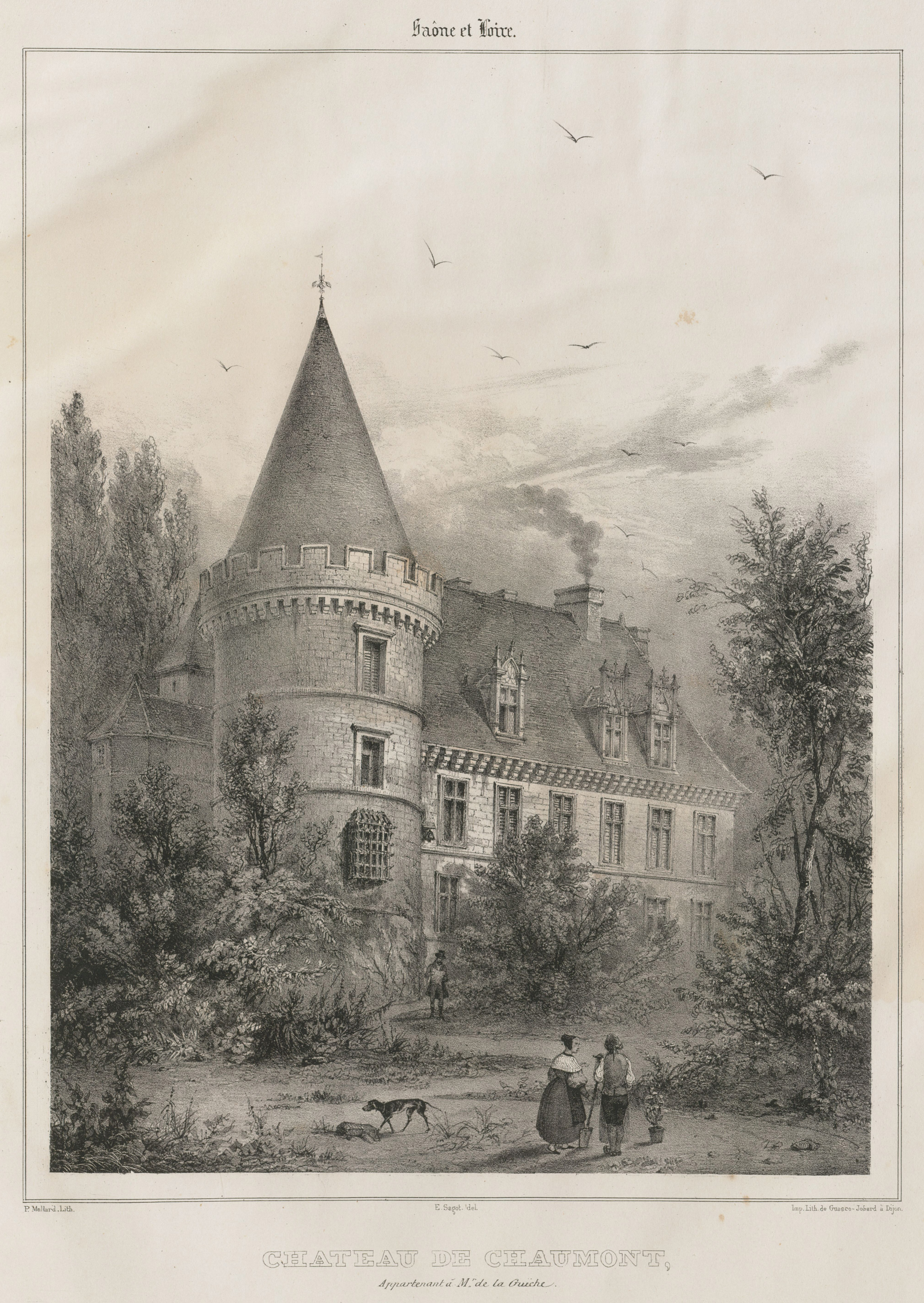
Château de Chaumont-la-Guiche

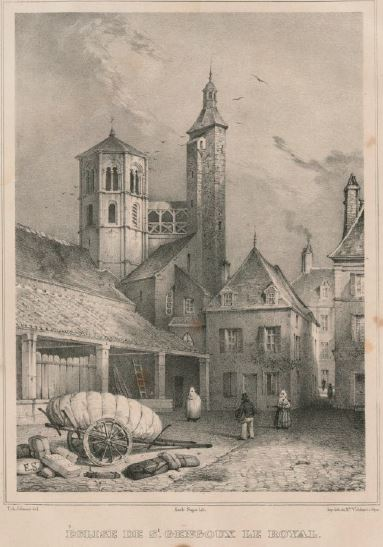
Saint-Gengoux-le-National
