= Gerard van Opstal =

Flemish sculptor

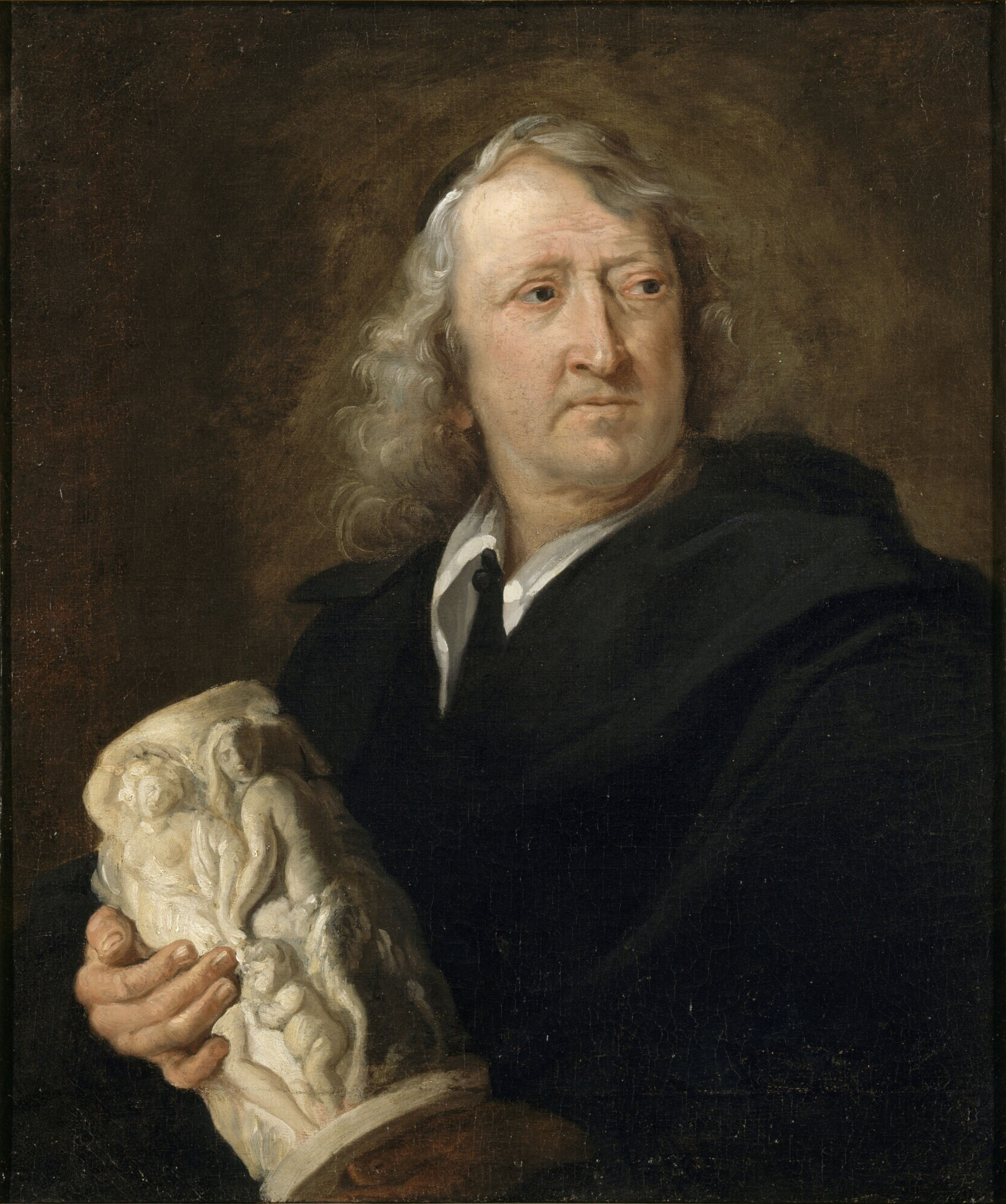
Portrait of Gerard van Opstal with ivory sculpture, by Lucas Franchoys the Younger, 1660s

Gerard van Opstal or Gérard van Opstal (1594 or 1597, Brussels – 1668, Paris), was a Flemish Baroque sculptor mainly active in Paris. He was known for his low-relief friezes with classical mythological themes and his expertise in carving ivory reliefs.

== Life ==
He was born in 1594 or 1597 in Brussels or Antwerp as the son of Anton van Opstal. He was trained around 1630 by Niklaas Diodone. He became master in the Antwerp Guild of St. Luke in 1635 and had a registered pupil there in 1641.

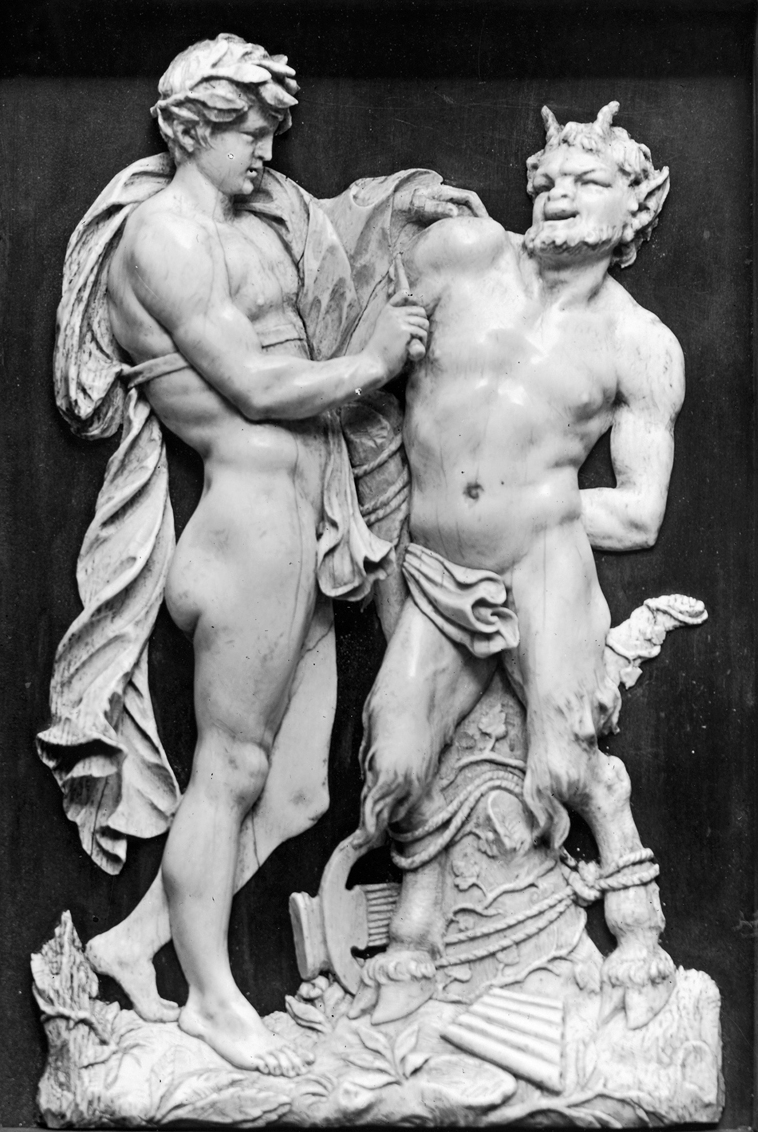
Apollo and Marsyas

He was a son-in-law of the Antwerp sculptor Johannes van Mildert. When his father-in-law died, he was contracted by the local city magistrates to complete the sculpture of Christ for the Calvary group on the Falconplein (Falcon square) in Antwerp. He moved to Paris before 1648, presumably at the explicit invitation of Cardinal Richelieu. Here he became one of the founders of France's Académie royale de peinture et de sculpture. Van Opstal was awarded the title 'sculpteur des batiments du roi' (Sculptor of the king's buildings) in 1651. Despite these distinctions, the artist complained that since Charles le Brun was against him he was unable to obtain any royal commissions.

He is particularly important for having brought a legal case in 1667 against the widow of a patron, Duchemin, intendant to Mademoiselle d'Orléans, for nonpayment of a commission dating from 1658. This case was based on the argument that sculpture was to be regarded as a liberal art rather than a craft and that therefore the rules regarding payments applicable to the liberal arts should be applied to the payments for sculptures.

In 1667 van Opstal delivered a conférence at the Académie royale on the Laocoön. In his presentation van Opstal argued that artists should go as far as possible in the study of the Laocoön both to understand the medical causes for the symptoms demonstrated by the bodies but also to learn how to represent violent movement of bodies in a dignified manner.

His son Louis van Opstal also became a sculptor.

== Work ==
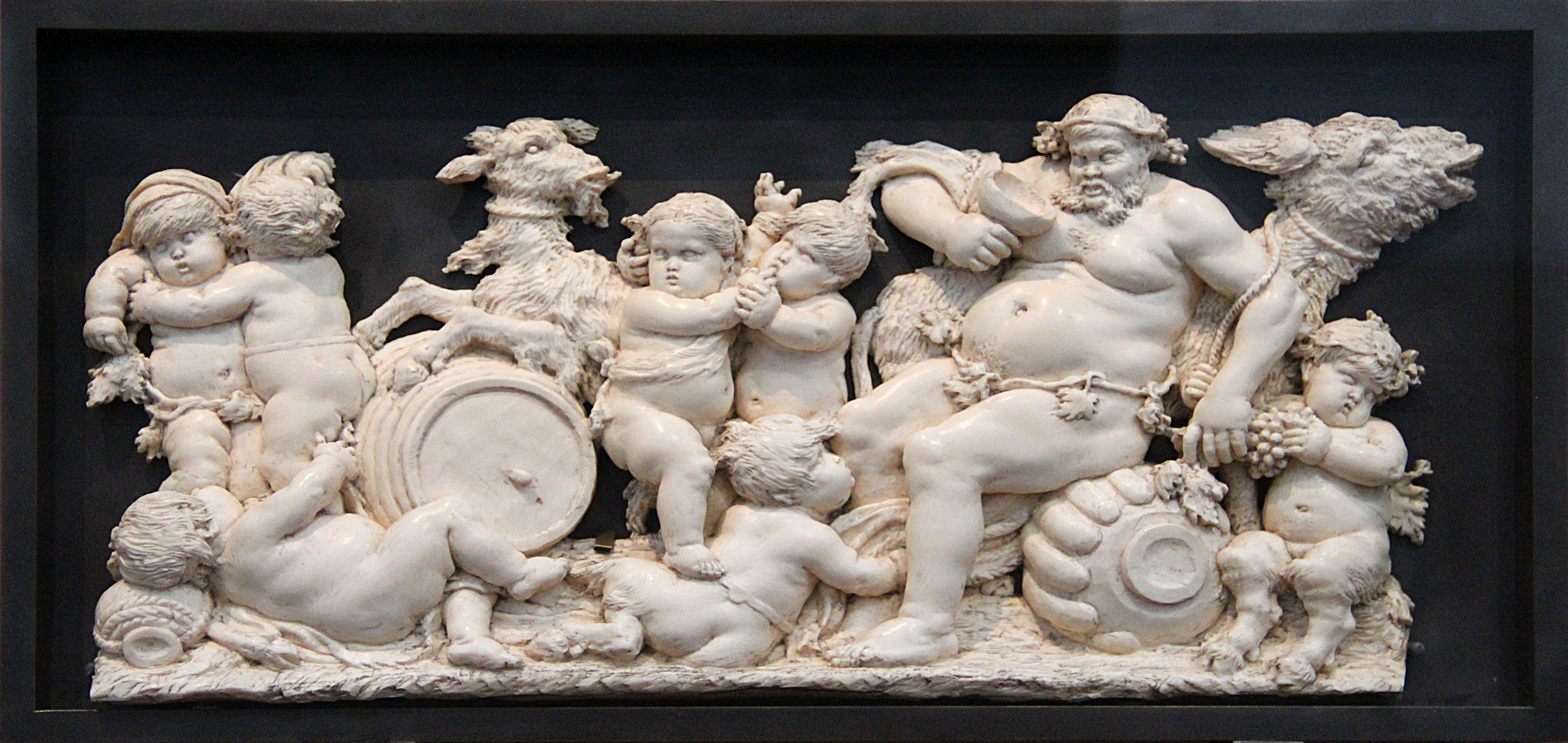
The drunkenness of Silenus

Van Opstal was particularly skilled in the carving of low-relief friezes with classical mythological themes. He worked not only in stone and marble, but was also an expert in carving ivory reliefs. His ivory reliefs were widely admired and collected by his contemporaries and 17 of them were in the collection of king Louis XIV. His style combined elements of Roman sarcophagi, the Renaissance, the Baroque style of Peter Paul Rubens and Francois Duquesnoy and the emerging French classical style.

He was known for his sculptures at the Porte Saint-Antoine in Paris, made in 1670 in honour of Louis XIV's 10th marriage anniversary. Gerard Van Opstal created three sculptures personifying France, Spain and Hymen, to be placed in niches. The gate was demolished in 1778.

The Louvre holds delicate ivory sculptures of Putto, made by his hand.
