= Porte Saint-Denis =

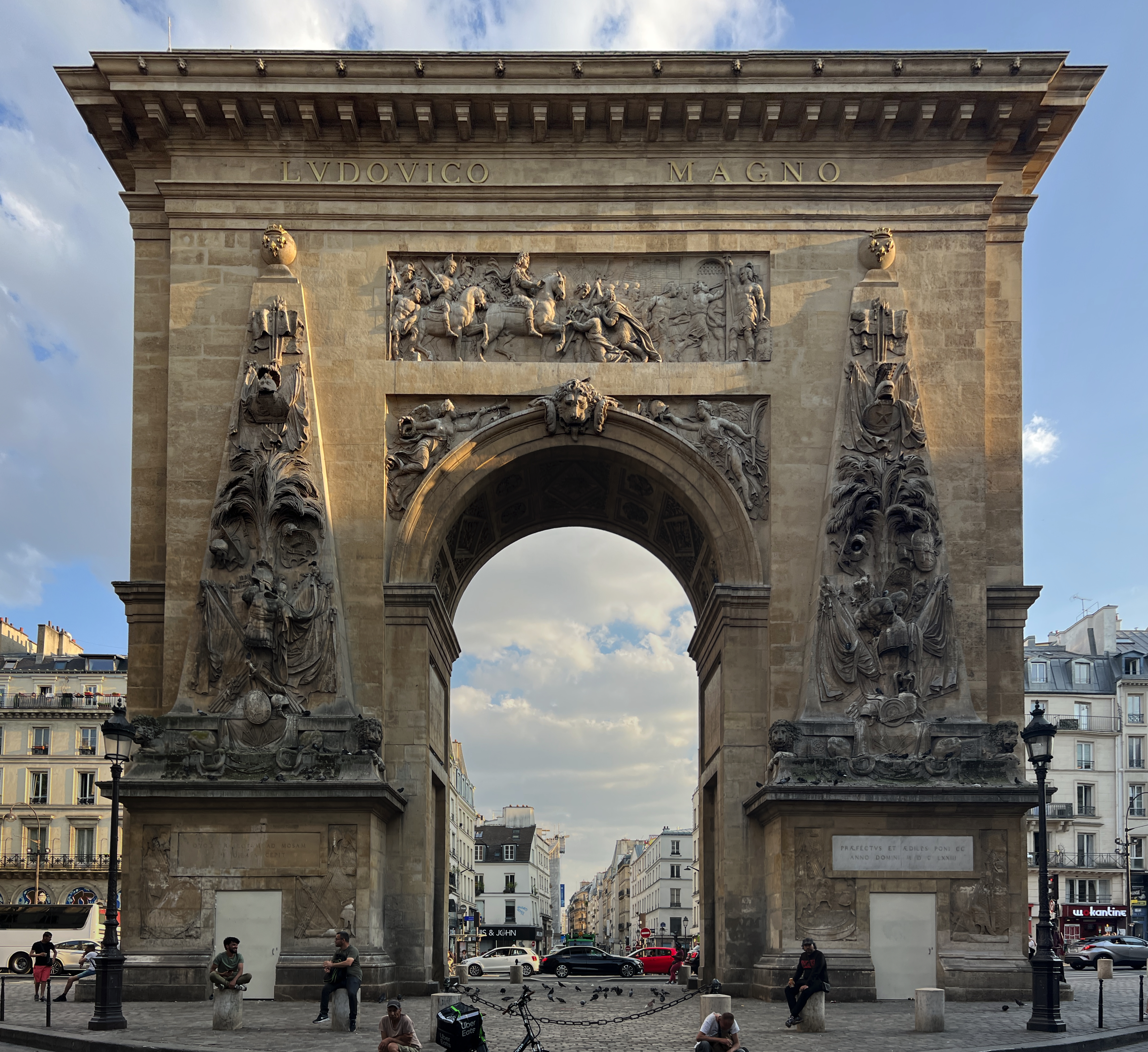
- Porte Saint-Denis (2023).

- Location within Paris

General information
- Type: Triumphal arch
- Location: 10th arrondissement, Paris, France
- Coordinates: 48°52′11″N 2°21′09.49″E
- Construction started: 1672

Design and construction
- Architect: François Blondel

The Porte Saint-Denis (French pronunciation: [pɔʁtə sɛ̃ dəni]; English: St. Denis Gate) is a Parisian monument located in the 10th arrondissement, at the site of one of the gates of the Wall of Charles V, one of Paris's former city walls. It is located at the crossing of the Rue Saint-Denis continued by the Rue du Faubourg Saint-Denis, with the Boulevard de Bonne-Nouvelle and the Boulevard Saint-Denis.

== History ==
=== 14th-century gate ===
The Porte Saint-Denis was originally a gateway through the Wall of Charles V that was built between 1356 and 1383 to protect the Right Bank of Paris. The medieval fortification had two gates and was surmounted with four towers. Additional portcullises defended the outer gate along with a drawbridge and rock-cut ditch. However, with the advent of gunpowder and the development of cannons and bombards, the walls were eventually partly torn down in the 1640s to make way for the larger and more fortified Louis XIII Wall. In the 1670s, the remaining walls of Charles V were entirely demolished when Paris spread beyond the confines of its medieval boundaries.

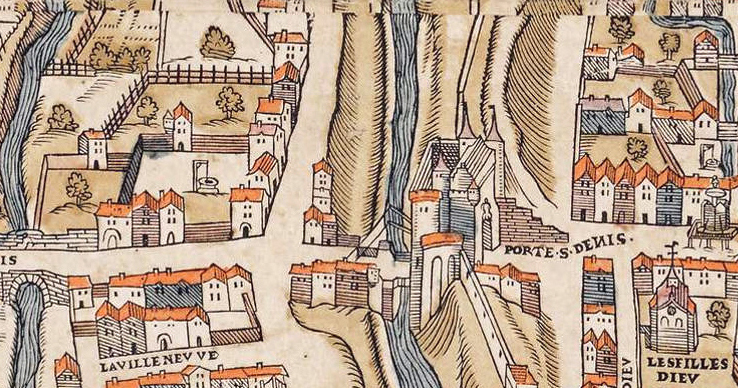
Porte Saint-Denis as depicted on the 1550 Paris map of Truschet and Hoyau

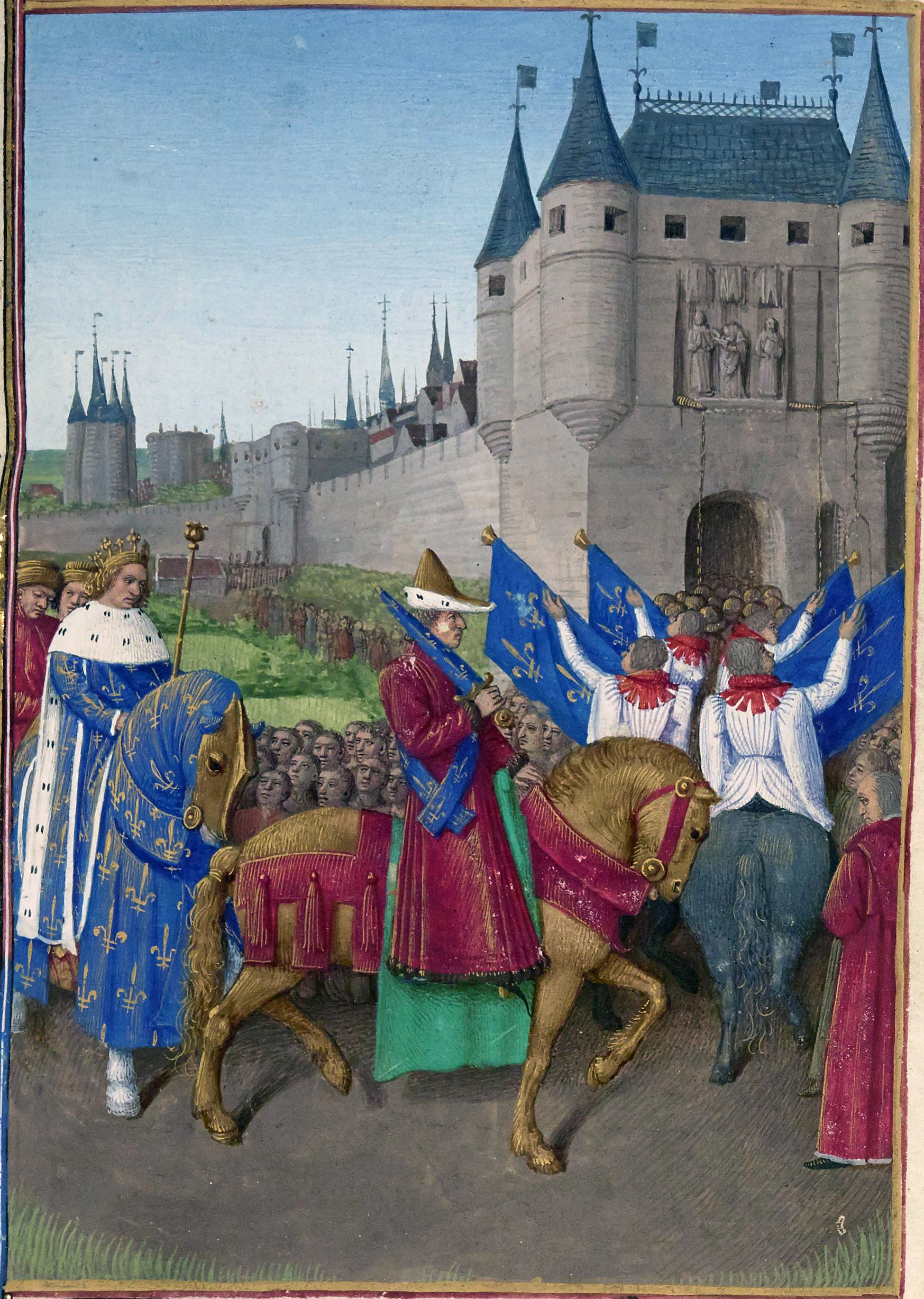
Entrance of Charles V of France into Paris via the old Porte Saint-Denis, miniature by Jean Fouquet, 1455–1460

=== 17th-century gate ===
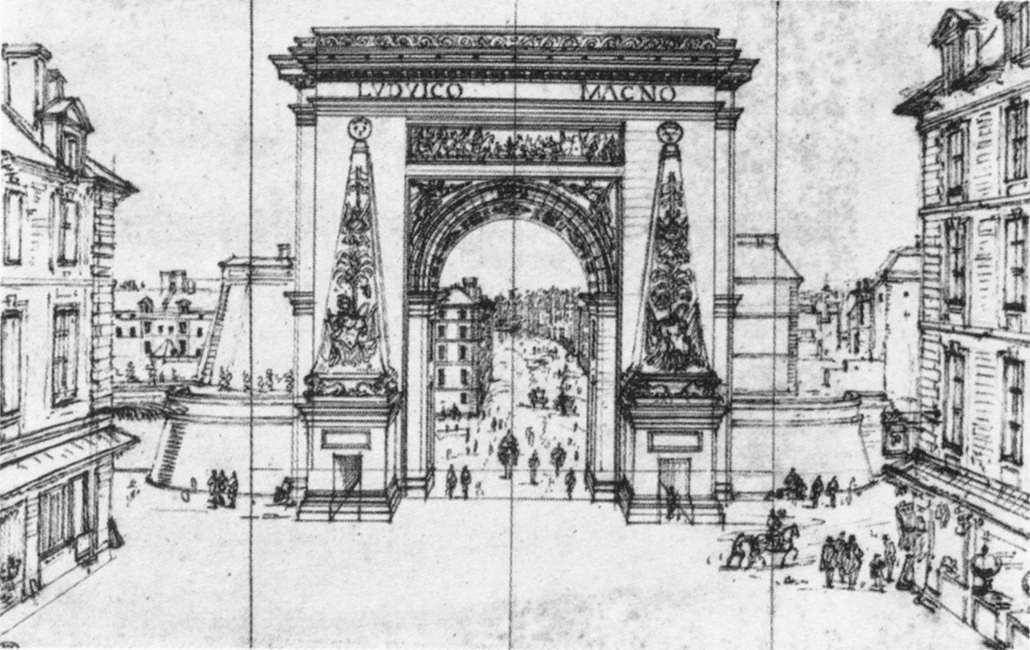
Porte Saint-Denis, pen and Indian ink. Etching by Gabriel Perelle, 1675. Musée du Louvre, Paris.

To replace the old gateway of the Porte Saint-Denis, Louis XIV commanded architect François Blondel and the sculptor Michel Anguier to build him a monumental archway that would honor the capture of Franche-Comté in 1668 and the victories on the Meuse and Rhine during the Franco-Dutch War. Work began in 1672 and was paid for by the city of Paris. The construction of the gate was carried out by Blondel's student Pierre Bullet.

A monument defining the official art of its epoque, the Porte Saint-Denis provided the subject of the engraved frontispiece to Blondel's influential Cours d'architecture, 1698. It was restored in 1988.

The Porte Saint-Denis was the first of four triumphal arches to be built in Paris. The three others are the Porte Saint-Martin (1674), the Arc de Triomphe du Carrousel (1806–1808), and the Arc de Triomphe (1836).

== Description ==
The Porte Saint-Denis is a triumphal arch inspired by the Arch of Titus in Rome. The monument is 24.65 m (80.9 ft) high, 25 m (82 ft) wide, and 5 m (16 ft) deep. The arch itself is 15.35 m (50.4 ft) high in the center and 8 m (26 ft) across.

The main arch is flanked by obelisks applied to the wall face bearing sculptural groups of trophies of arms. Above the main arch, the southern face carries a sculptural group by Michel Anguier of "The Passage of the Rhine" in a sunk panel, while the north face carries allegorical figures of the Rhine and the Netherlands. The entablature bears the gilded bronze inscription LUDOVICO MAGNO, "To Louis the Great". Two smaller pedestrian walkways were built through the obelisk pedestals but they have now been closed.

The Passage of the Rhine

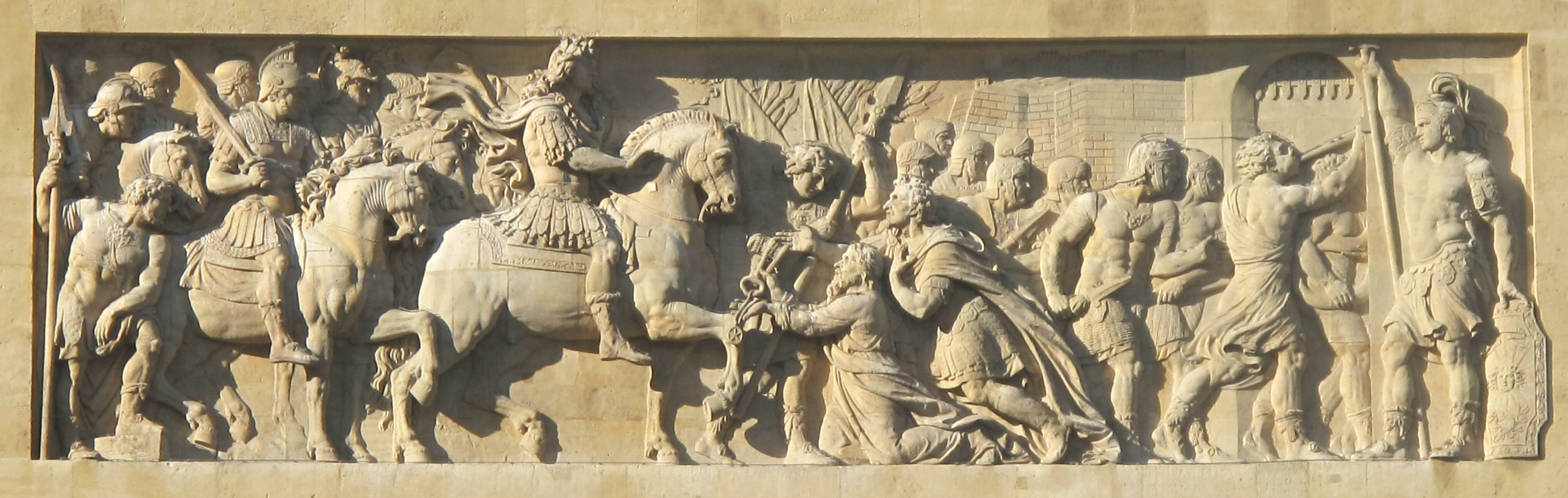
The Capture of Maastricht
Figure of Pheme (South façade, left spandrel)

Figure of Victoria (South façade, right spandrel)

Figure of Pheme (northern façade, left spandrel)

Figure of Victoria (northern façade, right spandrel)

== Gallery ==
The arch is decorated with a variety of sculptures and friezes

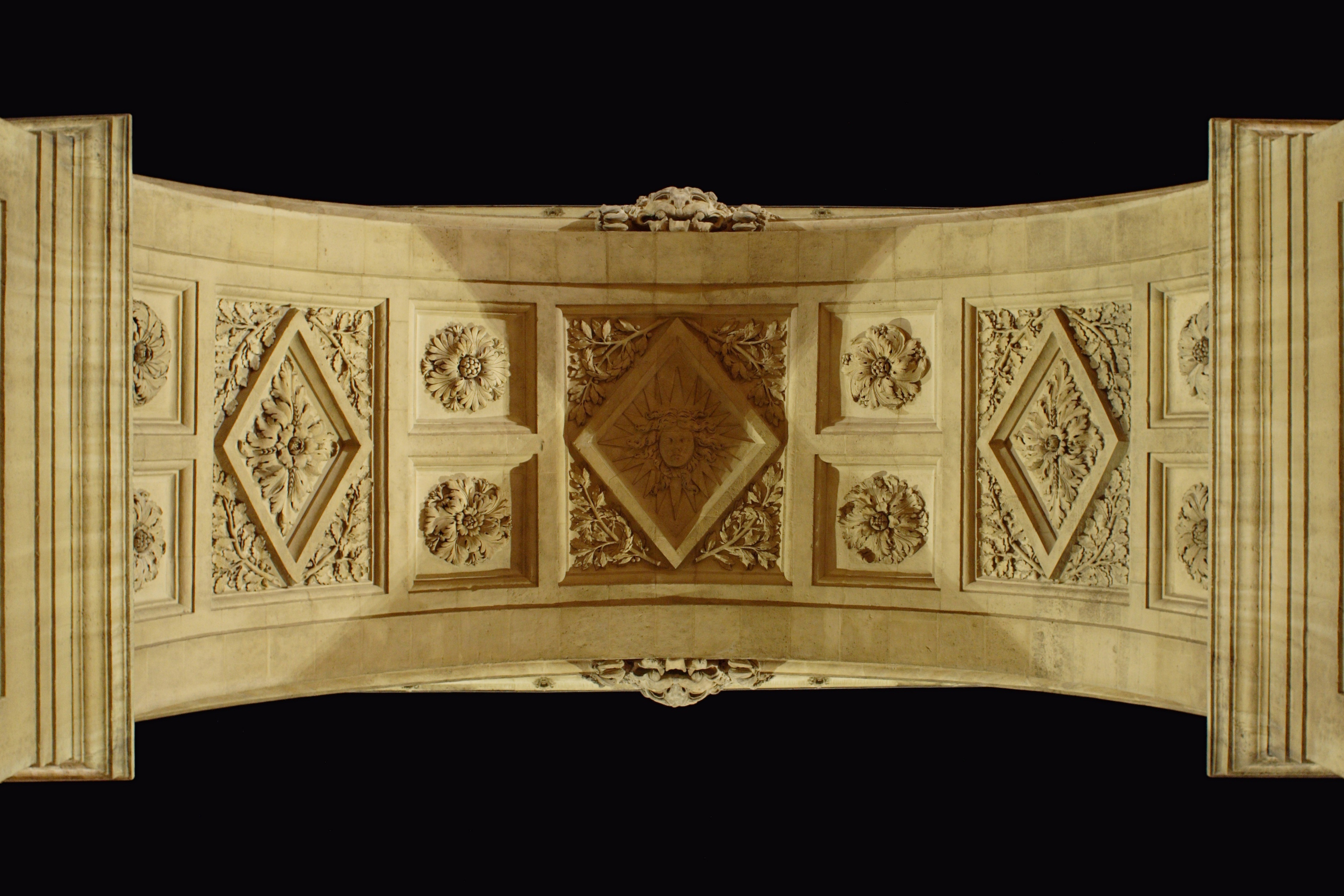
Intrados

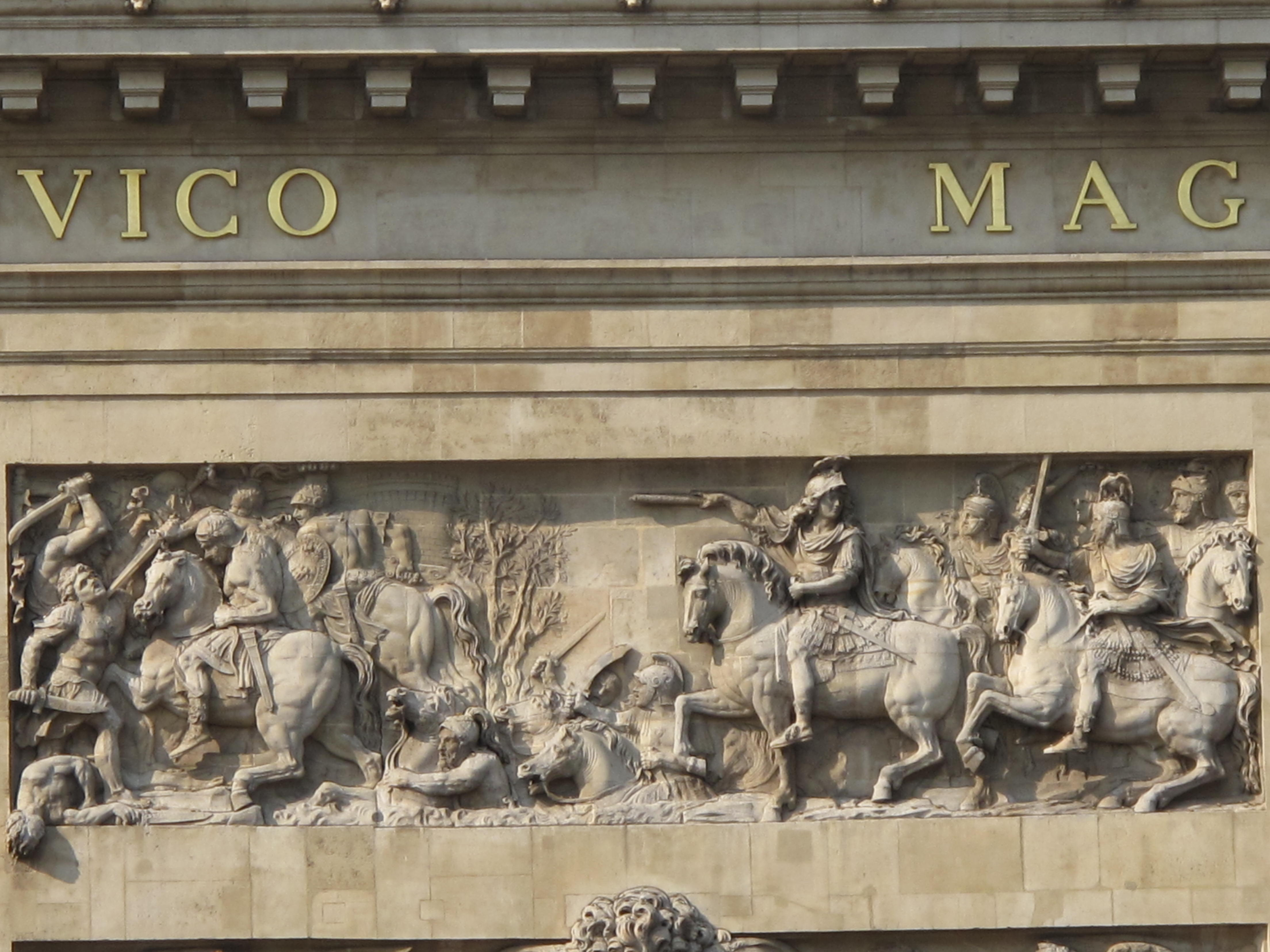
South face: passage of the Rhine

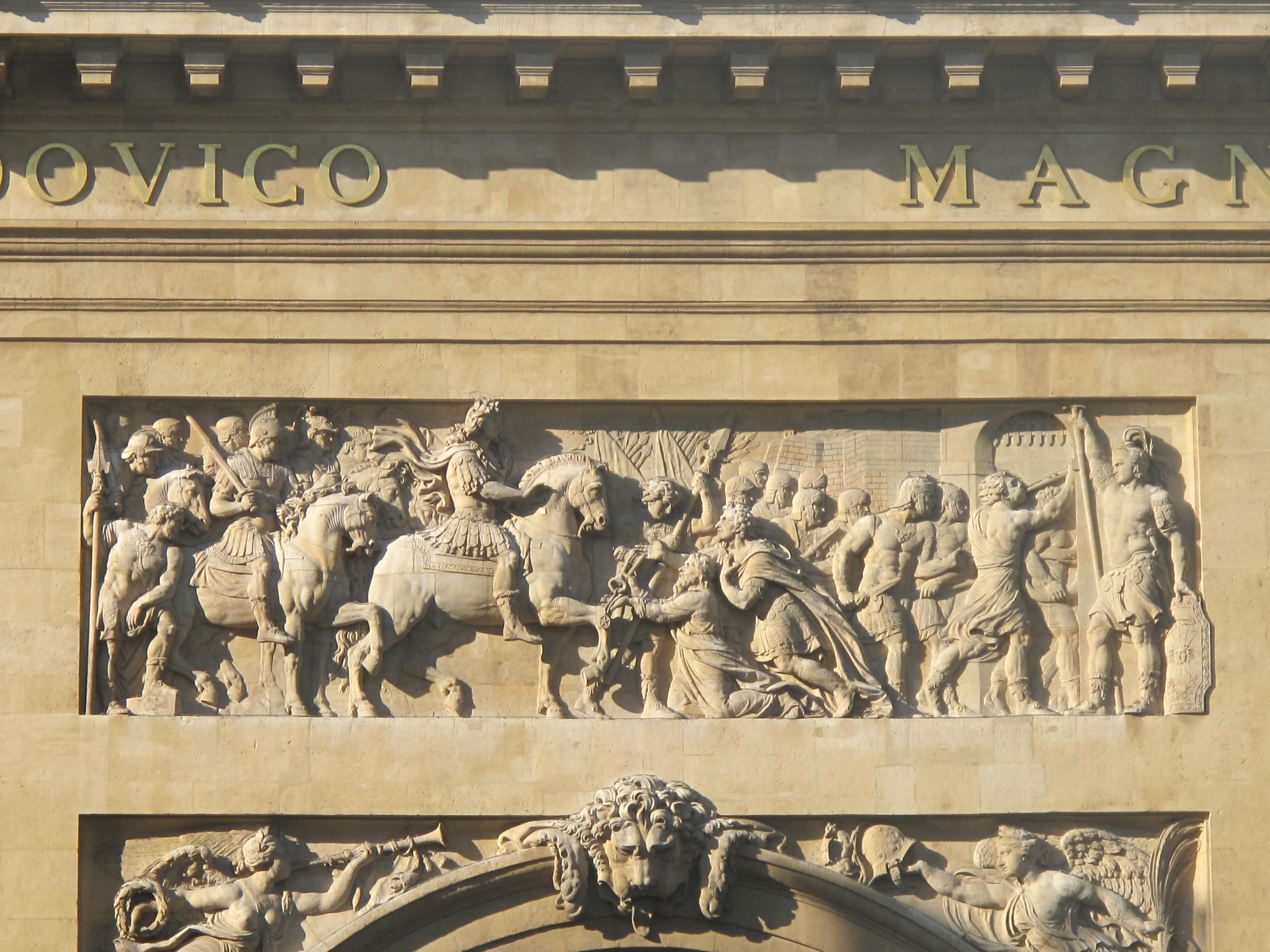
North face : capture of Maastricht

Departure of the Conscripts (1808) by Louis-Léopold Boilly with the Porte Saint-Denis on the right

== Access ==
Located near the Metro station: Strasbourg – Saint-Denis.

== See also ==
- List of post-Roman triumphal arches
