= Van Mildert =

Van Mildert may refer to:

== People ==
- Johannes van Mildert (1588–1638), Flemish sculptor
- William Van Mildert (1765–1836), English bishop

== Education ==
- Van Mildert College, Durham, a college of Durham University
- The Van Mildert Professor of Divinity at Durham University
