= Château de Tanlay =

Château in Burgundy, France

Coordinates: 47°50′57″N 4°5′7″E

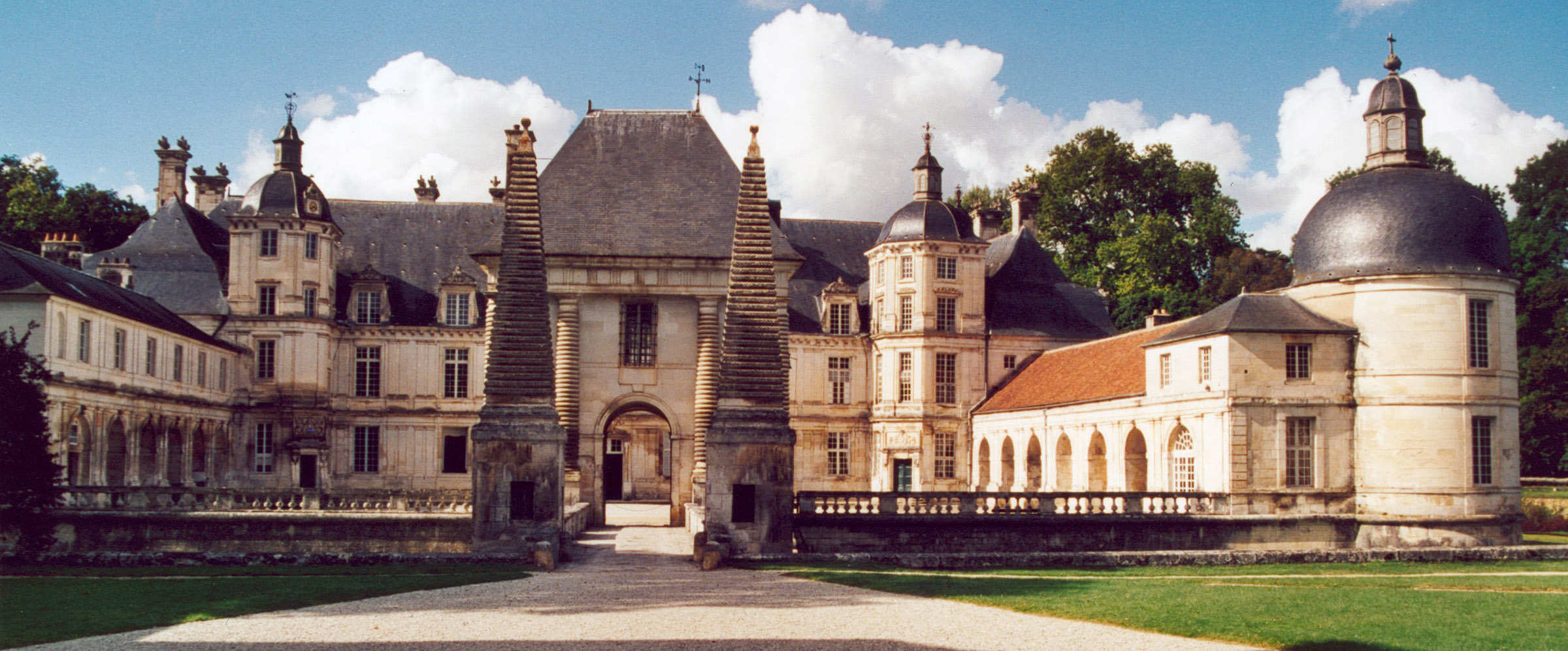
Château de Tanlay, Burgundy.

The Château de Tanlay at Tanlay (Yonne) is a French château built in Burgundy during the sixteenth and seventeenth centuries, famous for its beauty and the setting. The walls are of limestone under tall sloping slate roofs à la française, surrounding three sides of a central court with cylindrical towers at its four corners. The château is entirely encircled by its rectilinear moat and approached on axis across a bridge marked by paired obelisks through a gatehouse (illustration) built in 1558, which straddles the low balustrade and projects forward into the moat. The perfect symmetry of the cour d'honneur is part of Tanlay's serene charm.

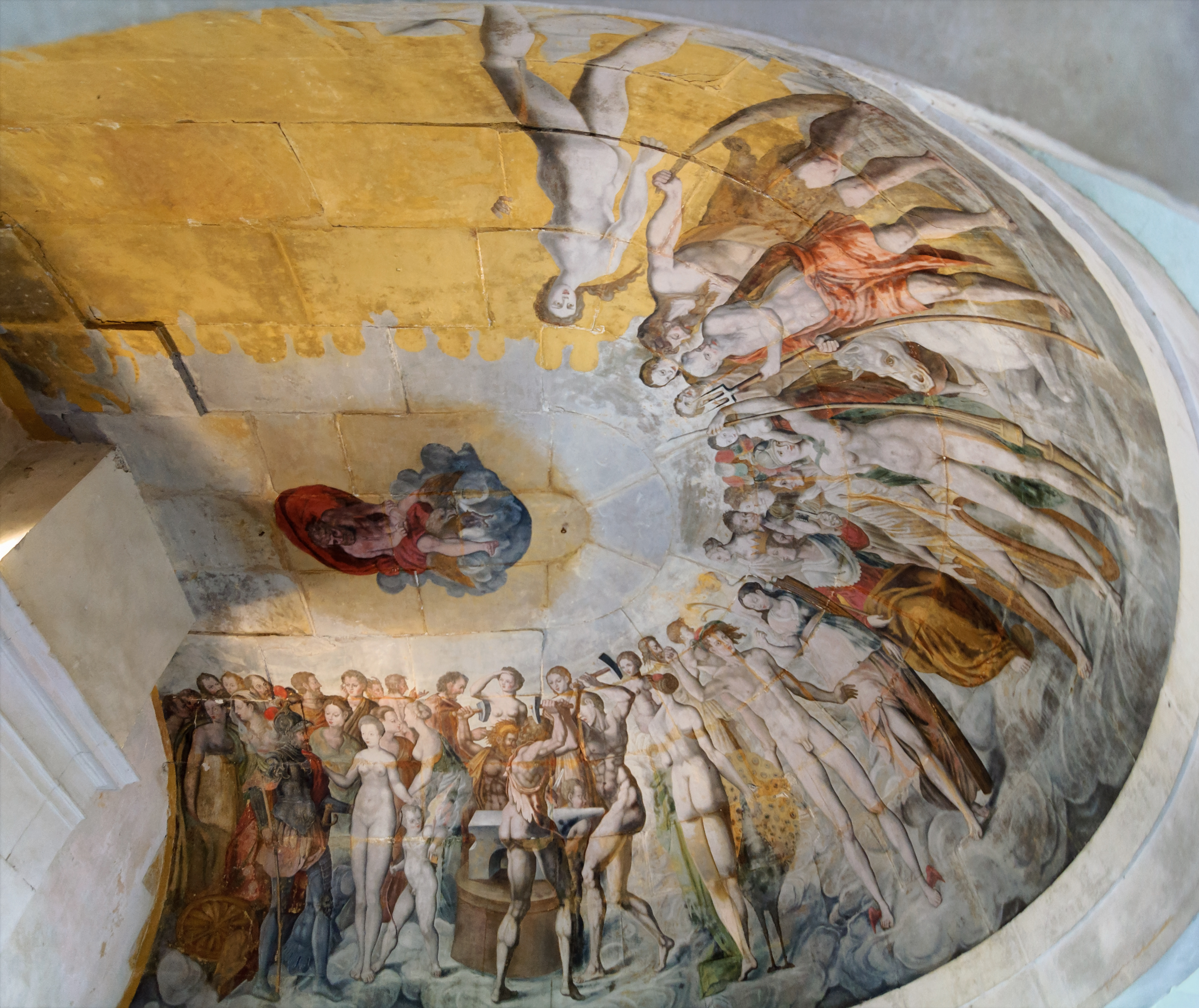
Frescoes in the Tour de la Ligue

The foundations are in part those of the thirteenth-century château-fort. The rebuilding in Renaissance style is owing to the brother of the Admiral de Coligny, François de Coligny d'Andelot (1521–1569), who inherited the site in ruinous condition in 1547 and whose construction campaigns of 1555-1568 during the Wars of Religion, when Tanlay was a center of Huguenot resistance, left the residence uncompleted. Building was recommenced afterwards by Michel Particeli d'Hemery, the surintendant de finance under Mazarin, who completed the château to designs by Pierre Le Muet between 1643 and 1649. Since 1700 the property has remained in the family of the man who was created marquis de Tanlay in 1705.

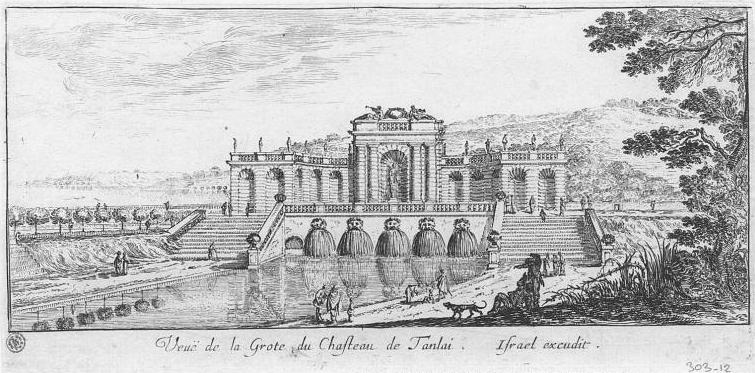
Le Muet's "Grotte" etched by Israel Silvestre not long after its completion

The house is also renowned for its gallery painted in trompe-l'œil and for the frescoes in the Tour de la Ligue ("Tower of the Huguenot League"), in which the antagonists of the War are represented in the guise of Olympic deities, and for its mellow stone and its remarkable canal, moats and grounds, which include a nymphaeum or théâtre d'eau by Pierre Le Muet.
