= François and Michel Anguier =

French sculptors

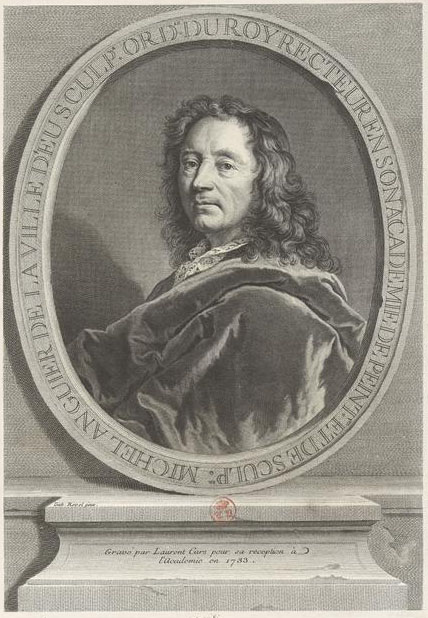
Michel Anguier, engraving by Laurent Cars

François (French pronunciation: [fʁɑ̃swa]; c. 1604–1669) and Michel Anguier (French pronunciation: [miʃɛl ɑ̃ɡje]; 1612–1686) were two French brothers and sculptors.

== Lives ==
They were natives of Eu in Normandy, and served their apprenticeship in the studio of Simon Guillain. François Anguier died in 1669. Michel Anguier died in Paris on 11 July 1686.

== Works ==
The chief works of François were the monument to Cardinal de Bérulle, the founder of the Carmelite order, which formerly occupied the chapel of the oratory at Paris, and the mausoleum of Henri II, the last duke of Montmorency, at Moulins. Of the monument to Cardinal de Bérulle, all but the bust have been destroyed.

Michel directed the decoration of the church of Val-de-Grâce from 1662 to 1667. A marble group of the Nativity in the church of Val-de-Grâce is reckoned his masterpiece. He was also credited with the sculptures of the triumphal arch at the Porte Saint-Denis (c. 1674), which served as a memorial of the conquests of Louis XIV, and he supervised the decoration of the apartments of Anne of Austria in the old Louvre. Nicolas Fouquet also employed him for his château, Vaux-le-Vicomte.

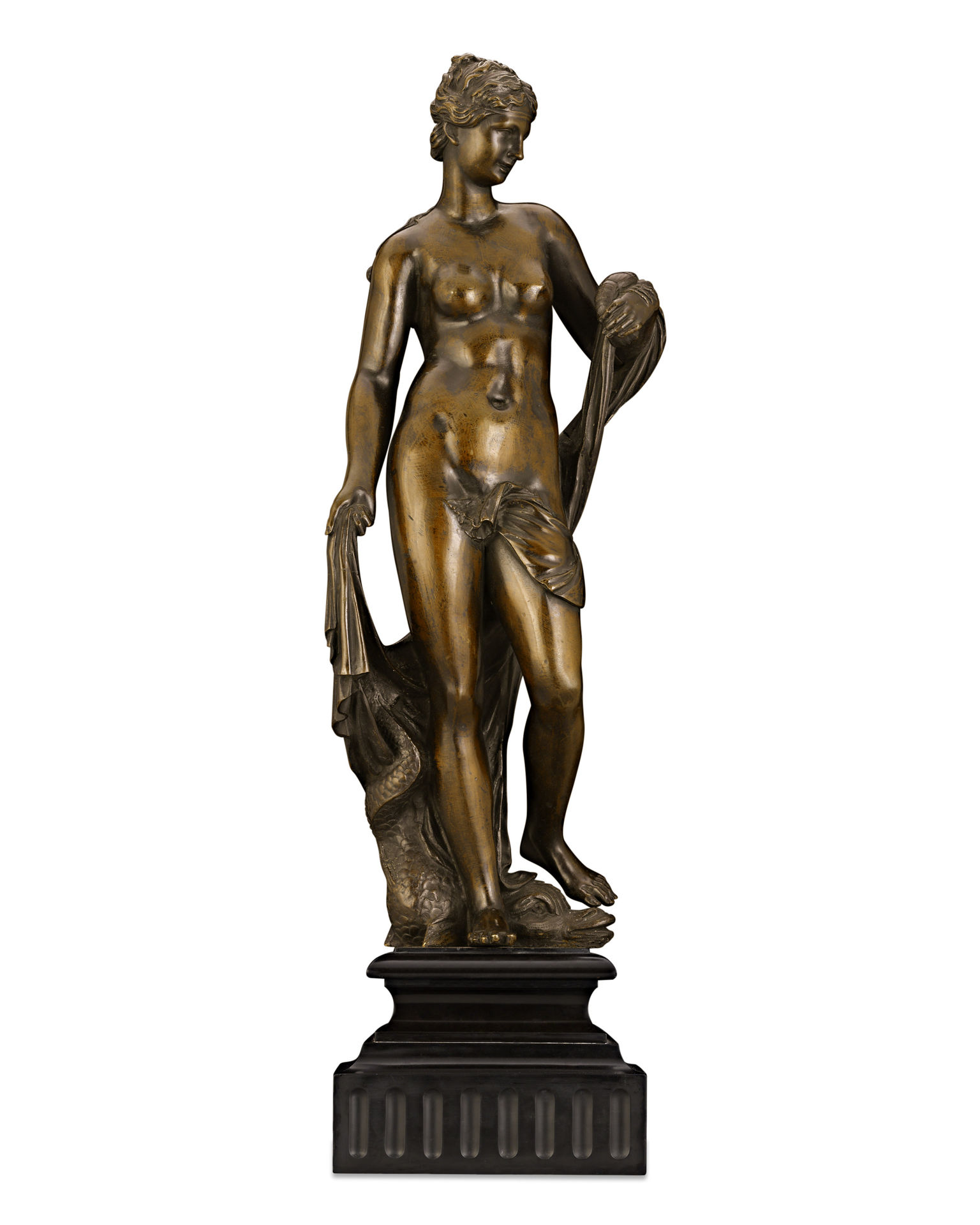
Amphitrite after Michel Anguier. Bronze. 17th century.
