= Saint-Bonnet-de-Joux =

- Commune
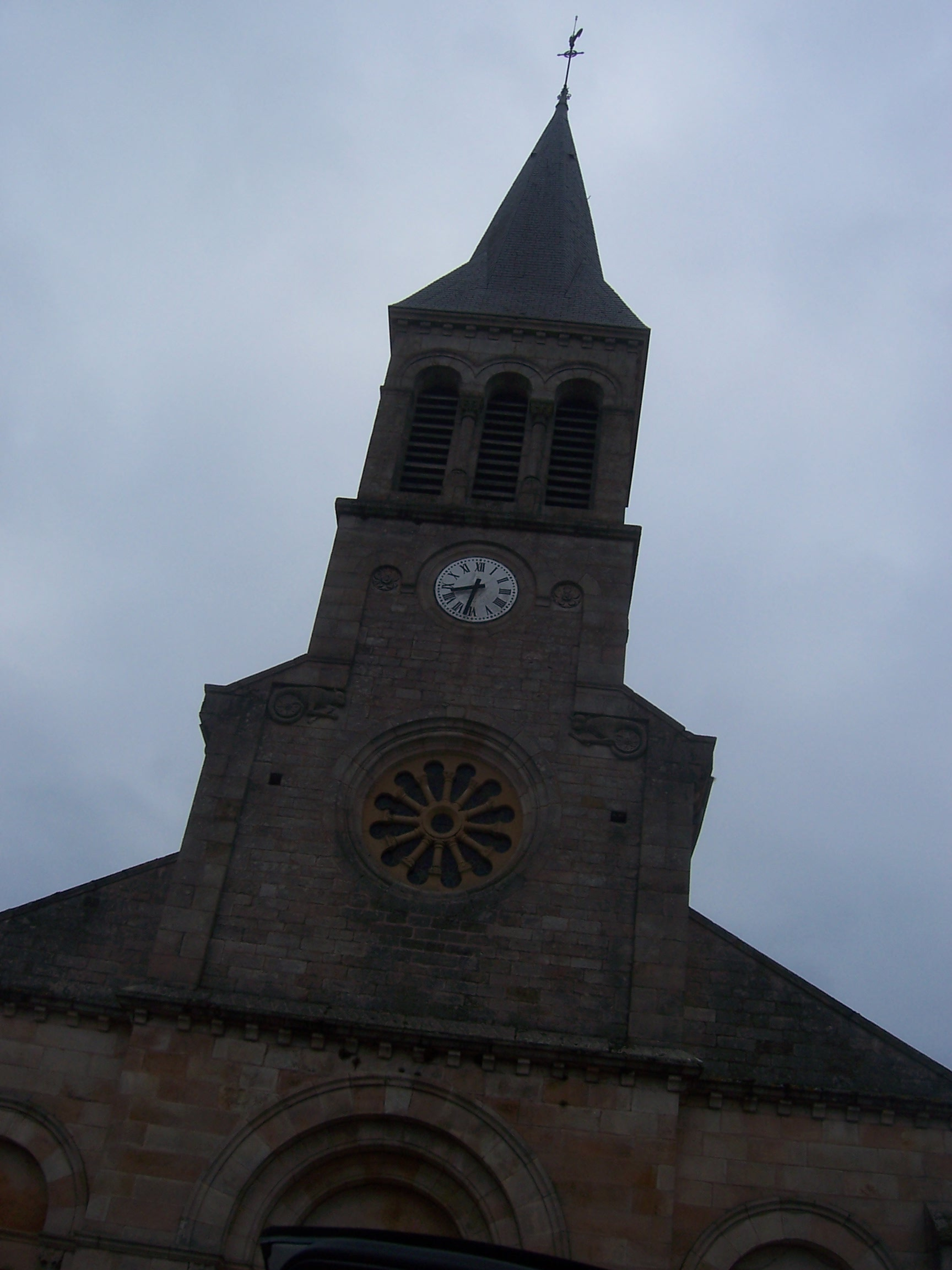
- The church in Saint-Bonnet-de-Joux
- Location of Saint-Bonnet-de-Joux
- Location within France Location within Bourgogne-Franche-Comté
- Coordinates: 46°29′00″N 4°26′25″E
- Country: France
- Region: Bourgogne-Franche-Comté
- Department: Saône-et-Loire
- Arrondissement: Charolles
- Canton: Charolles
- Area^{1}: 29.43 km^{2} (11.36 sq mi)
- Elevation: 394 m (1,293 ft)
- Highest elevation: 465 m (1,526 ft)
- Lowest elevation: 330 m (1,080 ft)
- Population (2023): 830
  - Density: 28/km^{2} (73/sq mi)
- Time zone: UTC+01:00 (CET)
  - Summer (DST): UTC+02:00 (CEST)
- INSEE/Postal code: 71394 /71220
- ^{1} French Land Register data, which excludes lakes, ponds, glaciers > 1 km^{2} (0.386 sq mi or 247 acres) and river estuaries.

Saint-Bonnet-de-Joux (French pronunciation: [sɛ̃ bɔnɛ də ʒu]) is a commune in the Saône-et-Loire department in the region of Bourgogne-Franche-Comté in central eastern France. In the Charolais natural region of Burgundy.

== See also ==
- Communes of the Saône-et-Loire department
