= Bibliography of Paris =

The following is a list of works about Paris, France:

== List of books, arranged by author ==
In English

- DeJean, Joan. How Paris Became Paris: The Invention of the Modern City (2014) ISBN 9781608195916
- Edwards, Henry Sutherland. Old and new Paris: its history, its people, and its places (2 vol 1894) online
- Fierro, Alfred. Historical Dictionary of Paris (1998) 392pp, an abridged translation of his Histoire et dictionnaire de Paris (1996), 1580pp
- Horne, Alistair. Seven Ages of Paris (2002), emphasis on ruling elites excerpt and text search
- Jones, Colin. Paris: Biography of a City (2004), 592pp; comprehensive history by a leading British scholar excerpt and text search
- Lawrence, Rachel; Gondrand, Fabienne (2010). Paris (City Guide) (12th ed.). London: Insight Guides. ISBN 9789812820792.
- Sutcliffe, Anthony. Paris: An Architectural History (1996) excerpt and text search

In French

- Brunet, Jean-Paul (1999). Police contre FLN, le drame d'octobre 1961 (in French). Flammarion. ISBN 978-2080676917.
- Combeau, Yvan [in French] (2013). Histoire de Paris (in French). Paris: Presses Universitaires de France. ISBN 978-2-13-060852-3.
- De Moncan, Patrice (2007). Les jardins du Baron Haussmann (in French). Paris: Les Éditions du Mécène. ISBN 978-2-907970-914.
- De Moncan, Patrice (2012). Le Paris d'Haussmann (in French). Paris: Les Editions du Mecene. ISBN 978-2-9079-70983.
- Dictionnaire Historique de Paris (in French). Le Livre de Poche. 2013. ISBN 978-2-253-13140-3.
- du Camp, Maxime (1993). Paris – Ses organes ses fonctions et sa vie jusqu'en 1870 [Paris – Its organs its functions and its life until 1870] (in French). Monaco: Rondeau.
- Einaudi, Jean-Luc (2001). La Bataille de Paris: 17 octobre 1961 (in French). Fayard. ISBN 2-213-61019-3.
- Fierro, Alfred (1996). Histoire et dictionnaire de Paris (in French). Robert Laffont. ISBN 2-221-07862-4.
- Héron de Villefosse, René (1959). Histoire de Paris (in French). Bernard Grasset.
- Jarrassé, Dominique (2007). Grammaire des jardins Parisiens. Parigramme. ISBN 978-2-84096-476-6.
- Maneglier, Hervé (1990). Paris Impérial- La vie quotidienne sous le Second Empire (in French). Paris: Armand Colin. ISBN 2-200-37226-4.
- Meunier, Florian (2014). Le Paris du moyen âge (in French). Paris: Editions Ouest-France. ISBN 978-2-7373-6217-0.
- Rougerie, Jacques (2014). La Commune de 1871. Paris: Presses universitaires de France. ISBN 978-2-13-062078-5.
- Sarmant, Thierry [in French] (2012). Histoire de Paris: Politique, urbanisme, civilisation (in French). Editions Jean-Paul Gisserot. ISBN 978-2-755-803303.
- Schmidt, Joel (2009). Lutece- Paris, des origines a Clovis (in French). Perrin. ISBN 978-2-262-03015-5.

== List of works, arranged chronologically ==
=== Published in the 17th–18th centuries ===
- "Paris", Topographia Galliae (in German), vol. 1, Frankfurt: Caspar Merian, 1655
- Joachim Christoph Nemeitz (1718). Séjour de Paris (in German). Frankfurt: Förster.
- Thomas Nugent (1749), "Paris", The Grand Tour, vol. 4: France, London: S. Birt, hdl:2027/mdp.39015030762580
- Richard Brookes (1786), "Paris", The General Gazetteer (6th ed.), London: J.F.C. Rivington

In French

- Nicolas de Blégny (1692). Le Livre commode des Adresses de Paris (in French). Paris P. Daffis. (see Nicolas de Blégny for information about this author)
- Germain Brice (1706), Description nouvelle de la vile de Paris (in French) (5th ed.), Paris: N. Le Gras, OL 24993162M
- Louis Liger (1715). Le voyageur fidèle, ou Le guide des étrangers dans la ville de Paris (in French). Paris: P. Ribou.
- Les Curiositez de Paris, de Versailles, de Marly, de Vincennes, de Saint Cloud, et des environs (in French). Claude-Marin Saugrain. 1742.
- Les Spectacles de Paris (in French), 1751–1797 (theatre almanac)
- Hébert (1761–1773). Almanach Parisien (in French).
- Hébert (1766). Dictionnaire Pittoresque et Historique de Paris (in French). Paris: Claude Herissant. v.2
- François Parfaict; Claude Parfaict (1767). Dictionnaire des théâtres de Paris (in French). Paris: Rozet.
- Pierre-Thomas-Nicolas Hurtaut (1779). Dictionnaire Historique de la Ville de Paris [Historical Dictionary of the City of Paris] (in French). Chez Moutard.
- Louis-Sébastien Mercier (1781–1788). Tableau de Paris (in French). (12 volumes)

=== Published in the 19th century ===
1800s-1850s

- Francis William Blagdon (1803). Paris as it was and as it is. Sketch of the French capital. London: C.and R. Baldwin.
- Abraham Rees (1819), "Paris", The Cyclopaedia, London: Longman, Hurst, Rees, Orme & Brown
- Jedidiah Morse; Richard C. Morse (1823), "Paris", A New Universal Gazetteer (4th ed.), New Haven: S. Converse
- "Paris", Cabinet Cyclopædia, vol. Cities and Principal Towns of the World, London: Longman, Rees, Orme, Brown, & Green, 1830, OCLC 2665202
- David Brewster, ed. (1832). "Paris". Edinburgh Encyclopædia. Philadelphia: Joseph and Edward Parker. hdl:2027/uc2.ark:/13960/t0gt5vw9n.
- History of Paris from the Earliest Period to the Present Day (2nd ed.). Paris: A. and W. Galignani. 1832.
- Mariana Starke (1839), "Paris", Travels in Europe (9th ed.), Paris: A. and W. Galignani
- Sinnett's Picture of Paris, London: Joseph Masters, 1845, OL 25125865M
- John Thomson (1845), "Paris", New Universal Gazetteer and Geographical Dictionary, London: H.G. Bohn
- Francis Coghlan (1853), Miniature Guide to Paris and its Environs, London: J. Onwhyn

1860s-1890s

- Charles Knight, ed. (1866). "Paris". English Cyclopaedia. Vol. 4, "Geography". London: Bradbury, Evans, & Co. hdl:2027/nyp.33433000064810.
- Adolphe Joanne (1867). Diamond Guide for the Stranger in Paris. Paris: Hachette.
- Arthur Mingeaud (1871), Condensed History of Paris, Quebec: Printed at "Morning Chronicle" Office
- Handbook for Visitors to Paris, London: John Murray, 1879, OL 24363358M
- Bradshaw's Illustrated Guide through Paris and its Environs, London: W.J. Adams and Sons, 1880, OCLC 19043482, OL 23282675M
- Cassell's Illustrated Guide to Paris. London: Cassell & Co. 1884.
- Albert Shaw (1891), "Paris, the Typical Modern City", The Century Magazine, vol. 42, New York
- Archibald Wilberforce, ed. (1893). "Paris". Capitals of the Globe. NY: Peter Fenelon Collier. hdl:2027/mdp.39015061863513.
- Norddeutscher Lloyd (1896), "Paris", Guide through Germany, Austria-Hungary, Italy, Switzerland, France, Belgium, Holland and England, Berlin: J. Reichmann & Cantor, OCLC 8395555

In French

- Jean-Baptiste Pujoulx (1801). Paris à la fin du XVIII. Siecle. (see Jean-Baptiste Pujoulx for information about this author)
- Ricard (1828). Véritable conducteur parisien (in French).
- Paris; ou, Le livre des cent-et-un [Paris; or, The book of the hundred-and-one] (in French). Paris: Ladvocat. 1831–1834. (15 volumes)
- Conseil Municipal (1866), Histoire générale de Paris (in French), OCLC 185294691
  - v.12, v.17, v.21
- Victor Hugo (1867), Paris-Guide (in French)

=== Published in the 20th century ===
1900s-1950s

- Frederic Harrison (1900). "Paris as an Historic City". The Meaning of History. Macmillan and Company.
- Katharine S. MacQuoid; Gilbert S. MacQuoid (1900), In Paris, Boston: L.C. Page & Company, OL 24343233M
- "Paris", Chambers's Encyclopaedia, London: W. & R. Chambers, 1901
- Elizabeth Otis Williams (1907), Sojourning, shopping & studying in Paris; a handbook particularly for women, Chicago, A. C. McClurg & co., OL 6984842M + Bibliography
- Nathaniel Newnham Davis (1911), "Paris", The Gourmet's Guide to Europe (3rd ed.), London: Grant Richards
- Mabell S.C. Smith (1913), Twenty Centuries of Paris, New York: Thomas Y. Crowell Company, OCLC 2619740, OL 13510933M
- Handbook to Paris and its Environs (11th ed.), London: Ward, Lock and Co., 1921, OL 14010841M

1960s-1990s

- Walter Benjamin (1982). Das Passagen-Werk [Arcades Project] (in German). Suhrkamp. ISBN 3518112007.
- Donald Olsen (1986). The City as a Work of Art: London, Paris, Vienna. Yale University Press. ISBN 9780300042122.
- Flanner, Janet. Paris Was Yesterday, 1925-1939 (1988); Primary source; her "Letter from Paris," in New Yorker magazine
- François Loyer, Paris, Nineteenth Century: Architecture and Urbanism, trans. Charles Lynn Clark (New York, 1988)
- Vincent Cronin (1989). Paris on the Eve, 1900-1914. New York: HarperCollins. ISBN 0-312-04876-9.
- Wiser, William. The Crazy Years: Paris in the Twenties (1990); focus on artists & celebrities, especially expatriates
- Annick Pardailhe-Galabrun, The Birth of Intimacy: Privacy and Domestic Life in Early Modern Paris, trans. Jocelyn Phelps (Cambridge, 1991).
- Christopher Prendergast, Writing the City: Paris and the Nineteenth Century (Oxford, 1992),
- Bernier, Olivier. Fireworks at Dusk: Paris in the Thirties (1993); social, artistic, and political life
- Priscilla Parkhurst Ferguson. Paris as Revolution: Writing the Nineteenth-Century City (Berkeley, 1994)
- Christiansen, Rupert. Tales of the New Babylon: Paris, 1869-75 (Sinclair-Stevenson, 1994)
- Vincent Cronin (1994). Paris:City of Light, 1919-1939. New York: HarperCollins. ISBN 0-00-215191-X.
- Jean Favier (1997-04-23). Paris (in French). Fayard. ISBN 2-213-59874-6.
- Historical Dictionary of Paris. Landham, Maryland: Scarecrow Press, 1998.
- Sharon Marcus, Apartment Stories: City and Home in Nineteenth-Century Paris and London (Berkeley, 1999)

=== Published in the 21st century ===
- Wiser, William. The twilight years: Paris in the 1930s (Robson Books, 2000); Focus on artists & celebrities, especially expatriates
- Mansel, Philip. Paris Between Empires 1814-1852 (John Murray, 2001)
- Harvey, David. Paris, Capital of Modernity (Routledge, 2003)
- D.C. Woodcox (2003). "Paris". In Jennifer Speake (ed.). Literature of Travel and Exploration: An Encyclopedia. Taylor & Francis. pp. 920–924. ISBN 978-1-57958-424-5.
- Colin Jones (2004). Paris: The Biography of a City. New York: Penguin Viking. ISBN 0-670-03393-6.
- David Levinson, ed. (2004). "Paris". Encyclopedia of Homelessness. Sage Publications. pp. 441–445. ISBN 978-0-7619-2751-8.
- Simone Roux (2009). Paris in the Middle Ages. University of Pennsylvania Press. ISBN 978-0-8122-4159-4.
- Rosemary Wakeman (2009). The Heroic City: Paris, 1945-1958. University of Chicago Press. ISBN 978-0-226-87023-6. online review
- Mitchell, Allan. Nazi Paris: The History of an Occupation, 1940-1944 (2010)
- Rearick, Charles. Paris Dreams, Paris Memories: The City and Its Mystique (Stanford University Press, 2011). 296 pp. online review
- Graham Robb (2011). Parisians: An Adventure History of Paris. W. W. Norton. ISBN 978-0-393-07928-9.
- Winter, Jay and Jean-Louis Robert, eds. Capital Cities at War: Volume 2, A Cultural History: Paris, London, Berlin 1914-1919 (2 vol 2012)
- Charles Emmerson (2013). "Paris". 1913: In Search of the World Before the Great War. Public Affairs. ISBN 978-1-61039-257-0.
- Castigliano, Federico (2017). Flâneur. The Art of Wandering the Streets of Paris. ISBN 978-1546942092
- Christiansen, Rupert. City of Light: The Reinvention of Paris (Head of Zeus, 2018)
- Ford, Caroline. "The Sound of Paris: An Environmental History of Noise in the City of Light" Environment and History (2025) v.31#1 pp. 1–21 online

== Bibliographies ==
- A. Girault de Saint-Fargeau [in French] (1847). Bibliographié historique et topographique de la ville de Paris [Historical and Topographical Bibliography of the City of Paris] (in French).
- Valentin Dufour (1882). Bibliographie artistique, historique et litteraire de Paris avant 1789 (in French). Paris: A. Laporte. + Index
- Robert C. Brooks (1901), "Paris", Bibliography of Municipal Problems and City Conditions, Municipal Affairs, vol. 5 (2nd ed.), New York: Reform Club, OCLC 1855351

== See also ==
- Category:Books about Paris
- Category:Documentary films about Paris
- Category:Music about Paris
