= Silvia Balletti =

Italian actress (1701–1758)

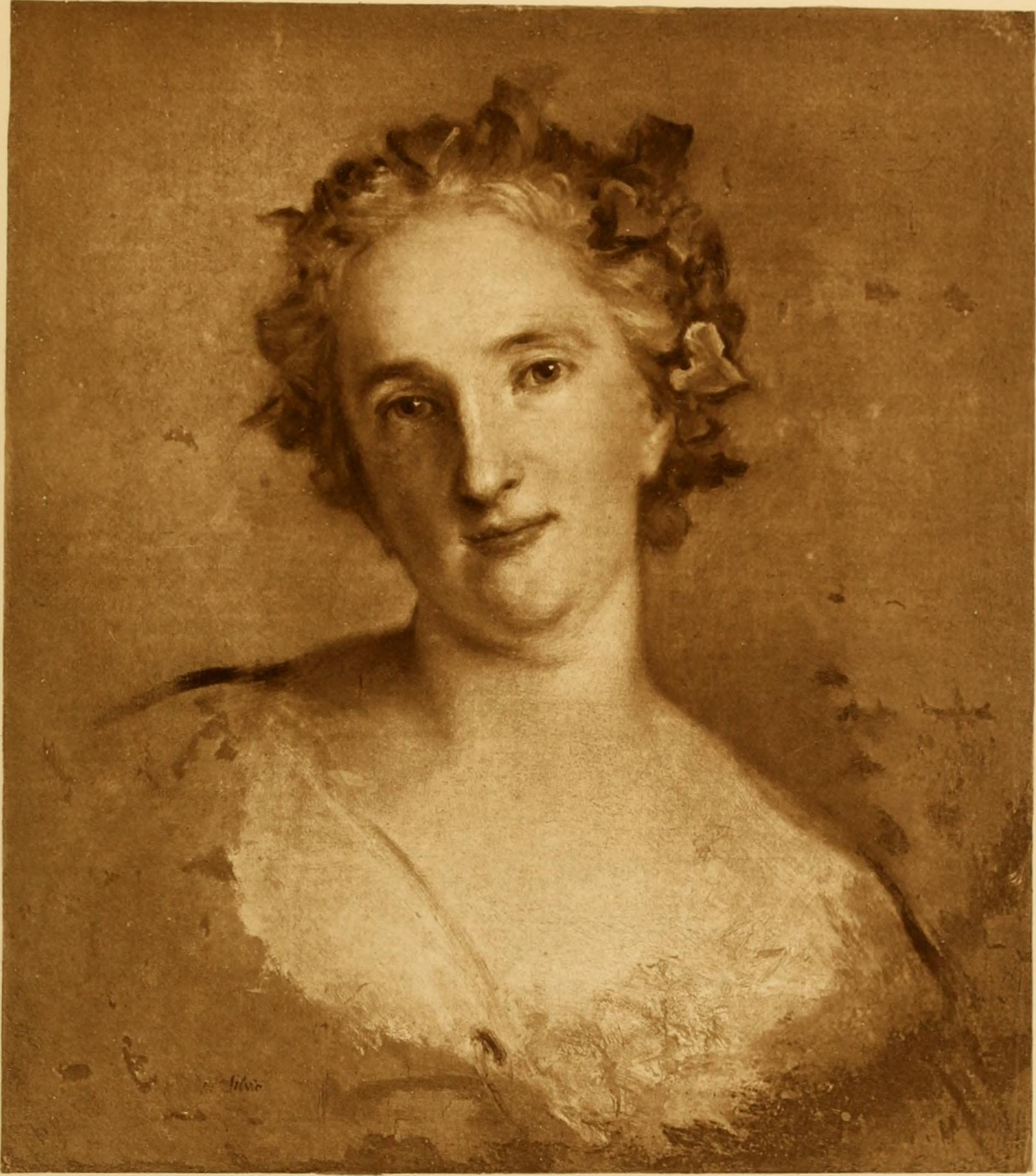
Portrait of Silvia Balletti by Jean-Marc Nattier

Silvia Balletti (born Zanetta Rosa Benozzi; 27 June 1701 in Toulouse, Languedoc – 16 September 1758 in Paris), known under her stage name Silvia, was an actress who was the daughter of actors from the Republic of Venice but lived her whole life in France. She was active in the Troupe de Regente of Luigi Riccoboni at the Comédie-Italienne in Paris, 1716–1758. She became the star of the Italian theatre in Paris and was regarded as a superior interpreter of the plays by Pierre de Marivaux. She mainly played the part of heroine in Commedia dell'arte, Silvia. Casanova belonged to her admirers.

== Life ==
Silvia Balletti was born to the Italian actors Antonio Benozzi and Clara Mascara, who belonged to a Venetian theatre company active in Toulouse since the banishment of the Comédie Italienne from Paris in 1697. In 1716, she belonged to the first actors engaged when the Comédie Italienne was reestablished in Paris. Her career up to that point is not known, but it is presumed that she must have had experience, since she would not otherwise have been hired to take part in the opening performance before the regent of 18 May 1716. She made a success, and became the theatre's star in heroine parts.

In 1720, she began a long co-operation with Pierre de Marivaux, who wrote numerous plays for her in which she celebrated triumphs on stage. Among her celebrated parts were the main parts in Le Jeu de l'amour et du hasard (1730), L'amante difficile (1731), Le Je ne sais quoi (1731), L'École des mères (1732), Arlequin apprenti philosophe (1733). Until his death in 1739, she mainly acted opposite Tommaso Visentini, thereafter opposite Antonio Costantini. Though she eventually replaced the parts as heroine for mother-roles, she remained one of the most celebrated actors of Paris until her retirement, and was in 1754 still referred to as a renowned perfect actor. Silvia Balletti retired in February 1758, shortly before her death.

In 1720, she married her cousin Giuseppe (Joseph) Balletti, stage name Mario, who was her co-actor in hero parts. In 1750, she met Casanova, who was the friend of her son Antonio Stefano Balletti and courted her daughter Manon.

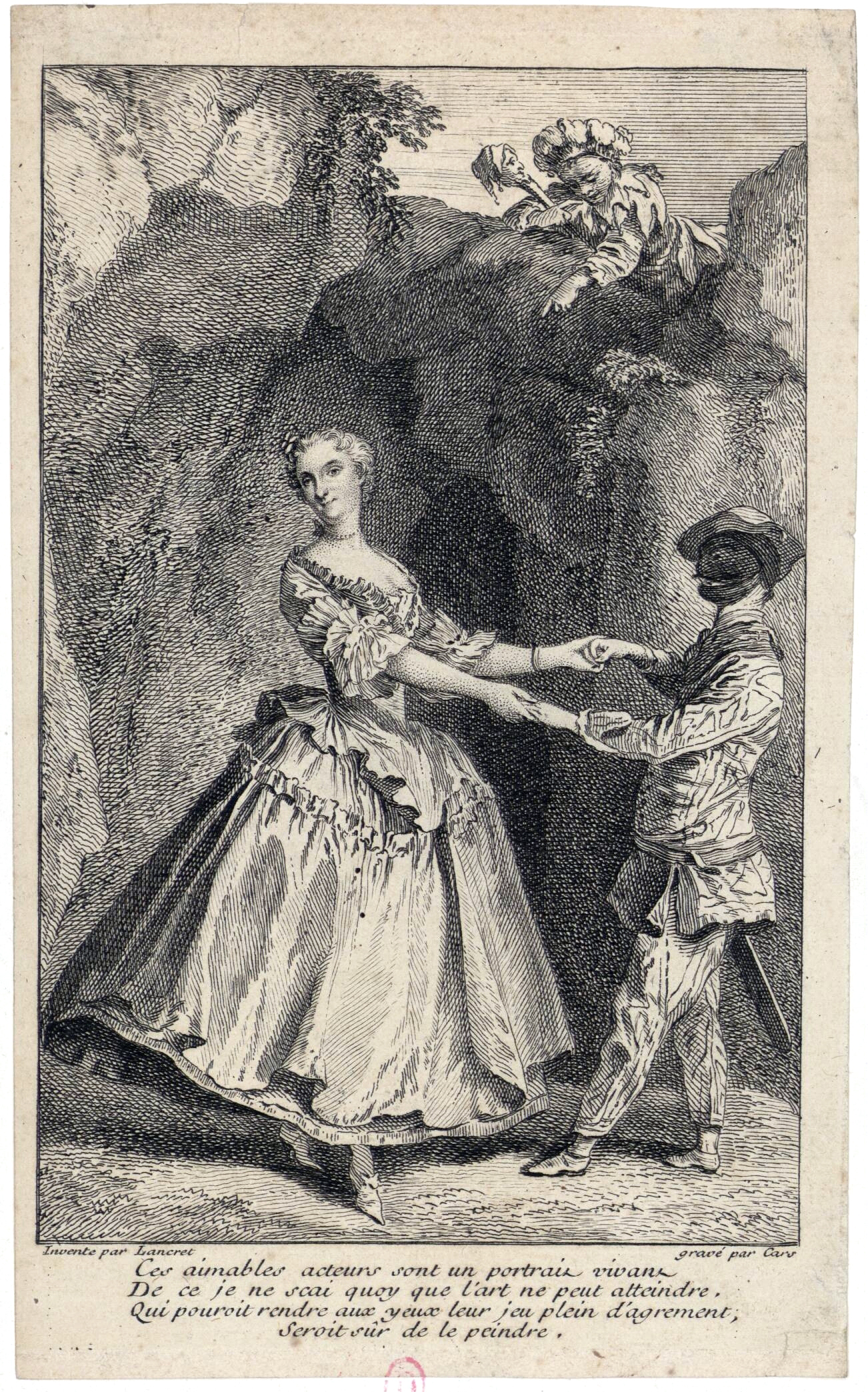
Silvia with Tommaso Visentini, engraving by Laurent Cars after Nicolas Lancret

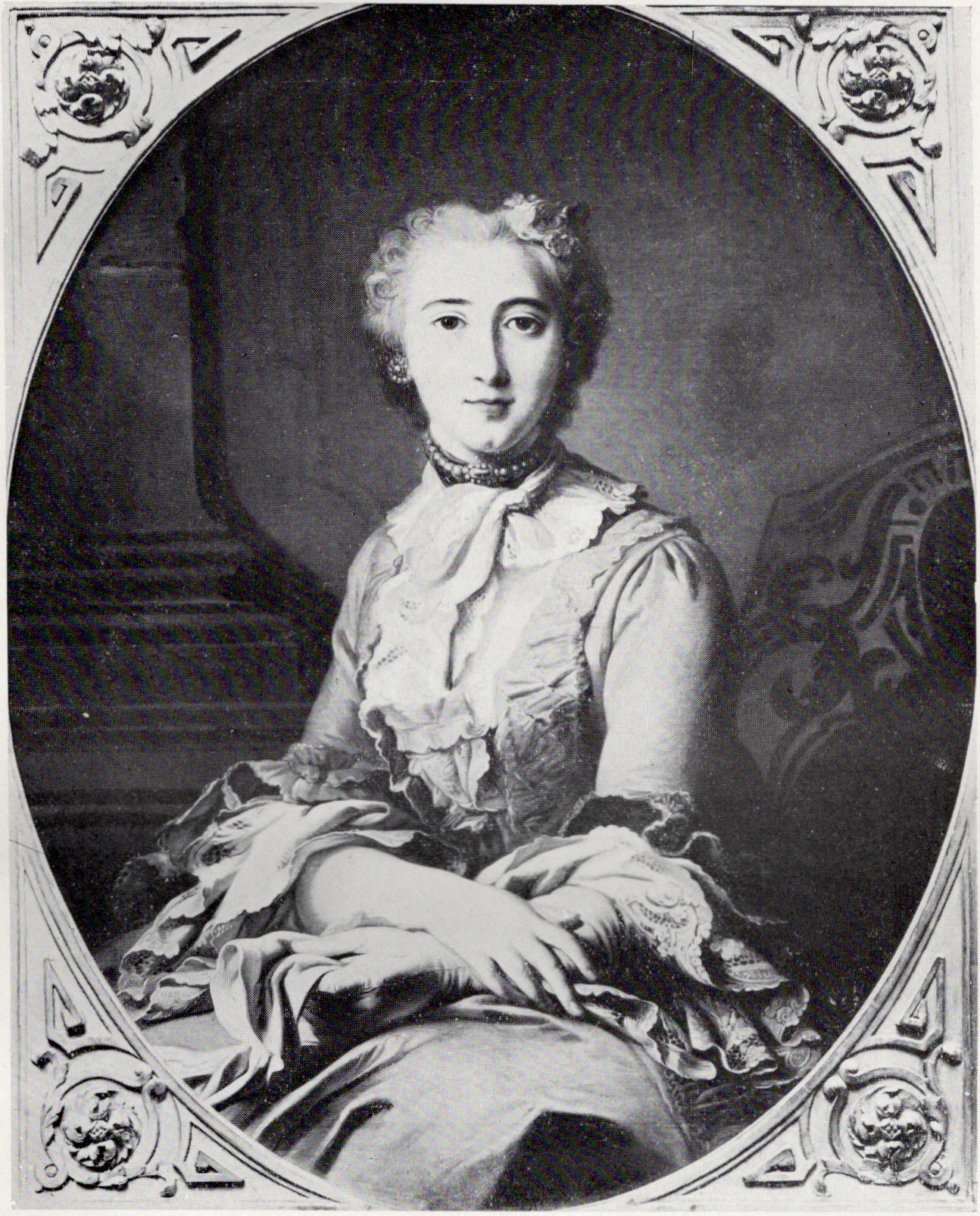
Portrait of Silvia by Van Loo

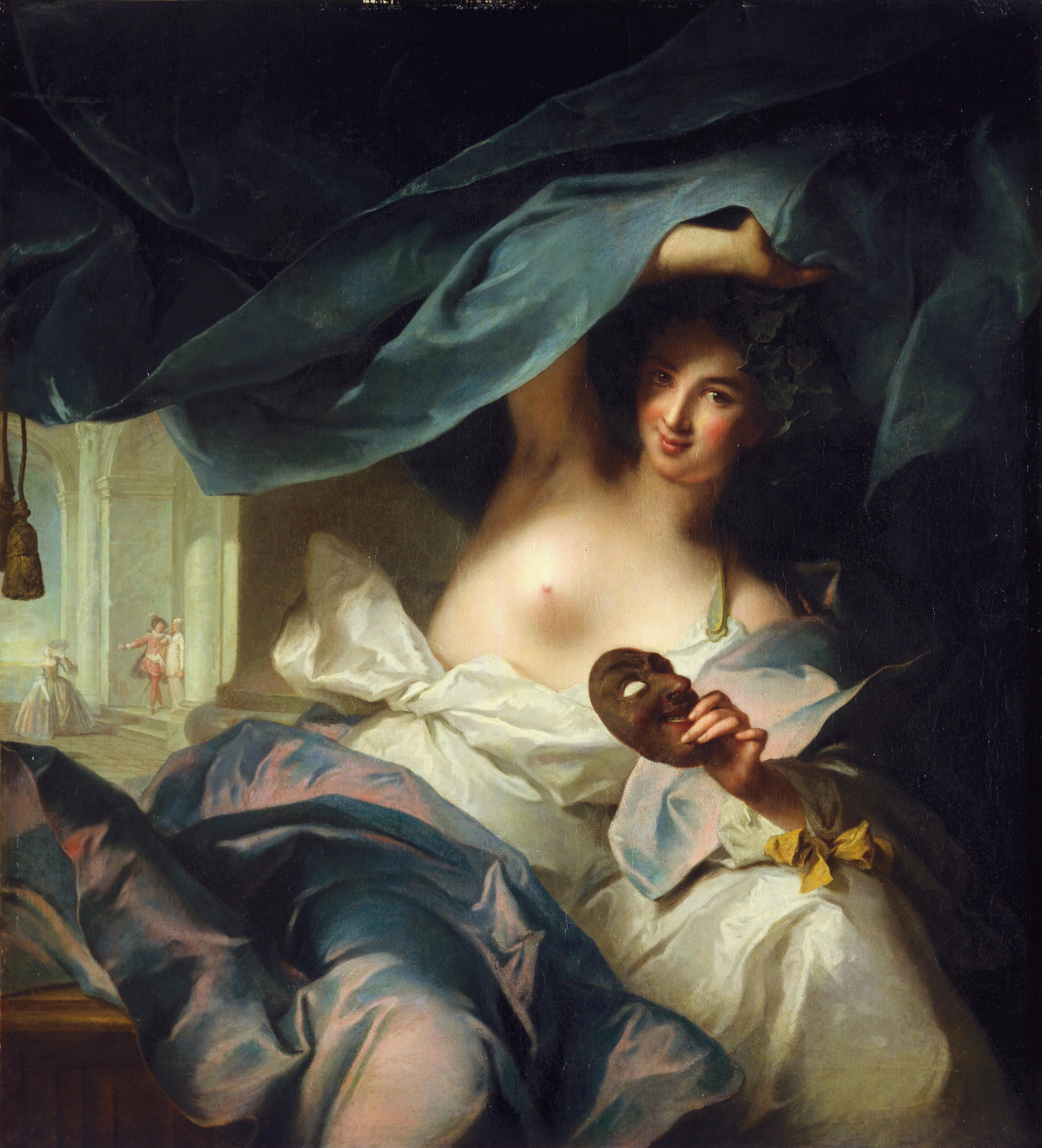
Thalia, the muse of acting. The model is presumed to be Silvia Balletti

== Bibliography ==
- Alessandro Ademollo (1884). Fanfulla della domenica (in Italian).
- Alessandro Ademollo (1885). Una famiglia di comici italiani (in Italian). C, Ademollo e C. editori.
- Adolfo Bartoli (1880). Scenari inediti della Commedia dell'Arte. Contributo alla storia del teatro popolare italiano. Firenze G.C. Sansoni 1880 (in Italian). G.C. Sansoni.
- (in French) Micheline Boudet, La Comédie Italienne, Marivaux et Silvia, Paris, Albin Michel, 2001. ISBN 2-226-13001-2
- (in French) Émile Campardon Les Comédiens du roi de la troupe française pendant des deux derniers siècles; documents inédits recueillis aux archives nationales 1880. Paris, Berger-Levrault et C.ie Éditeurs.
- (in French) Jacques Casanova de Seingalt – Histoire de ma vie. Texte intégral du manuscrit original, suivi de textes inédits. Édition présentée et établie par Francis Lacassin. (ISBN 2-221-06520-4). Ed. Robert Laffont. 1993.
- (in Italian) Benedetta Craveri (a cura di) Lettere di Mademoiselle Aïssé a Madame C…Adelphi 1984 ISBN 978-88-459-0572-8 (pag. 41 e Regesto pag. 242).
- (in French) Georges Cucuel La Pouplinière et la musique de chambre au XVIII siècle. Paris, Librairie Fischbacher, Rue de Seine, 33 1913.
- (in French) Xavier de Courville, Un apôtre de l'art du théâtre au XVIII siècle Luigi Riccoboni, dit Lélio. Tome III (1732–1753). Librairie Théatrale, Paris, 1958.
- (in Italian) Edmond e Jules de Goncourt La donna nel XVIII secolo. (Pag. 342 nota 9, pag. Ed. Sellerio 2010).
- (in French) Antoine d'Origny, Annales du Théâtre Italien depuis son origine jusqu'à ce jour, dédiées au Roi par M. D'Origny, Paris, Veuve Duchesne, 1788, 3 voll.
- (in French) Antoine de Léris Dictionnaire portatif des théâtres l'origine des différens théâtres de Paris, Paris 1754.
- (in Italian) Emanuele De Luca, «Io Rinasco». Storia e repertorio della nouvelle Comédie Italienne Tesi di Laurea, Università degli Studi di Firenze, Facoltà di Lettere e Filosofia, 2006–2007, 2 voll.
- (in French) Desboulmiers: Histoire anecdotique et raisonnée du Théâtre-Italien Paris 1769
- (in French) Charles Simon Favart, Théâtre de M. Favart, ou Recueil Des Comédies, Parodies & Opéra-Comiques qu'il a donnés jusqu'à ce jour, Paris, Duchesne, 1763, 8 voll.
- Heartz, Daniel (2004). From Garrick to Gluck Essays on opera in the age of enlightenment. New York City: John A. Rice. Pendragon Press, Hillsdale NY. ISBN 1-57647-081-4.
- (in French) Geneviève Dubois-Kervran, L'acte de baptême de Silvia in Dix-Huitième Siècle, SFEDS n°35 2003
- Giacomo Oreglia (2002). Commedia dell'arte (in Swedish). Ordfront. ISBN 91-7324-602-6.
- (in French) François et Claude Parfaict, Histoire de l'Ancien Théâtre Italien, depuis son origine en France jusqu'à sa suppression en l'Année 1697. Suivie des extraits ou canevas des meilleures Pièces Italiennes qui n'ont jamais été imprimées, Paris, Rozet, 1767.
- (in French) Camille Pascal, Le goût du roi: Louis XV et Marie-Louise O'Murphy, Paris, Librairie Académique Perrin, 2006, ISBN 978-2-262-01704-0
- (in Italian) Aldo Ravà (a cura di), Lettere di donne a G. Casanova, Milano, Fratelli Treves, 1912.
- (in French) Charles Samaran, Jacques Casanova, Vénitien, une vie d'aventurier au XVIII siècle, Parigi, Calmann-Lévy, 1914.
