= Parfaict =

Parfaict is a surname. Notable people with the surname include:

- Claude Parfaict (fl. 18th century), French theatre historian, younger brother of François Parfaict
- François Parfaict (fl. 18th century), French theatre historian

== See also ==
- Parfait (disambiguation)
- Perfect (disambiguation)
