= Richemont-Banchereau =

French lawyer and playwright (17th century)

Richemont-Banchereau (first name unknown, born 1612, Saumur) was a 17th-century French lawyer and playwright.

A lawyer in Parlement, Banchereau is known only by two plays he wrote, aged twenty, and published in Paris in 1632:

- L'Espérance glorieuse ou Amour et Justice, a tragicomedy in five acts and in verse (dedicated to the Prince of Condé)
- Les Passions égarées ou le Roman du temps, a tragicomedy in five acts and in verse

== Sources ==
- Antoine de Léris, Dictionnaire portatif historique et littéraire des théâtres, contenant l'origine des differens théâtres de Paris, seconde édition, revue, corrigée & considérablement augmentée, Paris, C. A. Jombert, 1758.
- Nouvelle biographie générale depuis les temps les plus reculés jusqu'à nos jours avec les renseignements bibliographiques et l'indication des sources à consulter, publiée par MM. Firmin Didot frères, sous la direction de M. le Dr. Hoefer, 1852.
- Pierre Larousse, Grand dictionnaire universel du XIXe siècle, 15 vol. 1863–1890
