= Gaspard Le Roux =

French harpsichordist and composer (c. 1670–1706)

- Born: c. 1670; France
- Died: c. August 1706 (aged 35–36)
- Occupations: Harpsichordist; composer
- Years active: Early 1700s
- Notable work: Pieces de Clavessin

Gaspard Le Roux (c. 1670 – c. August 1706) was a French harpsichordist active in Paris at the beginning of the 18th century.

Little is known of his life, which is exacerbated by the commonality of his name among musicians and dance instructors in Paris. A "Le Roux" is mentioned as the contributor of an air spirituel in Mercure galant (March 1690), but whether this refers to Gaspard in unclear. The name is also found in Nicolas de Blégny's Le Livre commode contenant les adresses de la ville de Paris ... pour l'année 1692, although no address is included; in a tax document, Rolle des sommes qui seront payées par les Organistes et Professeurs de Clavecin de la Ville et fauxbourgs; two records of Gaspard Le Roux receiving annuities through the notaire publique Alexandre Lebèvre are dated 8 May 1702 and 5 August 1706 (this is the last known reference to Le Roux); and the record of his being granted a Privilège du Roy [sic] dated 9 April 1705. A previously discovered reference by French musicologist Pierre Hardouin that claimed the receipt of an inventory of Le Roux's chattels on 7 June 1707 has been proved incorrect. Hardouin mistook the name Gaspard Roux as Gaspard Leroux: Roux has been traced as far back as 1 February 1694; subsequent entries describe him as le sr Roux (14 June 1696) and bourgeois de Paris (7 September 1696), suggesting the subject Hardouin mistook as Gaspard Le Roux was someone other, possibly a rentier who lived off annuities from the town of Paris.

Le Roux is known only for his 1705 publication, Pieces de Clavessin, that are arranged into seven 'suites' (a term which was not used by Le Roux). These were engraved by Henry de Baussen and sold chez auteur, meaning Le Roux was responsible for not only the costs of engraving and printing, but also in securing the correct accreditation from the state. It was sold from the shop of Henry Foucault – "a L'entrée de la rüe Saint honnoré A la Regle D'Or" and cost ten livres 'en blanc' and eleven livres, ten sous in bound format. With the exception of the preludes and three dances, there are also found arrangements and five examples of realised contreparties, which arrange the second and bass lines of the trios as their starting points. The book suggests that Le Roux was a natural teacher, giving practical advice such as to sing the melodies and accompany them using the trios' thoroughbasses before playing them; it is also demonstrational, providing differing examples of dances and styles. If one imagines a spectrum, with Charles Dieupart (1701) at the French end, Elizabeth Jacquet de la Guerre's second book (1707) in the middle, and François Couperin in his most Italianate moments at the Italian end, Le Roux's style falls slightly to the French side of Jacquet.

== Bibliography ==
- Le Roux, Gaspard (Paris, 1705). Pieces de clavessin. Baxendale, J (ed.); Tynset: Lyrebird Music, 2020; 3 volumes.
- Le Roux, Gaspard (Paris, 1705). Pieces for Harpsichord. Fuller, A (ed.); Leipzig: Peters Edition, 1959.

== Discography ==
- Suites pour deux clavecins. Harpsichordists: William Christie and Arthur Haas. Harpsichord maker: William Dowd, after Taskin. LP . Harmonia Mundi HM 399. 08/1977
