= Château de Blandy-les-Tours =

Medieval castle in Seine-et-Marne, France

Coordinates: 48.5672°N 2.7814°E

The Château de Blandy-les-Tours is a medieval castle in the village of Blandy-les-Tours (Seine-et-Marne, France); it is about 5 km from the château de Vaux-le-Vicomte and 10 km from Melun. The castle is in the middle of the village. Its restoration began in 1992.

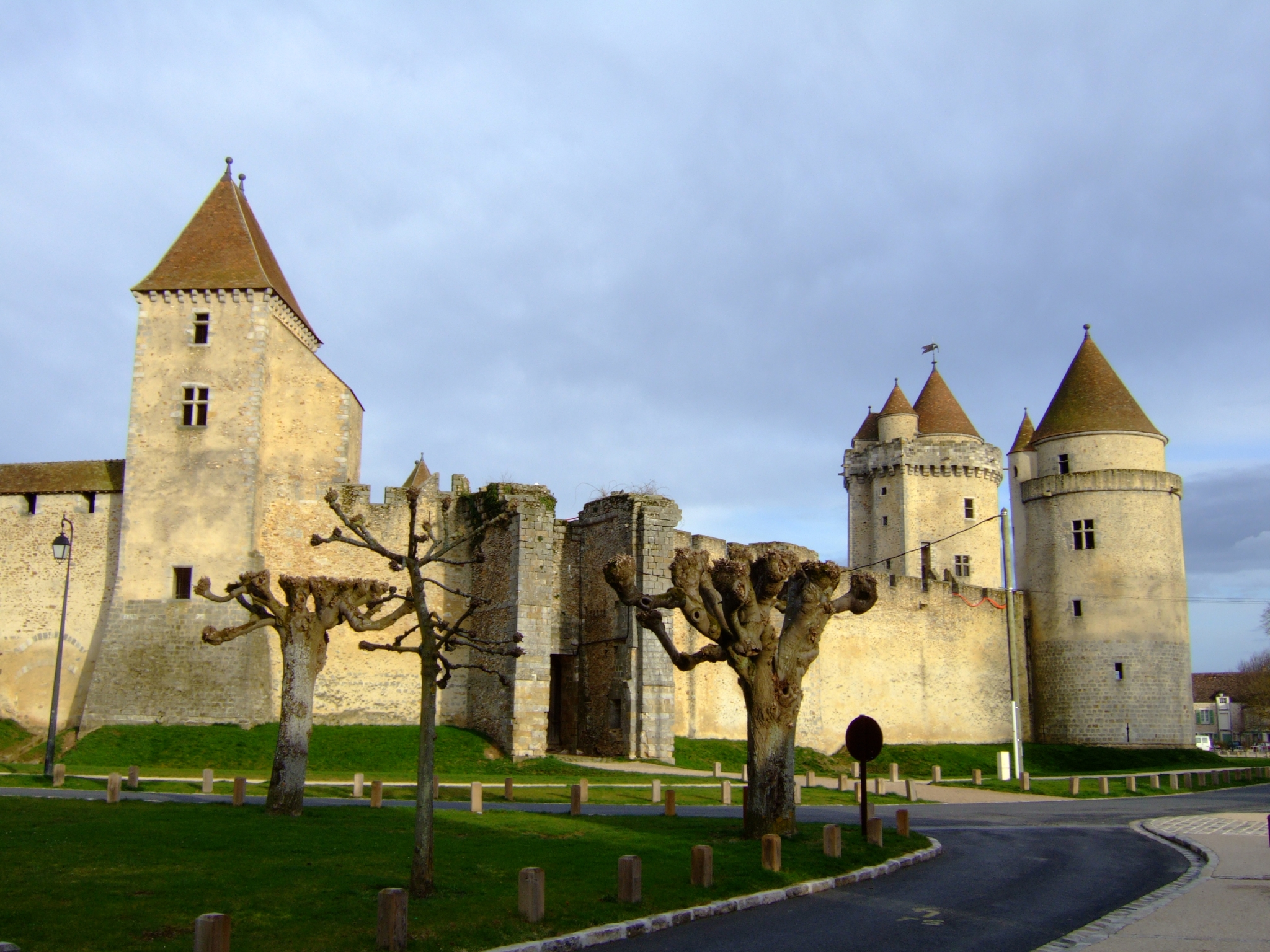
The square tower and the main entrance

== History ==
The site was previously a Merovingian necropolis.

It was mentioned in a text in 1216. It belonged to Adam II de Chailly, Viscount of Melun and consisted of a simple manner; inside of which was a chapel, the only construction made of stone.

In the 14th century, the castle was strongly modified with new fortifications and structures of defence: a moat was dug and a new gate-tower with a drawbridge was included in the enclosing wall. The kings Charles V (1364 - 1380) and Charles VI (1380 - 1422) financed the transformation into a castle for the successive owners of the castle, the counts de Tancarville Jean II and his grandson Guillaume IV. A high keep, defended by two drawbridges, was built. The curtain wall was modified by the addition of new towers. All these modifications took place during the Hundred Years' War.

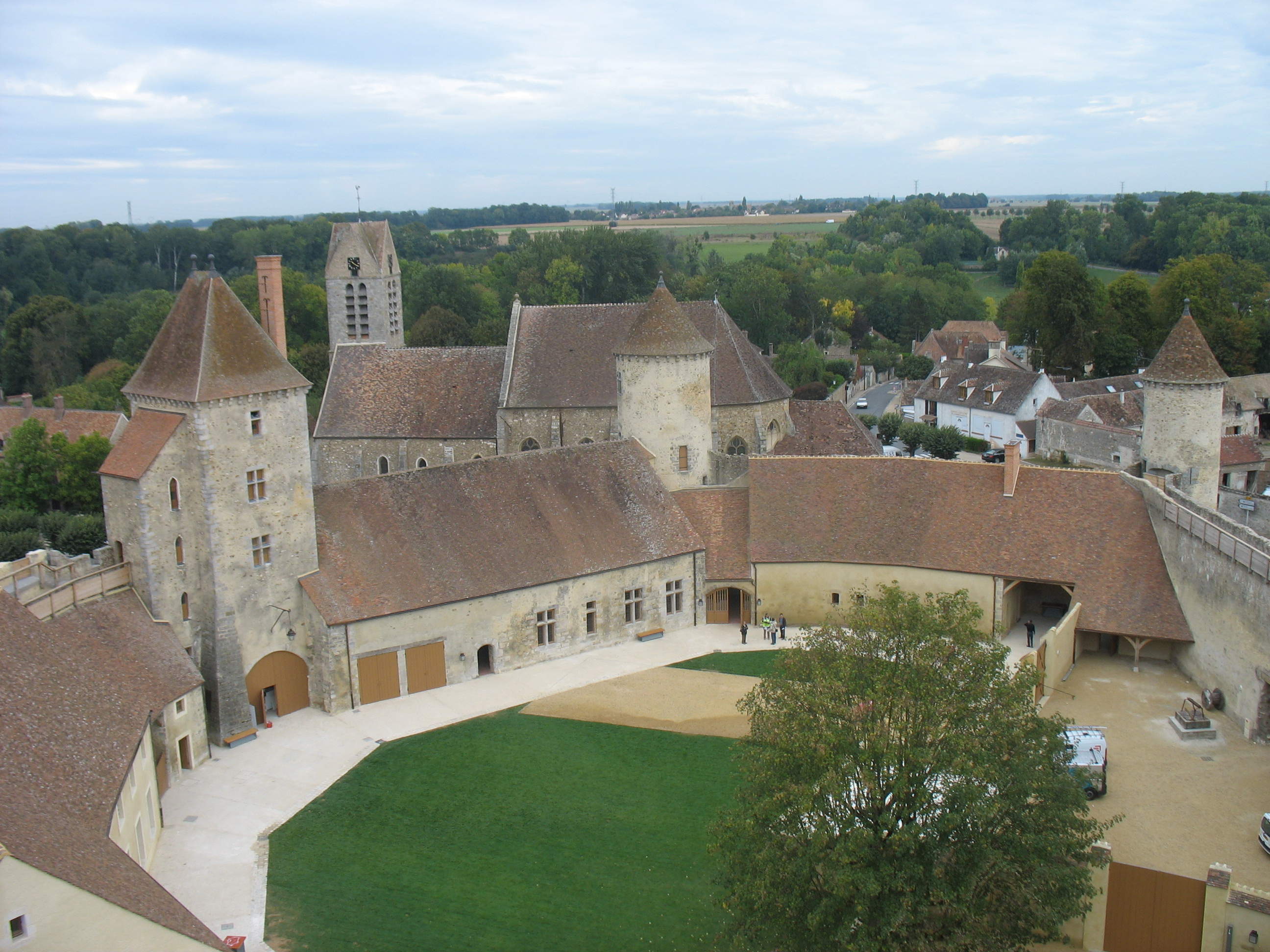
The courtyard, seen from the keep

However, the castle of Blandy-les-Tours was rebuilt in the 16th century by François II of Orleans. The castle consequently became a residence. The princess of Cleves married there in 1572 in the presence of the future Henry IV. But, the castle often changed owner and worsened gradually with various dwellings inside the enclosure.

After the 17th century restorations, the marshal de Villars, owner of the castle of Vaux-le-Vicomte, bought the land and the castle of Blandy. He decided to dismantle it and transformed it into a farm. The roofs were taken from the towers, the parapets were destroyed, and the large gatehouse was dismantled.

In 1764, it was resold to the duke of Choiseul-Praslin, minister of Louis XV.

In 1888, Pierre-Charles Tuot, the mayor of Blandy-les-Tours, bought it and gave it to the municipality, no building remains in the ruined enclosure. It became a Monument historique in 1889.

In the 1970s, volunteer associations began the first works to safeguard the castle.

Acquired by the conseil général (general council) of Seine-et-Marne in 1992, the castle became the subject of a complete project of restoration, respecting the principal historical stages of the monument.

== Structure of the castle ==
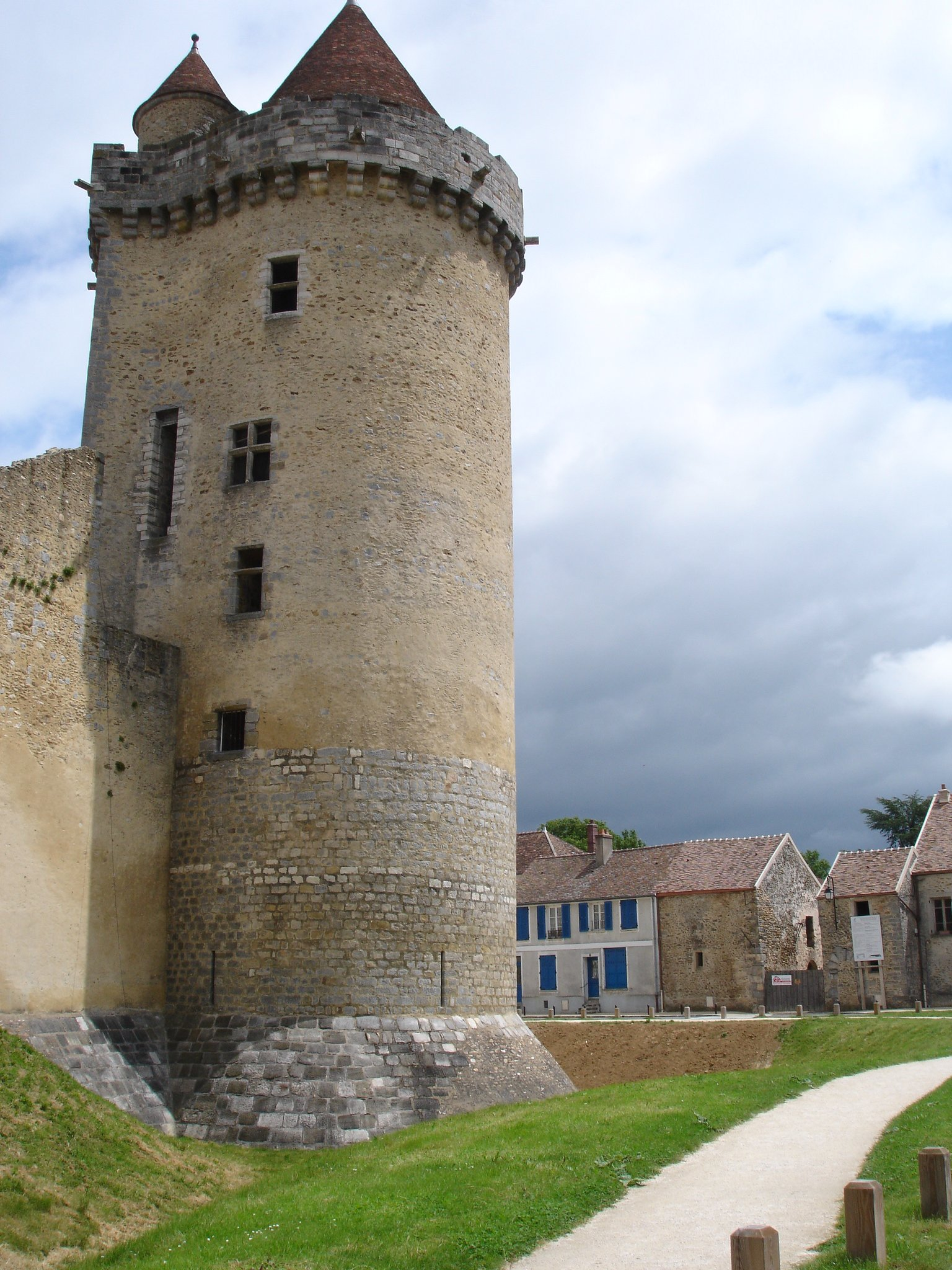
The keep

The keep of the castle is built as part of a hexagonal enclosure, around the castle chapel. It stands 35 m high inside a polygonal enclosure of 14th century round towers. In the courtyard are the remains of the Merovingian crypt.

The castle of Blandy is a typical example of a 13th-century feudal fortress, later transformed into a great lordly residence in the style of the late 14th century.

The enclosure holds 6 towers:

- the square tower - the former gatehouse (la tour carrée)
- the moral tower (la tour morale)
- the tower of justice (la tour de la justice)
- the tower of the archives (la tour des archives)
- the keep (le donjon)
- the tower of the guards (la tour des gardes)

The bases of the three last towers were raised after 1370 out of sandstone from Fontainebleau, whereas the higher stages were completed about 1390 by Guillaume IV out of gritstone, a more economic material. The keep had three points of entry, a feature thought to be rare.

== See also ==
List of castles in France
