= Manon (given name) =

Manon is a Welsh, French and Dutch feminine given name. Its meaning in Welsh is: 'beautiful queen' and in French, it is a diminutive of the name Marie. Notable people with the name include:

== Artists ==
- Manon (artist) (born 1940), Swiss artist
- Manon Awst, Welsh artist
- Manon de Boer (born 1966), Dutch video artist
- Manon Cleary (1942–2011), American painter
- Christian Manon (born 1950), French-Australian actor

== Athletes ==
- Manon André (born 1986), French rugby player
- Manon Arcangioli (born 1994), French tennis player
- Manon Bakker (born 1999), Dutch cyclist
- Manon Audinet (born 1992), French sailor
- Manon Bollegraf (born 1964), Dutch tennis player
- Manon Boonjumnong (born 1982), Thai boxer
- Manon Bornholdt (born 1950), German athlete
- Manon Brunet (born 1996), French fencer
- Manon Carpenter (born 1993), Welsh racing cyclist
- Manon Charette (1955–2006), Canadian handball player
- Manon Depuydt (born 1997), Belgian sprinter
- Manon Fiorot (born 1990), French mixed martial artist
- Manon Heil (born 1997), French association football player
- Manon Hostens (born 1994), French canoeist
- Manon Houette (born 1992), French handball player
- Manon Johnes (born 2000), Welsh rugby player
- Manon Jutras (born 1967), Canadian road cyclist
- Manon Kaji (born 2004), Japanese snowboarder
- Manon Kriéger (born 1993), French badminton player
- Manon Léonard (born 2001), French tennis player
- Manon Lloyd (born 1996), Welsh track cyclist
- Manon Masseurs (born 1974), Dutch swimmer
- Manon Melis (born 1986), Dutch footballer
- Manon Nummerdor-Flier (born 1984), Dutch volleyball player
- Manon Petit-Lenoir (born 1998), French snowboarder
- Manon Rhéaume (born 1972), Canadian ice hockey goaltender
- Manon Valentino (born 1990), French cyclist
- Manon van Raay (born 2003), Dutch footballer
- Manon van Rooijen (born 1982), Dutch swimmer
- Manon Vernay (born 1989), French handball player

== Filmmakers ==
- Manon Barbeau (born 1949), Canadian filmmaker
- Manon Briand (born 1964), Canadian film director

== Politicians ==
- Manon Antoniazzi (born 1965), Welsh senior civil servant
- Manon Aubry (born 1989), French politician
- Manon Barbe, Canadian politician
- Manon Blanchet (born 1968), Canadian politician
- Manon Fokke (born 1976), Dutch Labour Party politician
- Manon Gauthier, Montreal politician
- Manon Massé (born 1963), Canadian politician
- Manon Meunier (born 1996), French politician
- Manon Perreault (born 1965), Canadian politician

== Performers ==
- Manon Bannerman (born 2002), Swiss singer and model, member of Katseye
- Manon Bresch (born 1998), French-Cameroonian actress
- Manon Capelle, Belgian actress
- Manon Kahle (born 1980), American actress
- Manon Kirouac (born 1950), Canadian pop singer known as "Anne Renée"

== Others ==
- Manon Balletti (1740–1776), Italian lover of the legendary womanizer Casanova
- Manon Dubé (died 1978), female murder victim
- Manon Gropius (1916–1935), Austrian muse
- Manon Rasmussen (born 1951), Danish costume designer
- Manon Roland (1754–1793), French revolutionary
- Manon Steffan Ros (born 1983), Welsh writer

== Fictional characters ==
- Manon (character), an animated character from children's books, magazines and television
- Manon, the fictional title character of the 1962 novel Manon des sources, by Marcel Pagnol, and subsequent adaptations
- Manon Blackbeak, character from the Throne of Glass Series by New York Times bestselling author Sarah J. Maas
- Manon Chamack, a character from the Miraculous: Tales of Ladybug & Cat Noir animated series
- Manon Lescaut, title character of the 1731 novel by Abbé Prévost
- Manon, a character from the game Street Fighter 6
- Marieanne "Manon" Vacher, a character in the game Dead Plate.
- Manon, a mutant character in Marvel Comics and member of the New Mutants
