= Manon Balletti =

Italian actress (1740–1776)

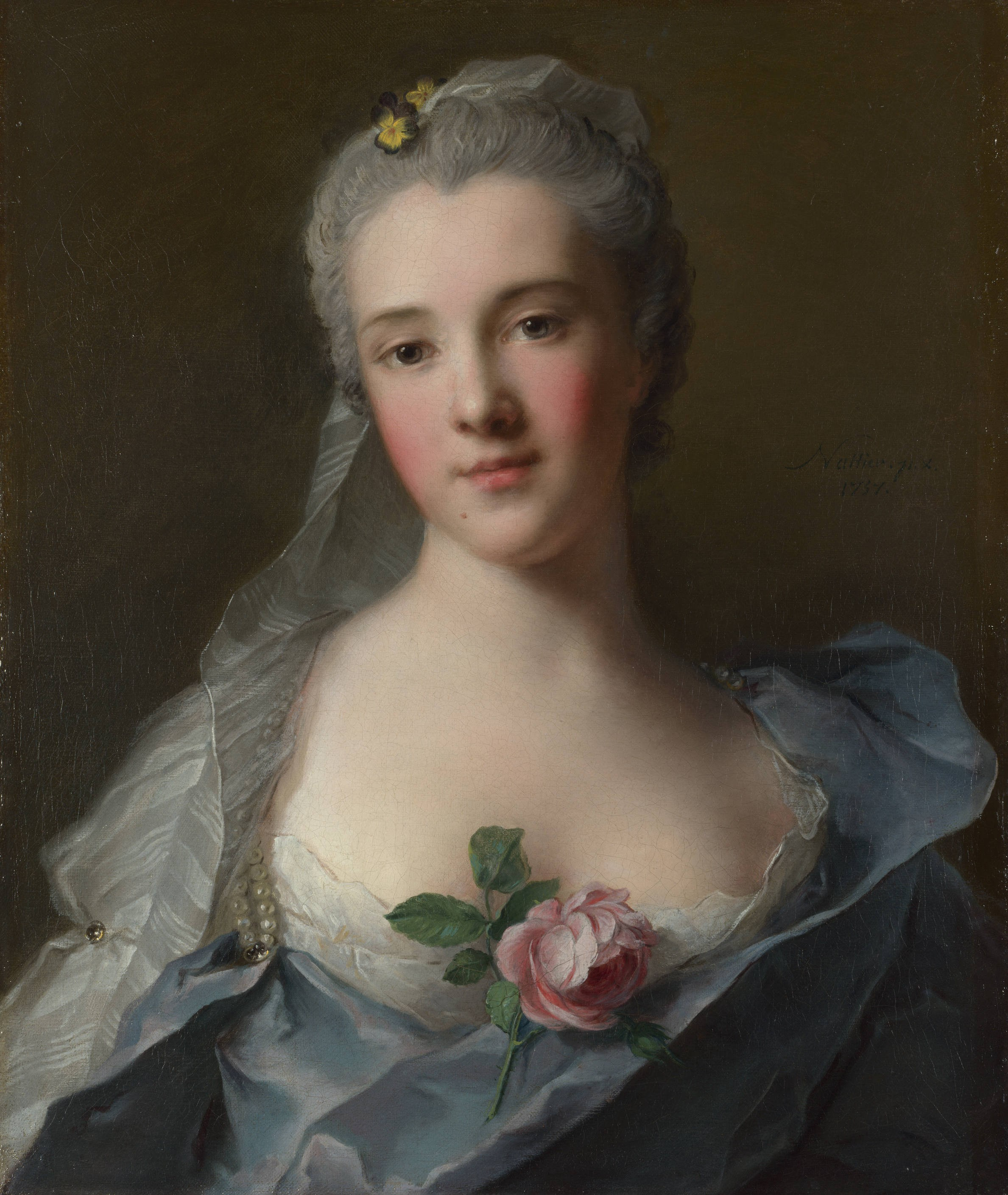
- Born: 1740
- Died: 1776 (aged 35–36)
- Occupation: Actress

Manon Balletti (1740–1776) was the daughter of Italian actors performing in France and lover of the famous adventurer Giacomo Casanova. She was ten years old when she first met him; she happened to be the daughter of Silvia Balletti, an actress of the Comédie Italienne company and younger sister of Casanova's closest friend.

The lovers started their relationship when Casanova was thirty-two years old and Manon was seventeen. (Although Manon's mother was associated with acting, considered disreputable at the time, mother and daughter were observed by Casanova to be of a "pure nature".) She wrote forty-two letters full of love and deep feelings for him; a well-known quote from these letters describes Casanova as: "My lover, my husband, my friend". Casanova's sexual passions caused him to be unfaithful, causing their three-year relationship to have numerous ups and downs. Yet she continued to share his home, found in Rue du Petit-Lion-St. Sauveur. Manon was at the time engaged to her clavichord teacher, but broke it off at Casanova's request, thus starting a new engagement with him. This did not keep him from having various sexual relations with other women, yet Manon remained faithful to him. His memoirs record his regret for being unkind to her when having these affairs.

Once Casanova was imprisoned after he was sued by creditors in Paris. Manon sent a pair of diamond earrings with which she bought him out. Subsequently she ended the engagement and returned his portrait and letters. Manon married the architect Jacques-François Blondel a short while after, disappointing Casanova, who believed that he would one day be able to settle down with her.

Manon died at the age of 36, likely from pulmonary hypertension. Casanova wrote in his memoirs that he believed his behavior shortened her life.

== See also ==
- Manon (given name)
