= Jean-François Blondel =

French architect (1683–1756)

Jean-François Blondel (1683 – 9 October 1756) was a French architect.

== Biography ==
Born in Rouen, Blondel was admitted in the Académie d'Architecture in 1728.

He was the master and uncle of Jacques-François. He also had another nephew as a student, Jean-Baptiste Michel Vallin de la Mothe, whom he took in his agency on his return from Rome.

== Main realisations ==
- Maison Mallet, Geneva, 1724
- Maison de Saussure, Creux de Genthod, 1724-1730
- Maison Rouillé, Paris, 1732–1739
- Manufacture des tabacs de Morlaix, 1736-1740
- Palais des Consuls in Rouen, 1741-1747 (destroyed in 1944)
- Hôtel des gardes du Roi, Versailles, 1750-1754
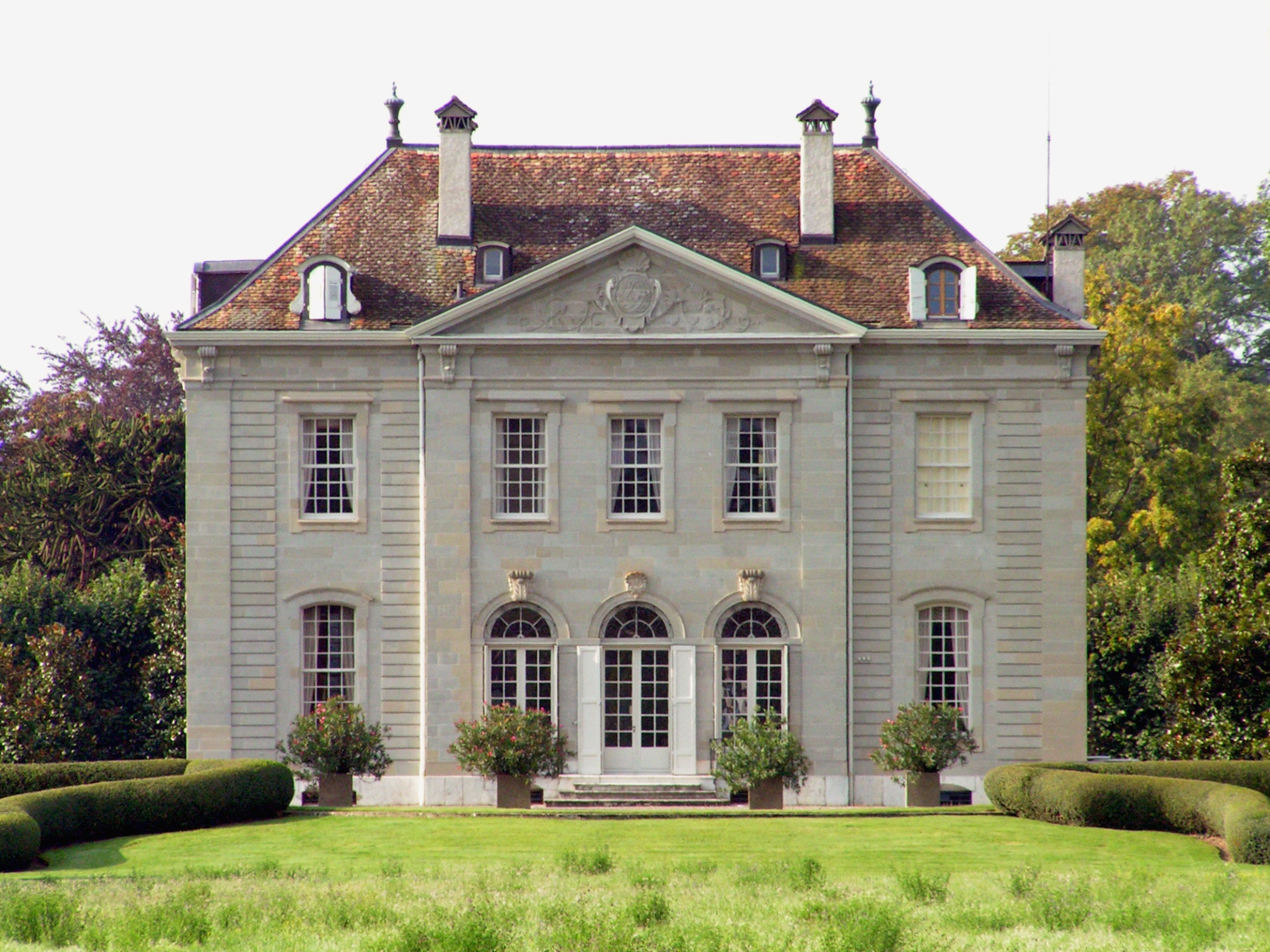
Maison de Saussure, Creux de Genthod

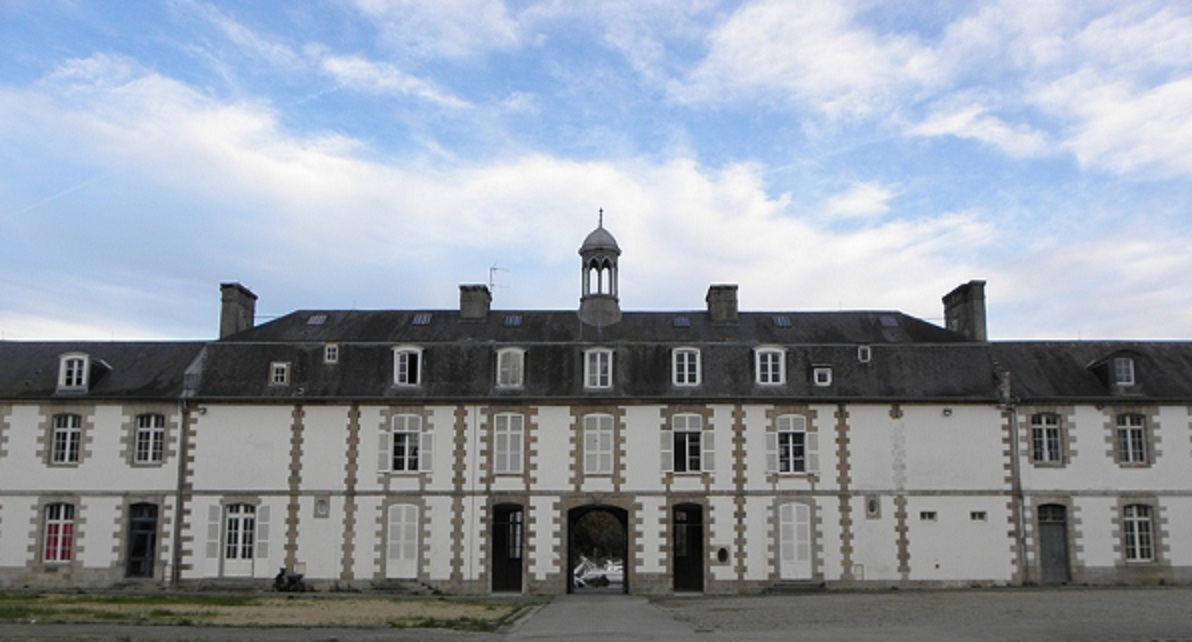
Manufacture des tabacs de Morlaix

== Bibliography ==
- de Pénanrun, David; Roux, Louis Thérèse; Delaire, Edmond Augustin (1907). Les Architectes élèves de l'école des beaux-arts (1793-1907) (in French). Librairie de la construction moderne. DPRD1907.
- Bauchal, Charles (1887). Nouveau dictionnaire des architectes français (in French). André, Daly fils et Cie. CB1887.
- Harrington, Kevin (1982). "Blondel, Jean François", vol. 1, pp. 234–236, in Macmillan Encyclopedia of Architects, four volumes, edited by Adolf K. Placzek. London: The Free Press. ISBN 0-02-925000-5.
- Mauban, André (1944). Jean Marot: Architecte et Graveur Parisien. Paris: Les Éditions d'Art et d'Histoire. OCLC 7057275. Catalog record at HathiTrust.
