= Blandy, Seine-et-Marne =

Blandy
- Commune
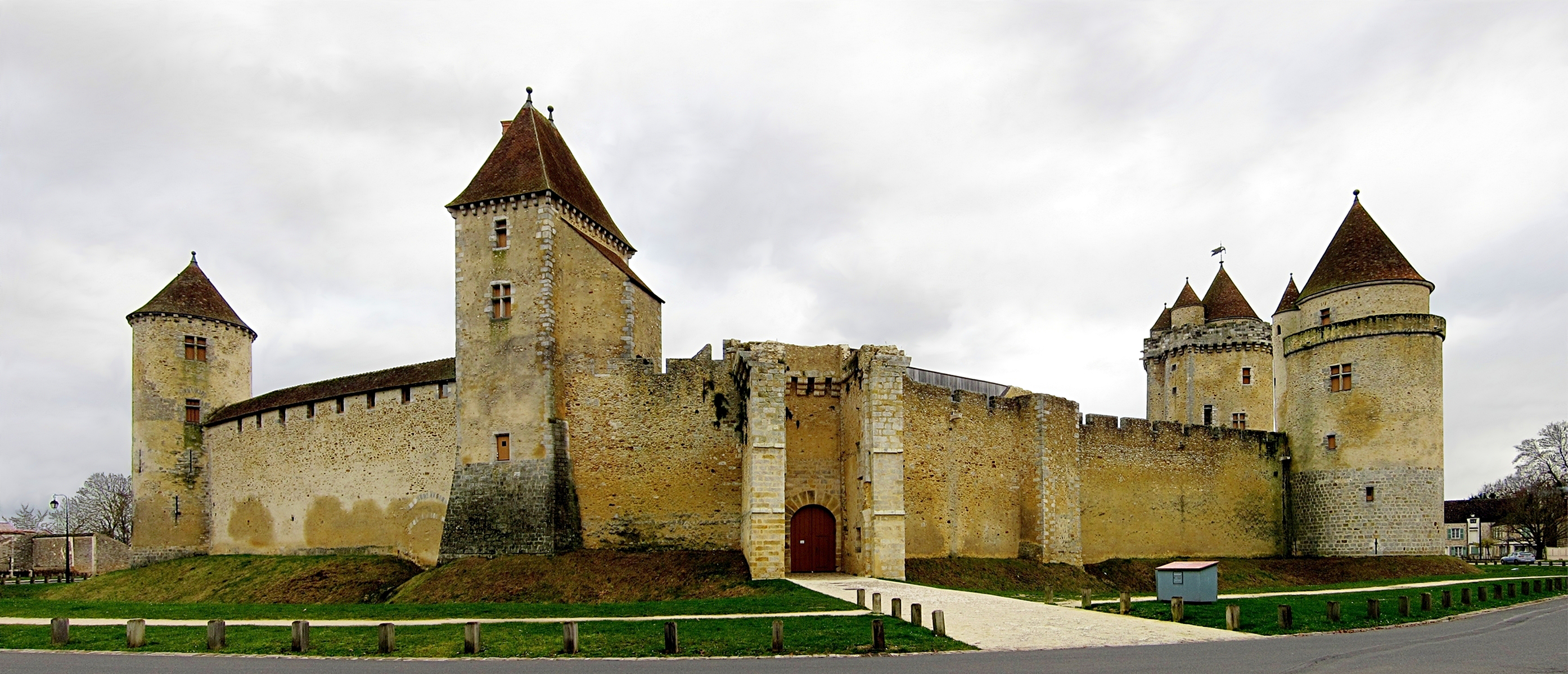
- Château de Blandy-les-Tours

- Coat of arms
- Location of Blandy
- Location within France Location within Île-de-France (region)
- Coordinates: 48°34′01″N 2°46′58″E
- Country: France
- Region: Île-de-France
- Department: Seine-et-Marne
- Arrondissement: Melun
- Canton: Nangis
- Intercommunality: CC Brie des Rivières et Châteaux

Government
  - Mayor (2020–2026): Patrice Motté
- Area^{1}: 14.02 km^{2} (5.41 sq mi)
- Highest elevation: 104 m (341 ft)
- Lowest elevation: 59 m (194 ft)
- Population (2023): 763
  - Density: 54.4/km^{2} (141/sq mi)
- Time zone: UTC+01:00 (CET)
  - Summer (DST): UTC+02:00 (CEST)
- INSEE/Postal code: 77034 /77115
- ^{1} French Land Register data, which excludes lakes, ponds, glaciers > 1 km^{2} (0.386 sq mi or 247 acres) and river estuaries.

Blandy (French pronunciation: [blɑ̃di]; also known as Blandy-les-Tours) is a commune in the Seine-et-Marne department in the Île-de-France region in north-central France.

== Demography ==
The inhabitants are called Blandynois.

== Places of interest ==
- Château de Blandy-les-Tours
- Church of Saint Maurice (14th et 16th centuries)

== See also ==
- Daniel Gittard (1625–1686), architect, born in Blandy-les-Tours
- Communes of the Seine-et-Marne department
