= Académie royale d'architecture =

French learned society

Académie Royale d'Architecture
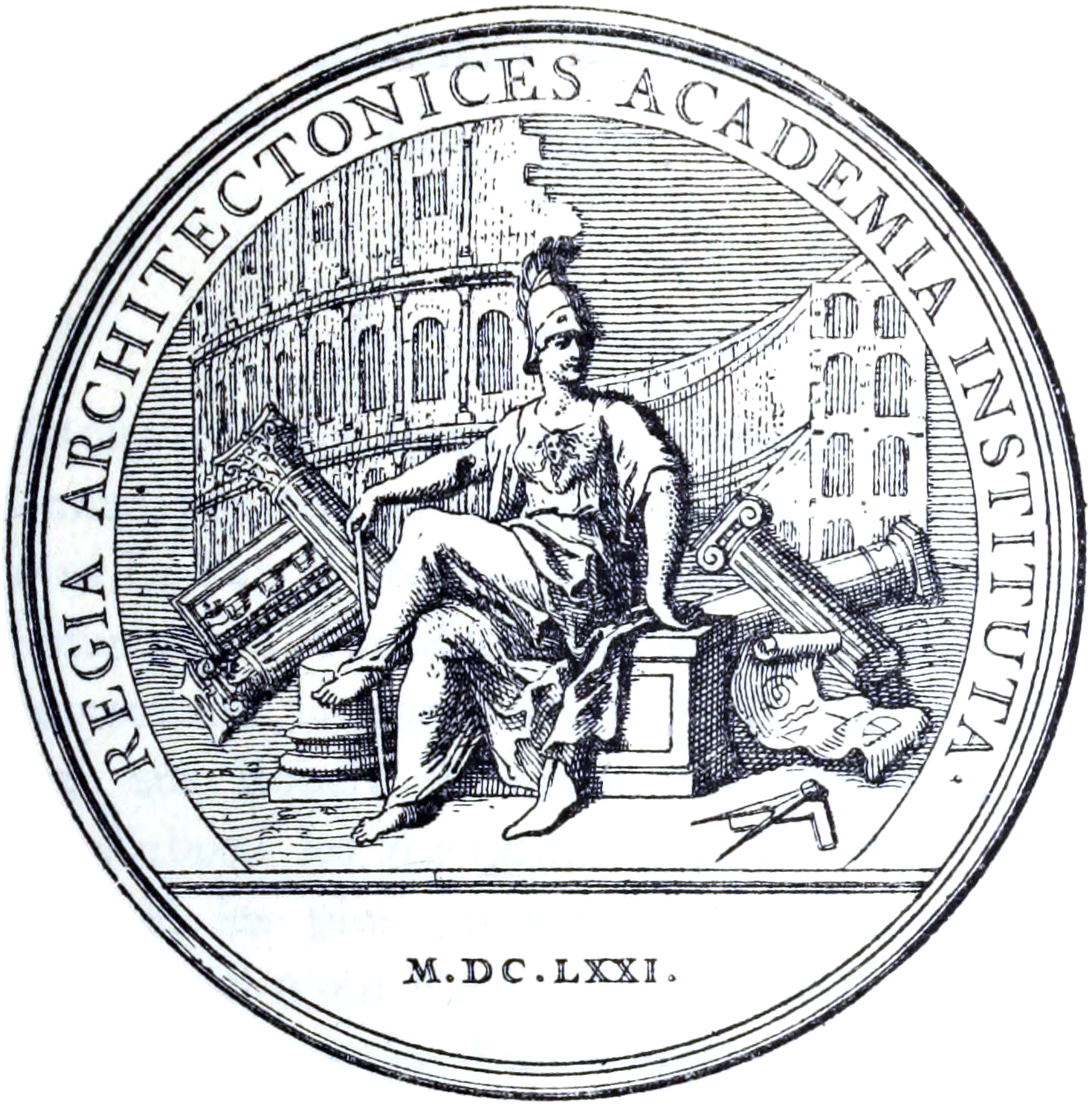
- Commemorative medallion, 1671
- Latin: Regia architectonices academia instituta MDCLXXI
- Founders: Louis XIV; Jean-Baptiste Colbert
- Established: 1671
- Head: François Blondel (1671)
- Members: 8 at founding; 33 in 1793
- Location: Paris, France
- Dissolved: 1793, 1816

The Académie Royale d'Architecture (French pronunciation: [akademi ʁwajal daʁʃitɛktyʁ]; English: "Royal Academy of Architecture") was a French learned society founded in 1671. It had a leading role in influencing architectural theory and education, not only in France, but throughout Europe and the Americas from the late 17th century to the mid-20th.

== History ==
The Académie Royale d'Architecture was founded on December 30, 1671, by Louis XIV, king of France under the impulsion of Jean-Baptiste Colbert. Its first director was the mathematician and engineer François Blondel (1618–1686), and the secretary was André Félibien (1619 –1695).

The academy was housed in the Louvre for most of its existence, and included a school of architecture. Its members met weekly. Jacques-François Blondel describes the academy quarters in his Architecture françoise of 1756. The main rooms were on the ground floor and included two lecture halls, one for meetings of the academy members on Mondays and mathematics lectures on Wednesdays (B3), and another for public lectures on architecture on Mondays (B4). There was also a large room for the display of architectural models (B5). The rooms for the secretary of the academy were in the mezzanine level, reached via the staircase. The academy quarters were temporarily roofed at the level of the main floor (premier étage), since much of the Louvre still lacked a roof at the level of the attic. The attic roof was finally added under Napoleon.

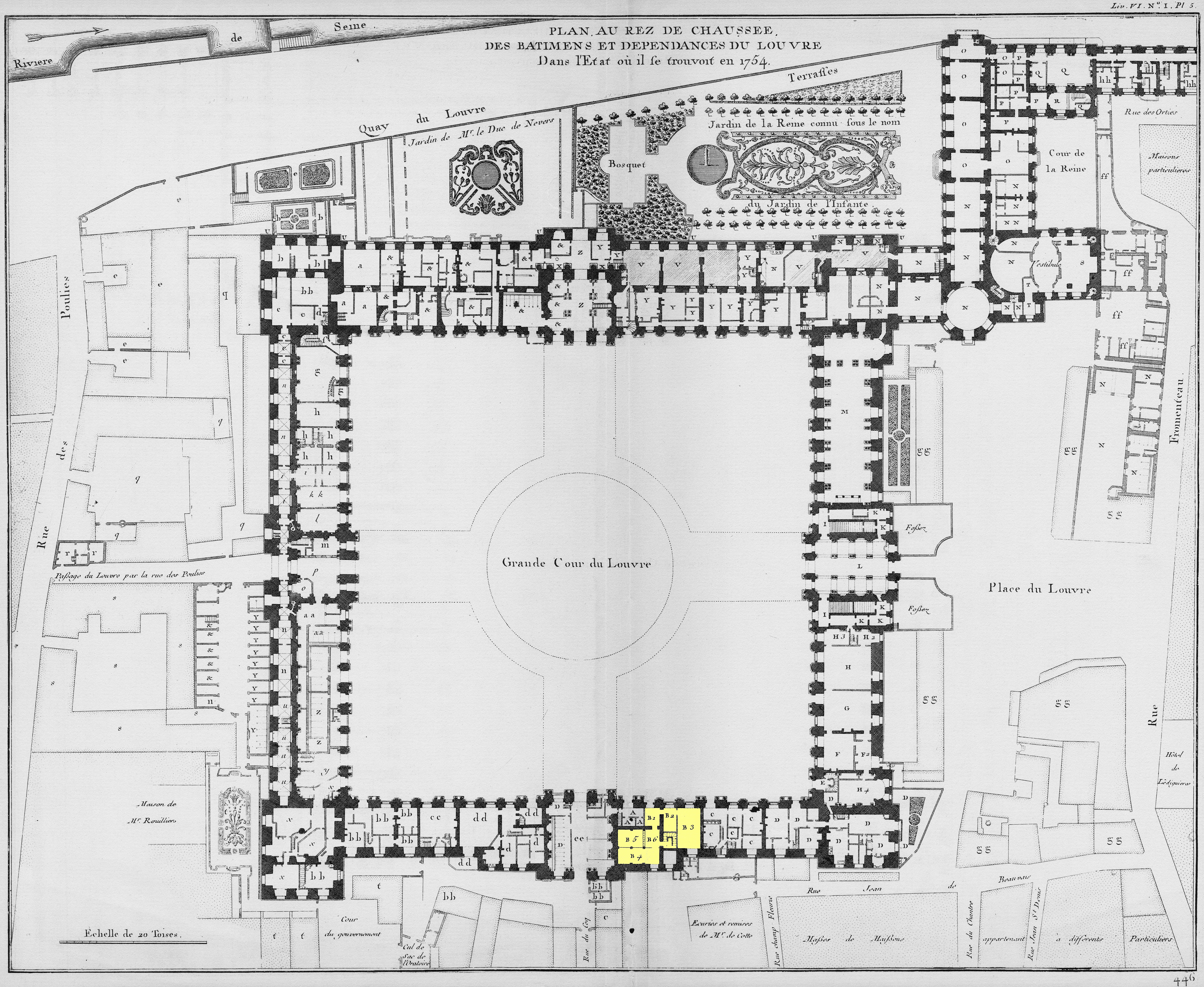
Louvre ground-floor plan of 1754 showing the Académie rooms (yellow), located in the north wing (bottom)

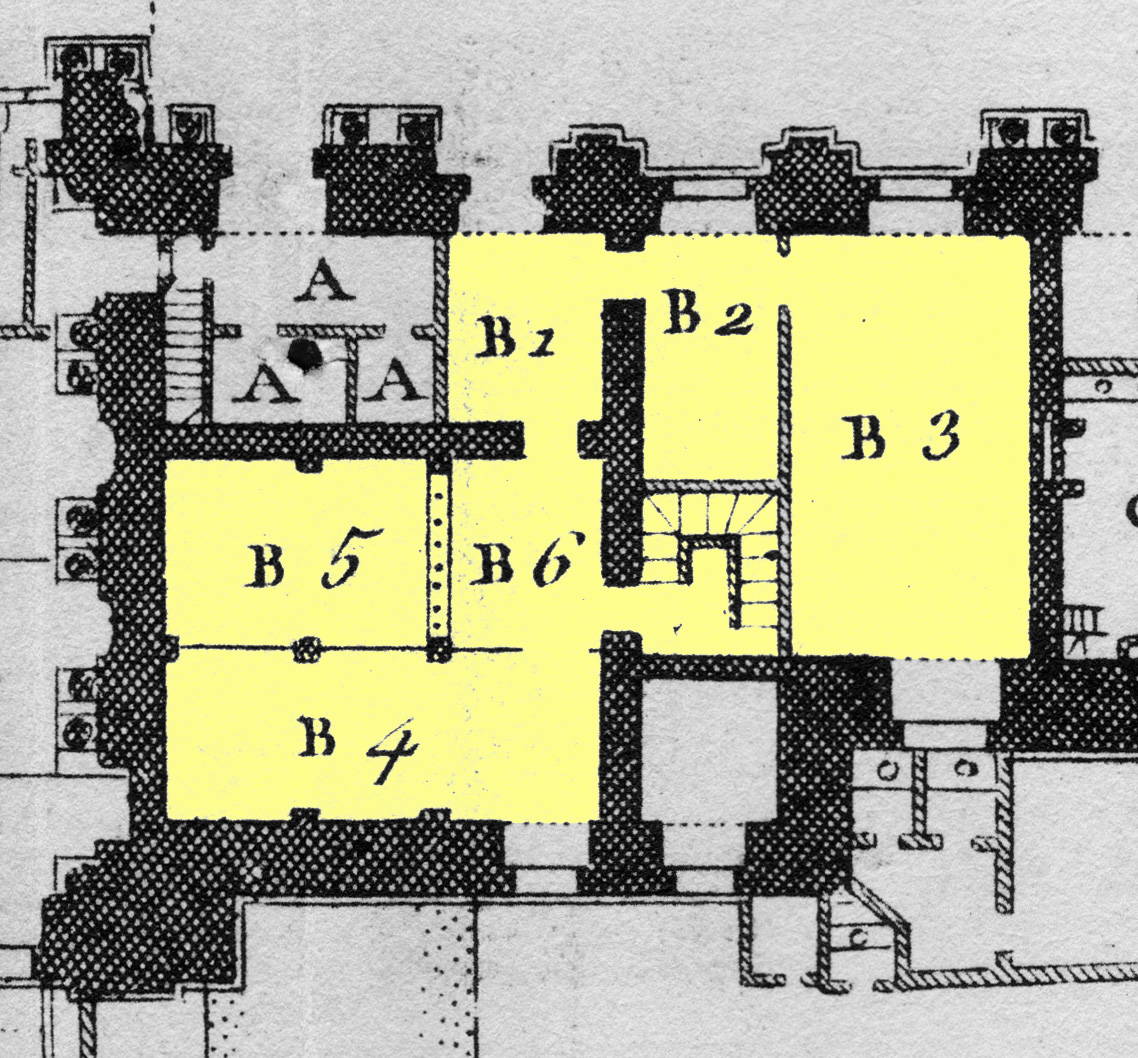
Detail showing the Académie rooms

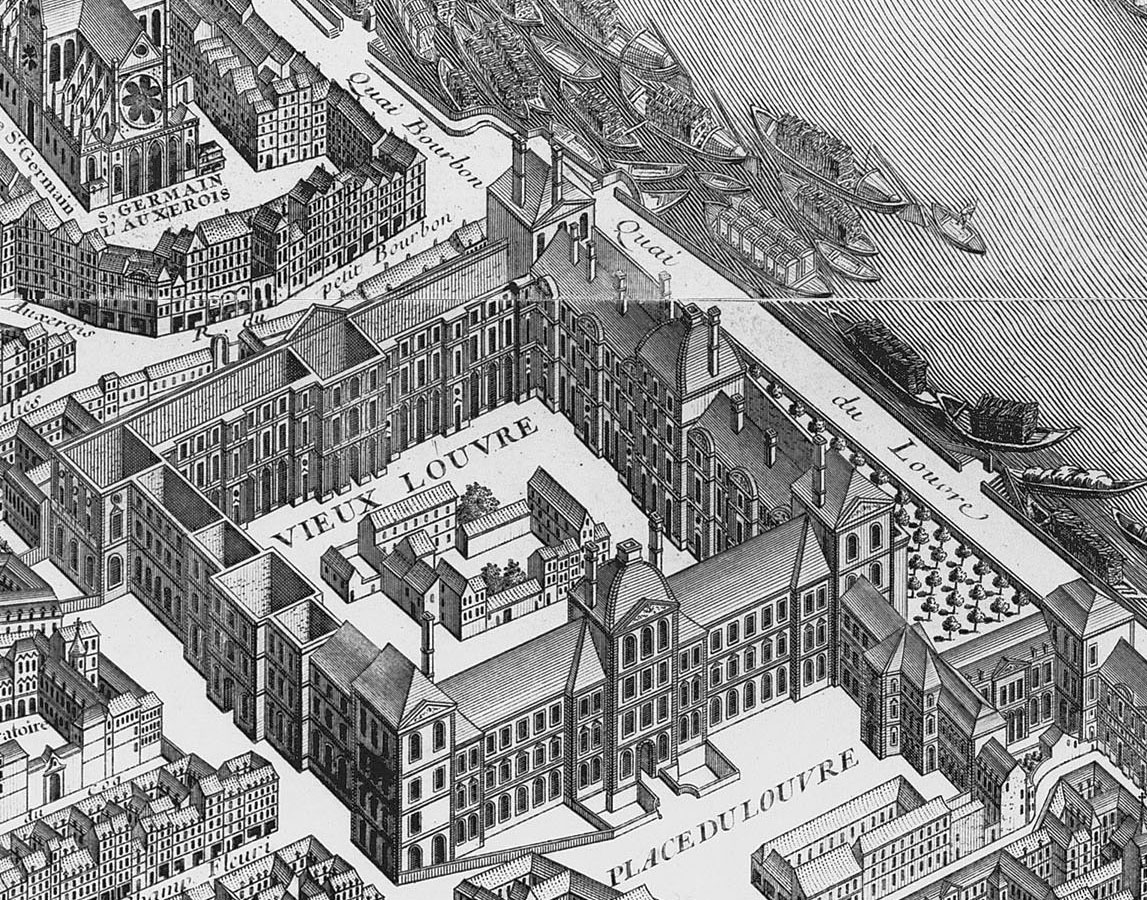
The Louvre on the 1739 Turgot map of Paris, showing the parts which remained unroofed

The Académie d'Architecture was suppressed in 1793, but later revived and merged in 1816 into the Académie des Beaux-Arts, together with the Académie de Peinture et de Sculpture (Academy of Painting and Sculpture, founded 1648) and the Académie de Musique (Academy of Music, founded in 1669). In addition, the traditions of the Académie d'Architecture were maintained and spread by the architecture section of the École des Beaux-Arts up to 1968, when the French government completely reorganized architectural education.

The Académie des Beaux-Arts is now one of the five academies of the Institut de France.

== Design competitions ==
From 1720 to 1968, the Académie Royale d'Architecture and its successors held annual competitions for the Grand Prix de Rome in architecture. The winner was typically required to study for several years at the Académie de France in Rome. In 1763 Jacques-François Blondel established less ambitious monthly competitions, which encouraged students to devote more time to their school work during their time in their supervisor's studios.

== Members ==
The eight members upon the academy's founding in 1671 were:

- François Blondel, professor and director,
- André Félibien, secretary
- Libéral Bruant, architect
- Daniel Gittard, architect
- Antoine Lepautre, architect
- François Le Vau, architect
- Pierre II Mignard, architect
- François d'Orbay, architect

Subsequent edicts of the crown increased the membership. By 1793 there were 33 members, divided into two classes, plus a third consisting of correspondents living in the French provinces and in foreign countries.

Later members included:

- Claude Perrault (1613–1688), elected member 1673
- Jules Hardouin-Mansart (1646–1708), elected member 1675
- André Le Nôtre (1613–1700)), elected member 1681
- Pierre Bullet (1639–1716), elected member 1685
- Philippe de La Hire (1640–1718), elected member and professor 1687
- Robert de Cotte (1656–1735), elected member 1687, director 1687 or 1699
- Antoine Desgodetz (1653–1728), elected member 1698, second class 1699, first class 1718, and professor 1719
- Jacques Gabriel (1667–1742), elected member 1699, director 1736
- Jean-François Blondel (1683–1756), elected second-class member 1728
- Ange-Jacques Gabriel (1698–1782), elected member 1728, director 1743
- Jacques-François Blondel (1705–1774), elected second-class member 1755, professor 1762
- Antoine Matthieu Le Carpentier (1709–1773), elected member 1756
- Étienne-Louis Boullée (1728–1799), elected second-class member 1762, promoted to first-class 1780
- Claude-Nicolas Ledoux (1736–1806), elected second-class member 1773
- Richard Mique (1728–1794), elected member 1775, director 1783

== Documentation ==
From 1911 to 1929, the French art historian Henry Lemonnier published the proceedings of the academy in ten volumes with the title Procès-verbaux de l'Académie royale d'architecture 1671–1793:

- Vol. 1 (1671–1681)
- Vol. 2 (1682–1696)
- Vol. 3 (1697– 1711)
- Vol. 4 (1712–1726)
- Vol. 5 (1727–1743)
- Vol. 6 (1744–1758)
- Vol. 7 (1759–1767)
- Vol. 8 (1768–1779)
- Vol. 9 (1780–1793)
- Vol. 10 (Table générale)

== See also ==
- Architecture of Paris
- French art salons and academies

== Bibliography ==
- Blondel, Jacques-François (1756). Architecture françoise, vol. 4, book 6. Paris: Charles-Antoine Jombert. Copy at Gallica; copy at Kyoto University Library.
- Cleary, Richard (1996). "Paris, VI. Institutions, 2. Académie Royale d'Architecture", vol. 24, pp. 169–171, in The Dictionary of Art, 34 volumes, edited by Jane Turner. New York: Grove. ISBN 9781884446009. Also available at Oxford Art Online (subscription required).
- Harrington, Kevin (1982). "Blondel, Jean François", vol. 1, pp. 234–236, in Macmillan Encyclopedia of Architects, four volumes, edited by Adolf K. Placzek. London: The Free Press. ISBN 0-02-925000-5.
- Le Bas, Philippe, editor (1840). France. Dictionnaire encyclopédique, volume 1 (A–Az). Paris: Didot Frères. See the article "Académie d'architecture", pp. 82–85 (at Google Books).
- Lemonnier, Henry ([1929]). Procès-verbaux de l'académie royale d'architecture. Tome X: Table générale. Paris: Armand Colin. OCLC 491723214. Copy at Internet Archive.
