= Jacques-François Blondel =

French architect and teacher (1705–1774)

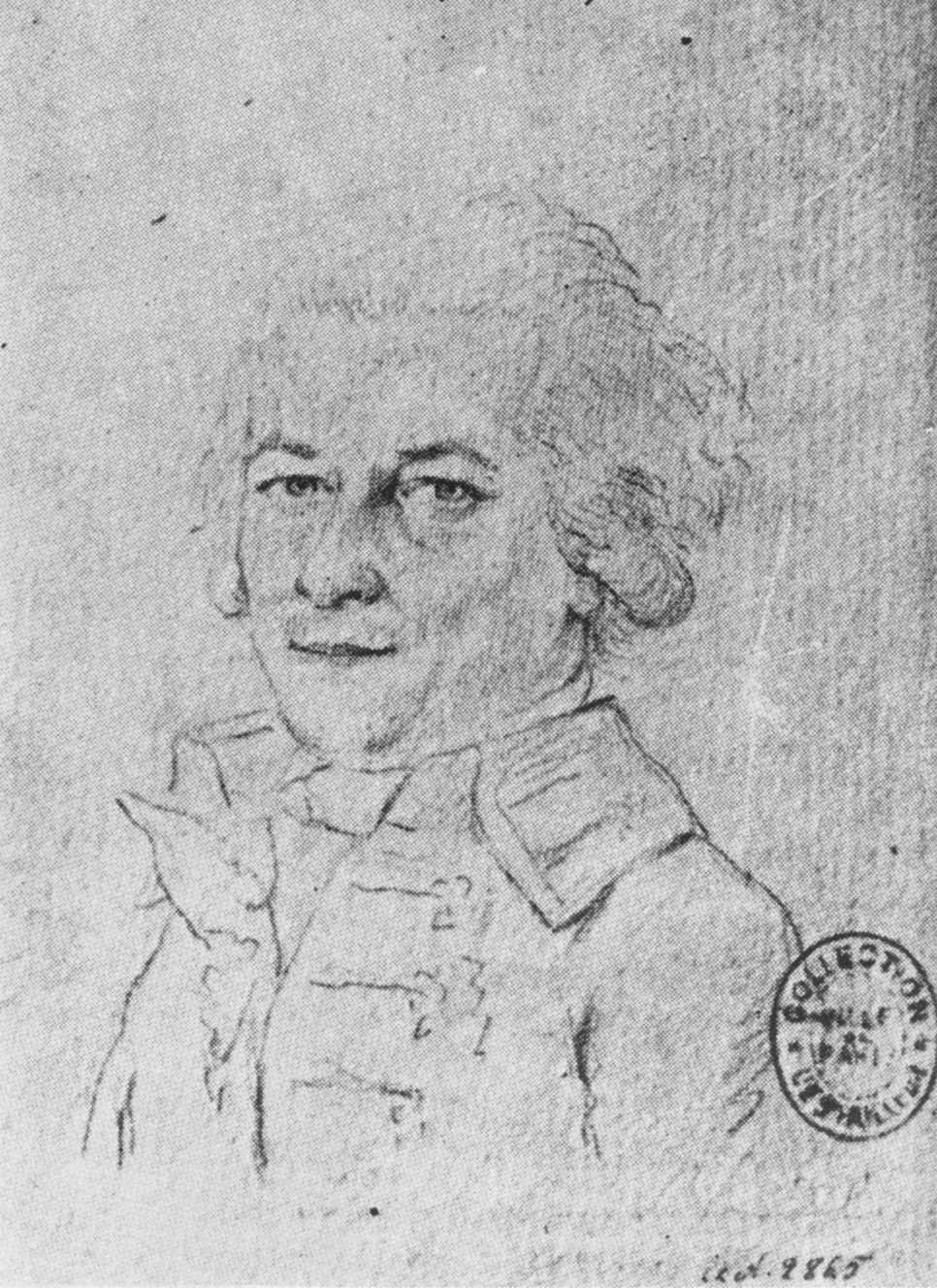
- Blondel in a c. 1760 illustration
- Born: 8 January 1705; Rouen, France
- Died: 9 January 1774 (aged 69); Paris, France
- Occupation: Architect
- Spouses: Marie Anne Garnier; Manon Balletti
- Practice: Neoclassicism

Jacques-François Blondel (French: [ʒak fʁɑ̃swa blɔ̃dɛl]; 8 January 1705 – 9 January 1774) was an 18th-century French architect and teacher. After running his own highly successful school of architecture for many years, he was appointed Professor of Architecture at the Académie Royale d'Architecture in 1762, and his Cours d'architecture ("Course of Architecture", 1771–1777) largely superseded a similarly titled book published in 1675 by his famous namesake, François Blondel, who had occupied the same post in the late 17th century.

== Career ==
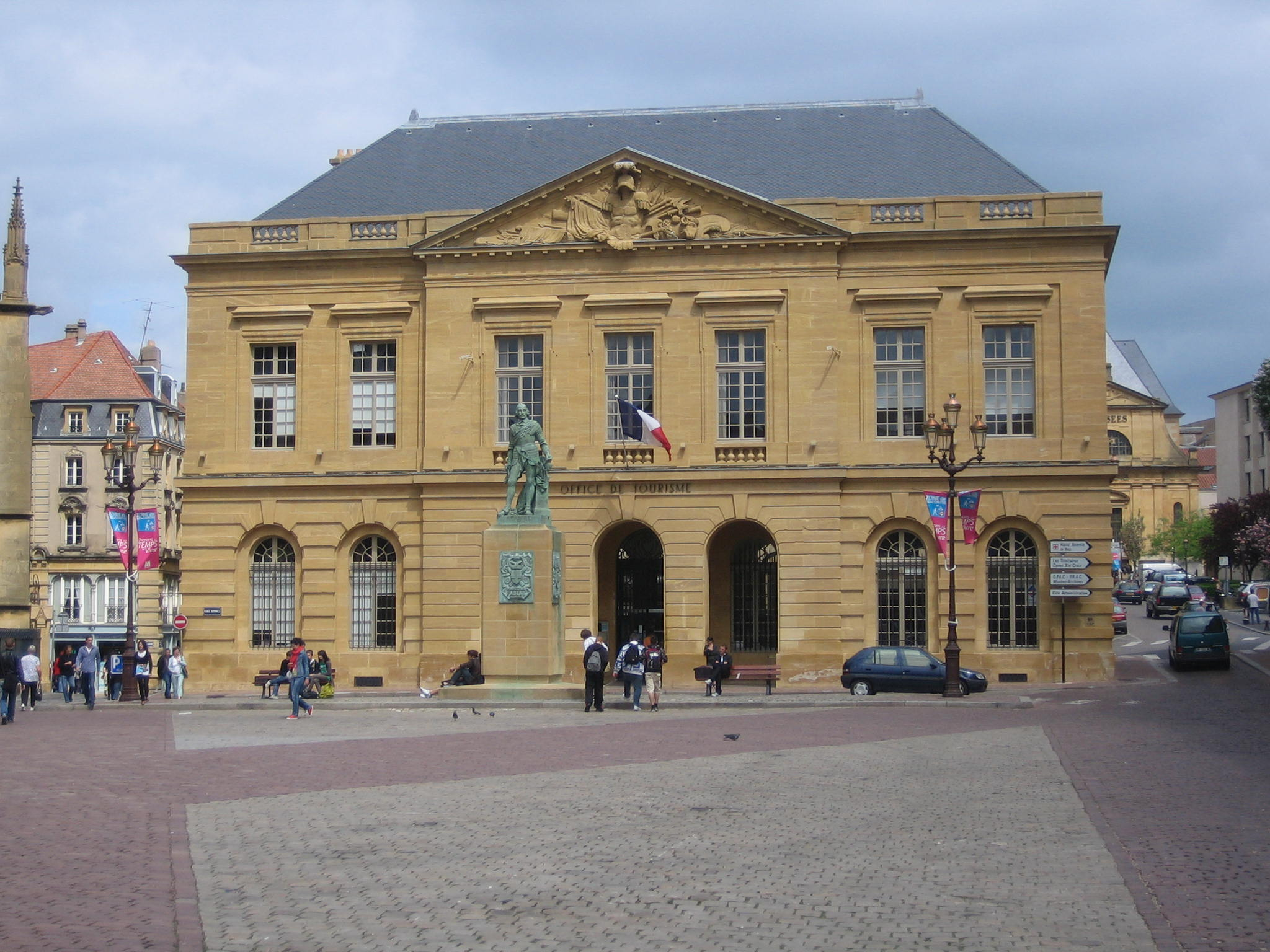
Building on the town square of Metz, work of Jacques-François Blondel.

Born in Rouen, he initially trained under his uncle Jean-François Blondel (1683–1756), architect of Rouen. Jacques-François was in Paris by 1726 and continued his studies with Gilles-Marie Oppenord, from whom he acquired a knowledge of rococo. He also worked with Jean Mariette, contributing to the latter's L'Architecture françoise (1727, 1738), as a writer and as an architectural engraver. Blondel developed into a conservative and thorough architect, whose rationally ordered mind consolidated French classical tradition and practice.

His first independent publication was the hugely influential encyclopedic work, De la Distribution des Maisons de Plaisance, et de la Décoration des Edifices en General, issued at Paris, 1737–38. It contained 155 carefully engraved plates. His Distribution des Maisons de Plaisance and other engraved work attracted a commission to produce thirteen of the engravings for the festival book commemorating the fêtes that celebrated the wedding of Madame Elizabeth of France with Dom Philippe of Spain, published in 1740.

That same year he opened his own private school in Paris, the École des Arts, sanctioned by the Académie in 1743. In the ensuing years a long sequence of architects profited from his discourse: Boullée, Brongniart, Chalgrin, La Guêpière, Desprez, de Wailly, Gondoin, Ledoux, Guimard and Rondelet, and to foreigners who would bring Neoclassicism home with them: the Anglo-Swedish Sir William Chambers, and the Dane Caspar Frederik Harsdorff. "Blondel was the most significant French architectural educator of the eighteenth century.....his objective was to establish design principles for domestic architecture that correspond to the classical principles already in practice for civil structures".

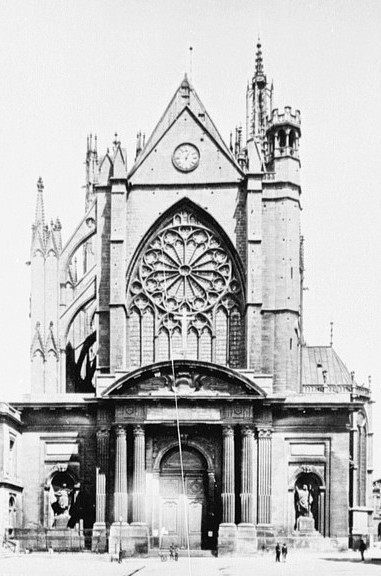
West portal of the cathedral in Metz, designed by Blondel in 1764, replaced in 1887

In his clear and rational Architecture françoise, a four-volume work published from 1752 to 1756, he covered the past century and more of French buildings in and near Paris, setting them in their historical context and providing a wealth of detailed information that would otherwise have been lost. In the preface, he remarked, "I have used simple terms and a popular style with the intention of being understood by layman and artist alike; having noticed that recent books about architecture are either badly organised or overlong." He originally planned eight volumes, but only the first four were published. The work brought him to official notice; he was inducted into the Académie Royale d'Architecture in 1755 and appointed architect to Louis XV.

Though his executed body of work was small, mostly confined to work he executed at Metz under commission of the duc de Choiseul, his approach was soundly grounded: for Diderot's Encyclopédie he wrote the article on masonry, as well as architecture, and contributed nearly 500 articles between 1751 and his death in 1774.

In 1762, he was appointed Professor of Architecture at the Académie, closing his own school and introducing his comprehensive curriculum to the Académie. His Cours d'architecture ou traité de la décoration, distribution et constructions des bâtiments contenant les leçons données en 1750, et les années suivantes began appearing in 1771 and ran to nine volumes by 1777, a volume of plates to each two volumes of text; the last volumes were seen through the press by his disciple Pierre Patte. His Cours d'architecture is sometimes referred to as the "Petit Blondel" to distinguish it from the "Grand Blondel", his Architecture françoise. Blondel's practical, encyclopedic approach, largely ignoring the excesses of Rococo, had survived changes in taste and remained in the mainstream of French architectural training for several decades more.

== Personal life ==
Blondel married Marie Anne Garnier in 1729. Their son, Georges-François Blondel, who was born in 1730, became an architectural engraver. They also had a daughter, Claudine Angelique. After his first wife's death in 1755, Jacques-François married Manon Balletti in 1760. Their son, Jean-Baptiste Blondel, who later became an architect for the city of Paris, was born in 1764. During his final illness, Jacques-François requested to be taken to his classrooms at the Louvre, where he died surrounded by his books, his architectural models, and his students.
