= Daniel Gittard =

French architect

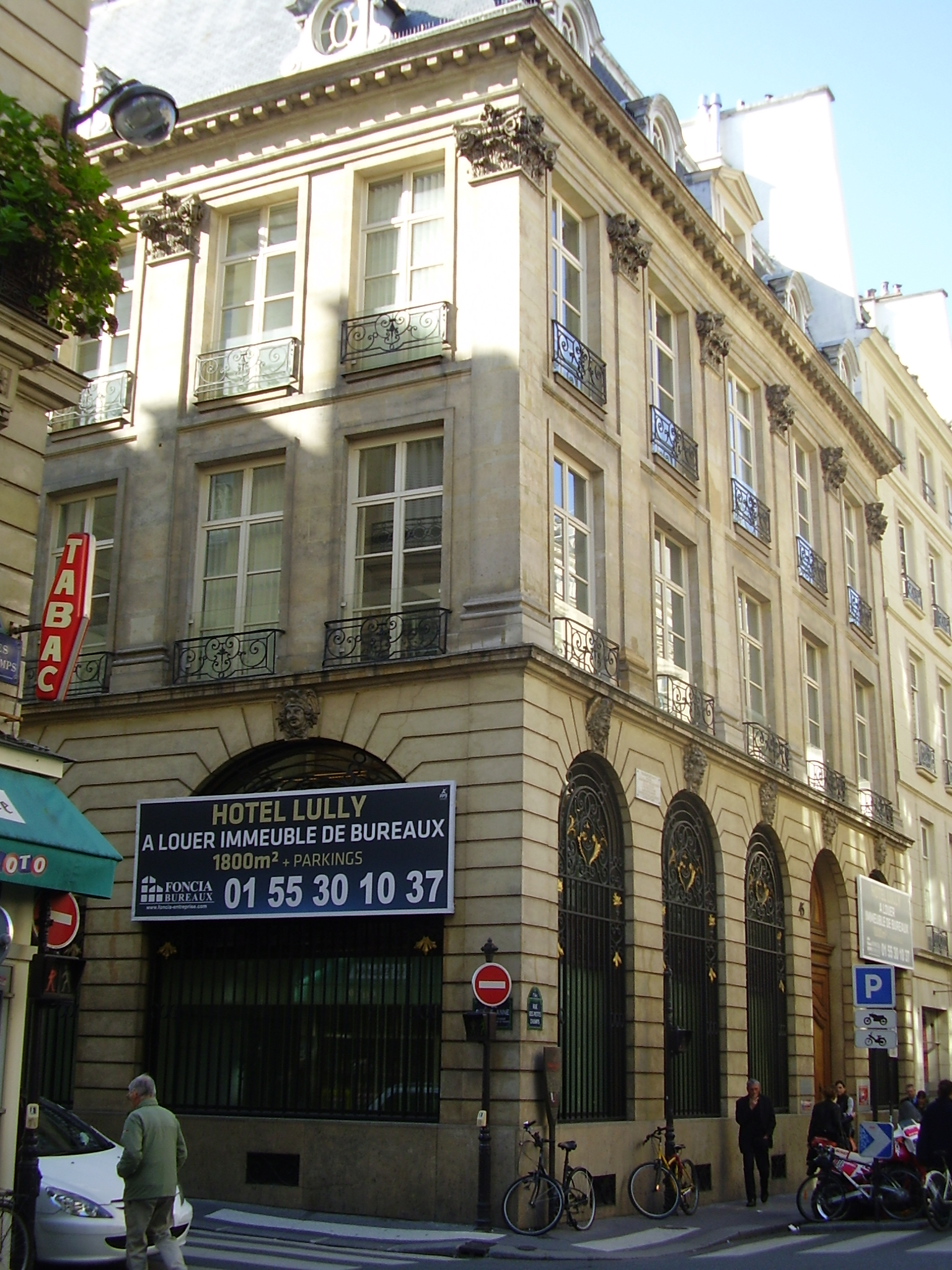
Hôtel Lully, Paris

Daniel Gittard (March 14, 1625, in Blandy-les-Tours – December 15, 1686, in Paris) was a French architect.

In 1671, he became one of the first eight members of the Académie royale d'architecture created by Louis XIV.

== Biography ==
A student of Louis Le Vau, Daniel Gittard was appointed “architect to the king” at the age of 30. He was involved in the construction of several Parisian mansions and religious buildings: the Oratory novitiate (1655), the convent and church of the Benedictines of the Blessed Sacrament (1658), and the Church of Saint-Sulpice (1660).

He also worked on the foundations and gardens of Vaux-le-Vicomte.

In Chantilly, working on behalf of the Louis, Grand Condé, he designed the Grand Degré under the direction of André Le Nôtre and collaborated with Jules Hardouin-Mansart on the renovation of the château.

In 1669, having been appointed “engineer and architect of the King's buildings,” he served as godfather to the daughter of Michel Boissart, a master sculptor in Paris.

In 1671, he was one of the first members of the Académie royale d'architecture, which Louis XIV had just established.

His son, Pierre Gittard (1665–1746), was an architect and engineer to the king.
