= Francis William Blagdon =

English journalist and author

Francis William Blagdon (bapt. 19 January 1777 – 24 December 1818) was an English journalist and author.

== Life ==
Blagdon began his career as a newsboy for The Sun newspaper. He then became amanuensis to Dr. Anthony Florian Madinger Willich, a medical writer, who taught him French and German; he also learned Spanish and Italian.

Blagdon became associated with the Morning Post, which he helped to edit for some years. The paper was then Tory in its views, and Blagdon took a polemical line. He was imprisoned for six months in 1805, for libeling John Jervis, Earl St. Vincent as a naval administrator.

In 1809, Blagdon came into conflict with William Cobbett, and in October of that year he published a prospectus, perhaps not intended seriously, of "Blagdon's Weekly Political Register", which was to commence The History of the Political Life and Writings of Cobbett, who was compared to Catiline. As a Sunday anti-Cobbett paper, Blagdon's Register was subsidised by the government, as was a similar effort of Lewis Goldsmith. Financial speculation ruined him. The Phœnix, another of his ventures, soon came to an end. He died of consumption in Smith Square, Westminster, on Christmas Eve 1818, and was buried on 2 January 1819 at St Margaret's, Westminster. A subscription was raised for his destitute widow and children.

== Works ==
At one time Blagdon published a French Interpreter, possibly no copy being extant. In 1802, he began editing a series of Modern Discoveries (London, 1802–3, 8 vols.); the first two volumes were Vivant Denon's Travels in Egypt in the train of Napoleon Bonaparte; the next two included Sylvain Meinrad Xavier de Golbéry's Travels in Africa (in the Maghreb) and the remaining four were devoted to Peter Simon Pallas's Travels in the Southern Provinces of Russia. The works were translated by Blagdon from the French and German; Pallas's Travels was then translated for a second time by Blagdon, and a new edition published in 1812 (London, 2 vols., with illustrations).

In 1803, Blagdon began publishing with the Rev. Francis Prevost a literary miscellany, Flowers of Literature, which ran to seven volumes (London, 1803–9). The same year he also published, with Prevost, Mooriana, or Selections from the ... Works .. . of Dr. John Moore (London, 2 vols.)

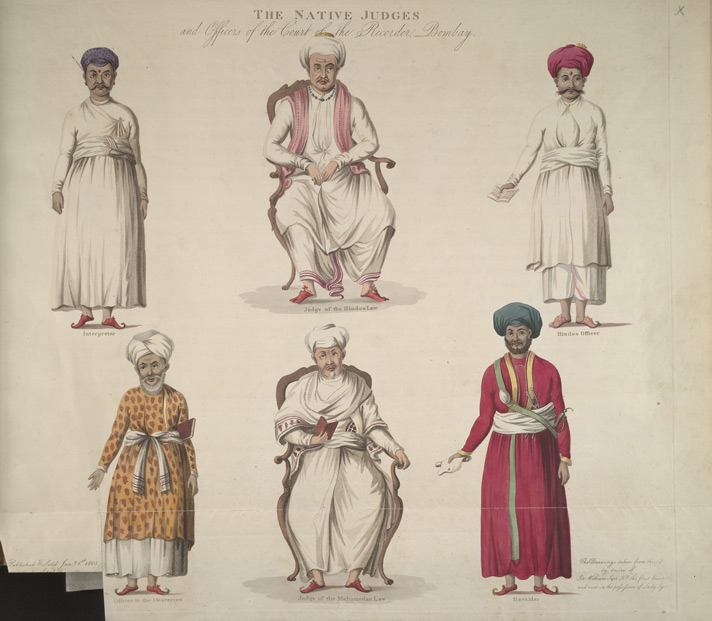
The Native Judges, illustration from A Brief History of Ancient and Modern India (1805) by Francis William Blagdon

In 1805 Blagdon brought out A Brief History of Ancient and Modern India (London, 3 vols). It was based on a collection of aquatints by Edward Orme, after William Daniell, James Hunter, and Francis Swain Ward. It was reissued in 1813 as an appendix to Captain Thomas Williamson's European in India (London). In 1806 he contributed the Memoirs to Orme's Graphic History of the Life, Exploits, and Death of Lord Nelson.

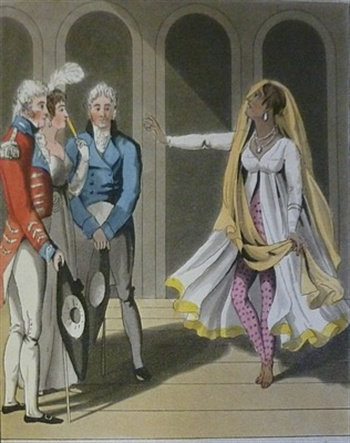
Plate from The European in India (1813)

The proposals of the Whig ministry of 1806 on Catholic emancipation induced Blagdon to publish an edition of Foxe's Book of Martyrs; it appeared as An Universal History of Christian Martyrdom . . . originally composed by John Fox . . . and now entirely rewritten ... by the Rev. J. Milner, M. A. (London, 1807). The use of the pseudonym "the Rev. J. Milner" travestied the Roman Catholic priest John Milner. Again on the topic of Catholic emancipation, in 1810, and again pseudonymous, "Catholic Emancipation discussed and exploded! An historical and political view of the Catholic religion ... In a series of letters to ... Lord Grenville from Albion. Subsequent editions of Blagdon's work appeared in 1817, 1837, 1848, 1863, 1871, and in 1881; and in 1892 was published a version by Theodore Alois Buckley, described as "abridged from Milner's edition".

In 1812 Blagdon contributed to Francophobia with The Situation of Great Britain in 1811, translated from the French of M. de Montgaillard (London); this evoked a reply from John Jervis White Jervis, who described Blagdon as "a gentleman well known in the walks of literary knowledge and of loyal authors". In 1814 Blagdon published An Historical Memento ... of the public Rejoicings ... in celebration of the Peace of 1814, and of the Centenary of the Accession of the House of Brunswick (London), and in 1819 a New Dictionary of Classical Quotations (London, 1819).

Blagdon was also author of:

- The Grand Contest ... or a View of the Causes and Probable Consequences of the threatened Invasion of Great Britain, 1803.
- Remarks on a Pamphlet entitled "Observations on the Concise Statement of Facts by Sir Home Popham," 1805.
- Authentic Memoirs of George Morland, 1806; this contains many engravings of Morland's pictures.
- The Modern Geographer, 1807.
- Langhorne's Fables of Flora . . . with a Life of the Author, 1812.
- Letters of the Princess of Wales, comprising the only true History of the celebrated "Book," 1813; on Princess Caroline of Brunswick.

He contributed a life of Samuel Johnson with an edition of his poems to The Laurel (London, 1808); and compiled a general index to the British Critic, vols, xxi–xlii. To him is attributed Paris as it was, and as it is (London, 1803).

== Notes ==
Attribution This article incorporates text from a publication now in the public domain: Lee, Sidney, ed. (1901). "Blagdon, Francis William". Dictionary of National Biography (1st supplement). Vol. 1. London: Smith, Elder & Co.
