= Antoine de Léris =

French journalist and drama critic

Antoine de Léris (Mont-Louis, Roussillon, 28 February 1723 — 1795) was a French journalist and drama critic of the 18th century and a historian of the French theatre, author of the Dictionnaire portatif historique et littéraire des théâtres, contenant l'origine des differens théâtres de Paris, ("Portable historical and literary dictionary of theatres, containing the origins of the various theatres of Paris"), published without the author's name on the title page by Jombert in Paris in 1754.The corrected and augmented second edition, 1763, is a standard work of theatre history, a "library" of information. "Léris is accounted by many commentators very nearly the equal of François and Claude Parfaict when it comes to painstaking accuracy and responsible commentary," William Brooks observes.

Antoine de Léris supported himself as a man of letters with a sinecure purchased at the Chambre des comptes, as premier huissier ("first usher"). Collaborating with abbé Marc-Antoine Laugier and Antoine Jacques Labbet, abbé de Morambert, he edited the first French review of music, Sentiment d'un harmonophile sur différents ouvrages de musique ("Views of a lover of harmony on different works of music") "Amsterdam", i.e. Paris:Jombert, 1756.

Léris has been credited as the anonymous author of La géographie rendu aisée, ou traitée méthodique pour apprendre la géographie ("Geography rendered easy, or methodical treaty for learning geography"), Paris, 1753.

He also took part in Après-soupers de la campagne ou, Recueil d'Histoires courrantes et amusantes ("Country after-dinner evenings, or collection of current and amusing tales"), 1759 and 1764. Friedrich Melchior Grimm didn't think much of the second collection: "The author claims that the public received his work with indulgence. If perfect oblivion may so be called, the author is right to be grateful".
