= Parfait (disambiguation) =

Parfait is a food. Parfait may also refer to:

- Cathar Perfect (also called Parfait), a religious leader among the Cathars
- Parfait (album), a 1982 album by bassist Ron Carter
