= Nicolas de Blégny =

French essayist (1652–1722)

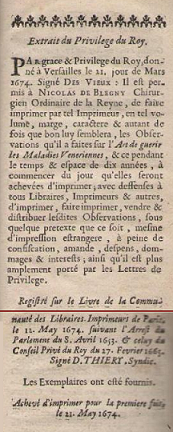
Extract from King Louis XIV's privilege dated 1674, in fine of the book L'art de guérir les maladies vénériennes

Nicolas de Blégny (1652–1722) was a French essayist, historian and barber surgeon. He was appointed surgeon of Queen Maria Theresa of Spain in 1678, then physician of King Louis XIV in 1682.

He published many works, which earned him some violent reviews, on various medical subjects and on coffee, tea and chocolate, such as Le bon usage du thé, du caffé et du chocolat pour la preservation & pour la guerison des maladies in 1662.

He was also the founder of the first medical journal, the Nouvelles découvertes sur toutes les parties de la médecine, as early as 1679, though to begin with it simply reported the transactions of his society, the Academy of Recent Discoveries in Medicine. They were published after three years as a collection, Zodiacus Medico-Gallicus. He also published Le livre commode des adresses de Paris pour 1692 under the pseudonym Abraham du Pradel.

He was arrested in 1693 for some wrongdoing and died in disgrace in 1722 in Avignon. He was the brother of Étienne de Blégny, who wrote several books on correct handwriting.

== Bibliography ==
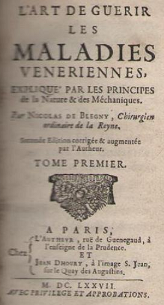
Nicolas de Blegny, first page of L'art de guérir les maladies vénériennes 1677

=== Books by this author ===
L'Art de guérir les maladies vénériennes, Paris, at the author and Jean Dhoury. 1677
Nouvelles découvertes sur toutes les parties de la médecine, Paris. 1679
La Doctrine des Rapports de Chirurgie, Lyon, at Thomas Amaulry and Denis Nion's widow. 1684. Very rare. 1684
L'Esprit des autres. 5th edition reworked and expanded. 1 vol. in-18.
Le Livre commode des Adresses de Paris, 2 volumes. 1691
Secrets concernant la beauté et la santé, published in Paris by Laurent d'Houry and at Denis Nion's widow. 1688

=== Books about this author ===
- J. Tellier, Un aventurier médical au XVIIe: Nicolas de Blégny, Paris, Louis Arnette, 1932, 8°, 68 p. Thesis.
- Paris, Bibliothèque inter-universitaire de pharmacie, Archives, Carton N / Affaires concernant Nicolas de Blégny, médecin du Roy.
- Albert G. Nicholls, "Nicolas de Blégny and the first medical periodical", The Canadian Medical Association Journal, August 1934, (pp. 198-202).
- Jules Guiart, "La Chronique du Fureteur : Nicolas de Blégny, créateur du journalisme médical", in Le Fureteur Médical, n° 1, January 1944
