= François Parfaict =

French theatre historian

François Parfaict (10 May 1698 in Paris – 25 October 1753) was an 18th-century French theatre historian. His brother was Claude Parfaict (1701–1777), also a theatre historian. Their most notable works were collaborations, including Histoire du théâtre françois depuis son origine jusqu’à présent (15 volumes, 1734-1749) and Dictionnaire des théâtres de Paris (7 volumes, 1756).

== Works ==
- Le Dénouement imprévu, comedy, with Marivaux, 1724, in-12
- La Fausse suivante ou le Fourbe puni, comedy, 1724, in-12
- Le Quart-d’heure amusant, January–May 1727, in-12
- Étrennes calotines, par le sieur Perd-la-raison, 1729
- Notes de l’édition des Bains des Thermopyles par Mlle Scudéry, 1730, in-12
- Aurore et Phœbus, 1734, in-12
- Agenda historique et chronologique des théâtres de Paris pour l’année 1735, in-24
- Histoire générale du Théâtre français depuis son origine jusqu’à présent, 1734-1749, with his brother Claude, 15 vol. in-12 (The book was slowly published; the titles of the first volumes were remade in 1745, or reprinted. Moreri in 1759 incorrectly gives 18 volumes to the work. The fifteenth, last to be published, ends with the year 1721. This is the result of enormous research, and yet leaves much to be desired. Leduchat (Ducatiana, (p. 175-6) provides an example that gives reason to believe that the Parfaict brothers were not accurate in their quotes.
- Mémoires pour servir à l’histoire des spectacles de la Foire par un acteur forain, with the same, 1743, 2 vol. in-12 (read online)
- Histoire de l’ancien théâtre Italien, depuis son origine jusqu’à sa suppression en l’année 1697, with the same, 1753, in-12
- Dictionnaire des Théâtres de Paris, with the same, 1756 ou 1767, 7 vol. in-12, of which the seventh is titled Additions et Corrections (read online)

(This work was completed and published by a certain Abguebre. This is a very large repository of information, but less accurate and less methodical than the Dictionnaire by Léris which, however, has only one volume. Voltaire himself wrote the article about him in the Parfaict brothers' Dictionnaire. The seventh volume doesn't reach the 20 August 1755.

- Panurge, ballet comique in trois acts, 1803, in-8 °(The editor was Jacques-Julien-Moutonnet Clairfons, who added a preface and a small writing of his way against Étienne Morel de Chédeville.

François Parfaict also left a manuscript for a Histoire de l’Opéra, which didn't appear, and a lyric tragedy entitled Atrée. He published the Œuvres de Boindin, 1753, 2 vol. in- 12.

== Sources ==
- Joseph-François Michaud, Louis-Gabriel Michaud, Référence:Biographie universelle ancienne et moderne : histoire par ordre alphabétique de la vie publique et privée de tous les hommes (Michaud), Paris, Michaud frères, t. 32, 1822, (p. 563-4); 1843 edition: vol. 32, p. 132.
- James R. Anthony (2001), "Parfaict, François", Grove Music Online (subscription, Wikilibrary access, or UK public library membership required).
