= Claude Parfaict =

French theatre historian (c. 1701 – 1777)

Claude Parfaict (Paris, c. 1701 – 26 June 1777) was a French theatre historian.

== Career ==
François Parfaict's younger brother, Claude, had the same passion for the theatre as his brother. Claude's most notable works were collaborations with François, including the Histoire du théâtre françois depuis son origine jusqu’à présent (15 volumes, 1734–1749) and the Dictionnaire des théâtres de Paris (7 volumes, 1756). He also undertook on his own a Dramaturgie générale, ou Dictionnaire dramatique universel, a project that he did not implement.

Through protection by Madame de Pompadour, Claude Parfaict obtained a twelve-hundred-livres pension from which he benefited until his death.

The Chevalier du Coudray, who had the Lettre au public, sur la mort de MM. de Crébillon (fils), Gresset, et Parfaict printed in 1777, later added an essay against the actors, entitled Il est temps de parler, and said it was by Parfaict. Nothing proves its authenticity and reading that piece raises suspicion that Coudray composed it himself.

But the Lettre d'Hippocrate sur la prétendue folie de Démocrite, was indeed translated from Greek by Claude Parfaict, 1780, in-12.

== See also ==
- List of French historians

== Sources ==
- Joseph-François Michaud, Louis-Gabriel Michaud, Référence:Biographie universelle ancienne et moderne : histoire par ordre alphabétique de la vie publique et privée de tous les hommes (Michaud), Paris, Michaud frères, 1811 edition: vol. 32 (1822), (p. 563-4); 1843 edition: vol. 32, p. 133.
- James R. Anthony (2001), "Parfaict, François", Grove Music Online (subscription, Wikilibrary access, or UK public library membership required).
