= Pierre Bullet =

French architect (1639–1716

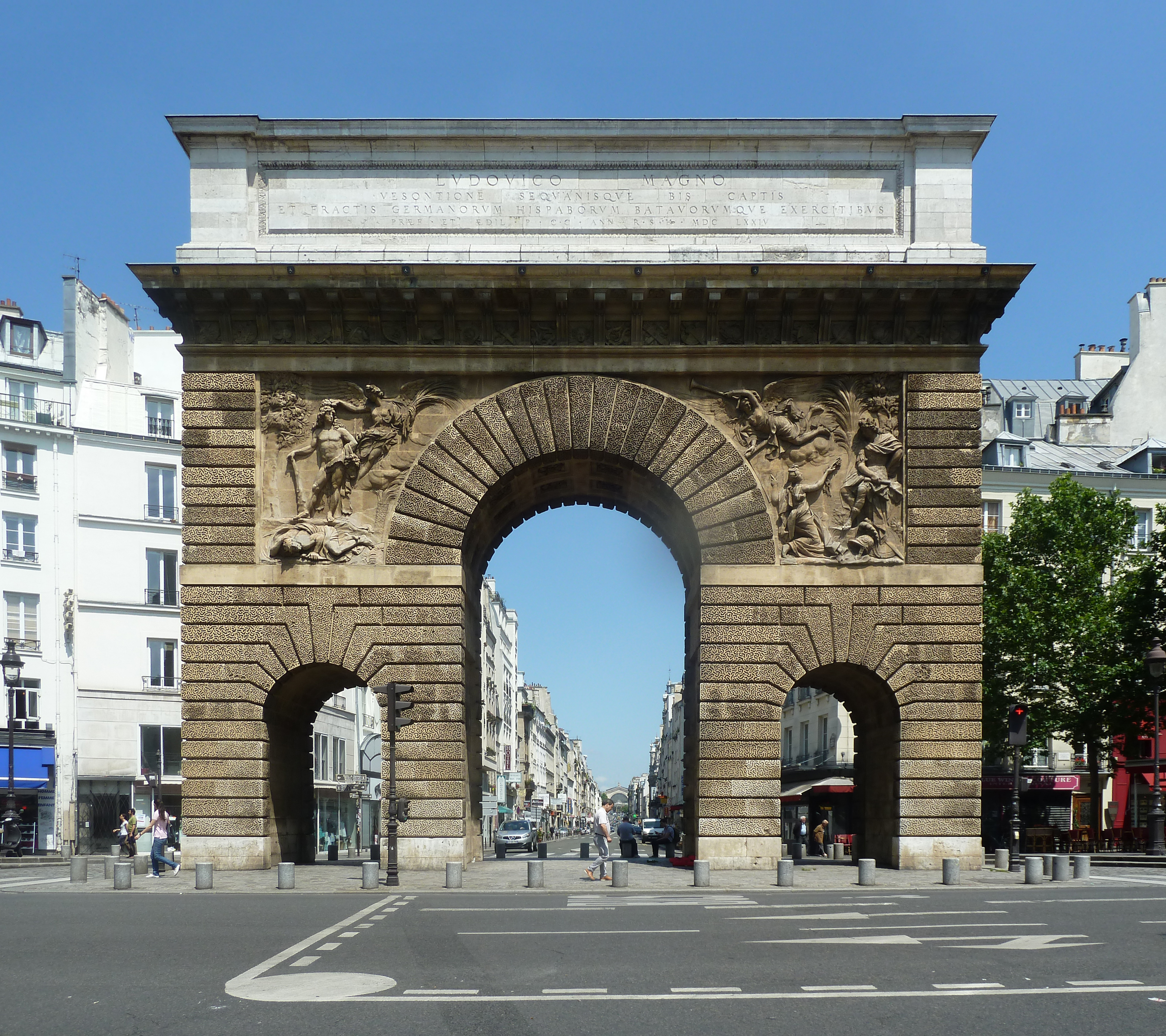
The Porte Saint-Martin, Bullet's most important work

Pierre Bullet (French pronunciation: [pjɛʁ bylɛ]; c. 1639 – 1716) was a French architect. He was one of the students of François Blondel and became a member of the Académie Royale d'Architecture in 1685. Among his works are the Château de Champs-sur-Marne and the Porte Saint-Martin.

== Early life and training ==
Pierre Bullet's father, Martin Bullet (active in 1608, died after 1639), was a master builder in Paris. At an early age, Pierre Bullet became a student of François Blondel, who was more a theoretician, while Bullet was described as an expert dessinateur et apparailleur (draftsman and equipment operator).

== Architectural work ==
Bullet directed the construction work of the Porte Saint-Denis, built according to the plans and drawings of Blondel, in 1672. Two years later, in 1674, he provided the plans for the Porte Saint-Martin and directed the work. The French architectural historian Maurice Du Seigneur wrote: "This monument is the most important work that Bullet left us; of less grandiose proportions than the Porte Saint-Denis, the Porte Saint-Martin presents a very remarkable aspect of decorative simplicity."

In 1675, he made the high altar of the church of the Sorbonne, as well as the decoration of the two chapels of the transept of the church of Saint-Germain des Prés.

Between 1676 and 1679, he was in charge of the construction work of the Quai Pelletier; in 1676 he designed a Doric door, to serve as an entrance to the building of the pump on the Pont Notre-Dame.

In 1681, he studied the preliminary project of the church of the general novitiate of the Reformed Dominicans; the first stone of this building was laid on 5 March 1683, and the work continued, under the direction of Bullet, who was not to see his work completed. It was not until 1770 that Brother Claude, a Dominican, built the portal of this church which today bears the name of Saint-Thomas-d'Aquin.

From 1684 to 1687, he had the old Saint-Michel fountain built, now destroyed.

He was admitted to the Royal Academy of Architecture on 23 February 1685.

From 1700 to 1702, he built the Hôtel Crozat and the Hôtel du Comte d'Evreux on Place Vendôme; in 1710, the Hôtel de Brancas on Rue de Tournon.

Pierre Bullet was also the architect of a large number of other Parisian hotels, the Hôtel de Tallard, rue des Enfants Rouges (now rue des Archives); that of the banker Jabach (Hôtel Jabach), rue neuve Saint-Merry; the Hôtel Amelot, rue du Grand-Chantier [fr]; and the Hôtel Le Pelletier (now part of the Musée Carnavalet), rue Culture Sainte-Catherine.

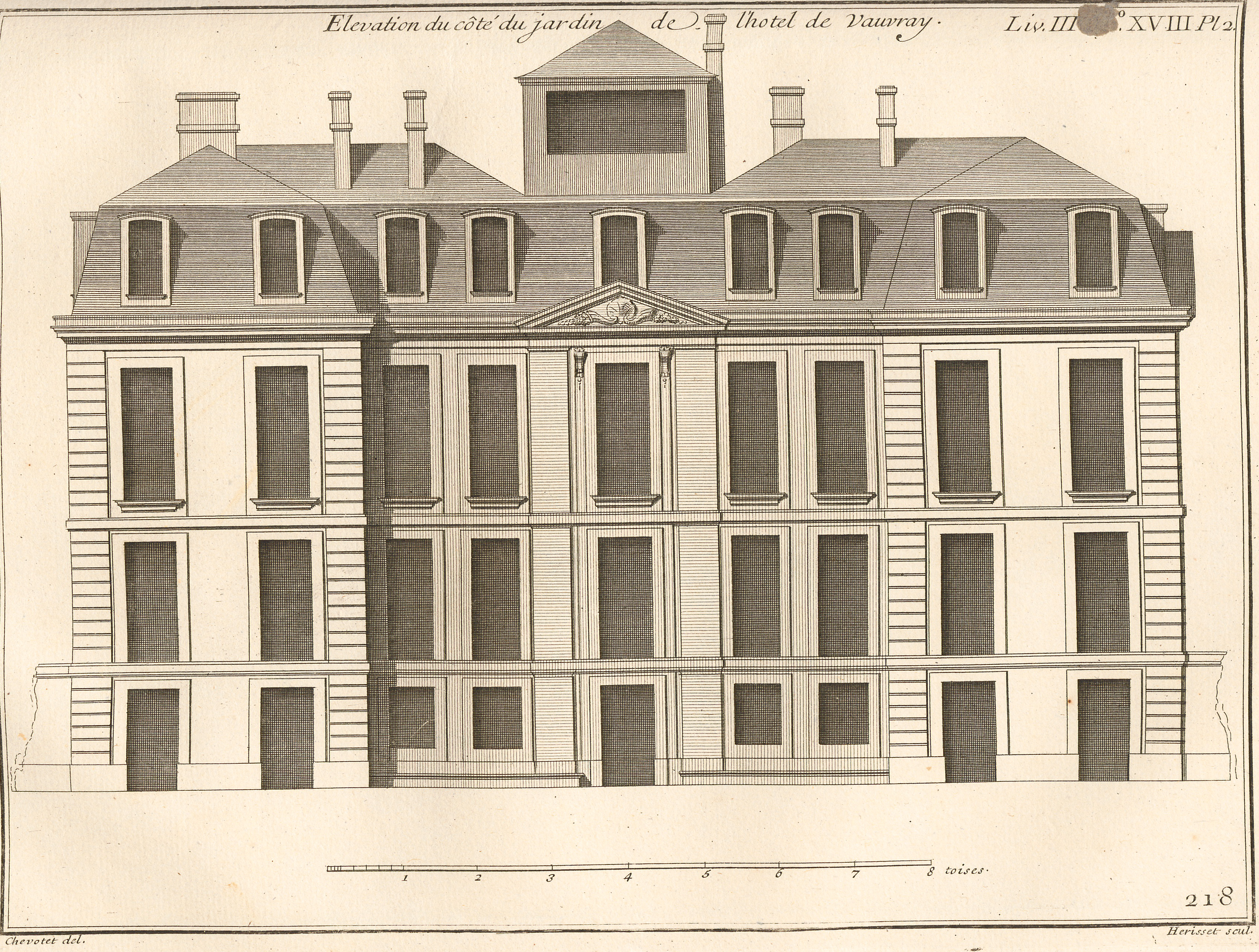
Garden façade of the Hôtel de Vauvray, engraved by Antoine Hérisset after a drawing by Jean-Michel Chevotet

He also designed the Hôtel de Vauvray (now Hôtel de Magny in the Jardin des Plantes), rue de Seine (now rue Cuvier). In the 19th century, this Vauvray hotel served as a residence for the director of the Museum of Natural History; its plans and elevation are engraved in volume II of Jacques-François Blondel's Architecture française.

In collaboration with Jacques Gabriel, Bullet had embellishment work carried out in the Hôtel de La Force, rue du Roi-de-Sicile; with the help of Germain Boffrand, he decorated the Hôtel d'Avaux that Pierre Le Muet had built around 1660.

He is also responsible for the construction of the Château d'Issy, for the Princess of Conti, and for the avant-corps of the episcopal palace in Bourges. In the church of Montmorency he erected the tomb of Anne de Montmorency. He made notable modifications to the plans of the convent buildings of Saint-Martin-des-Champs.

Architectural drawings by Pierre Bullet

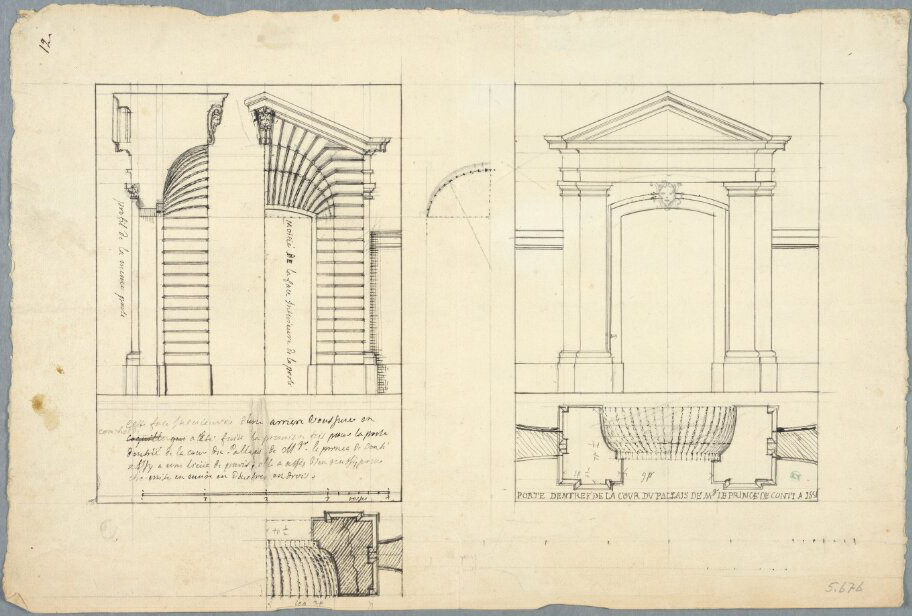
Entrance portal for the Château d'Issy

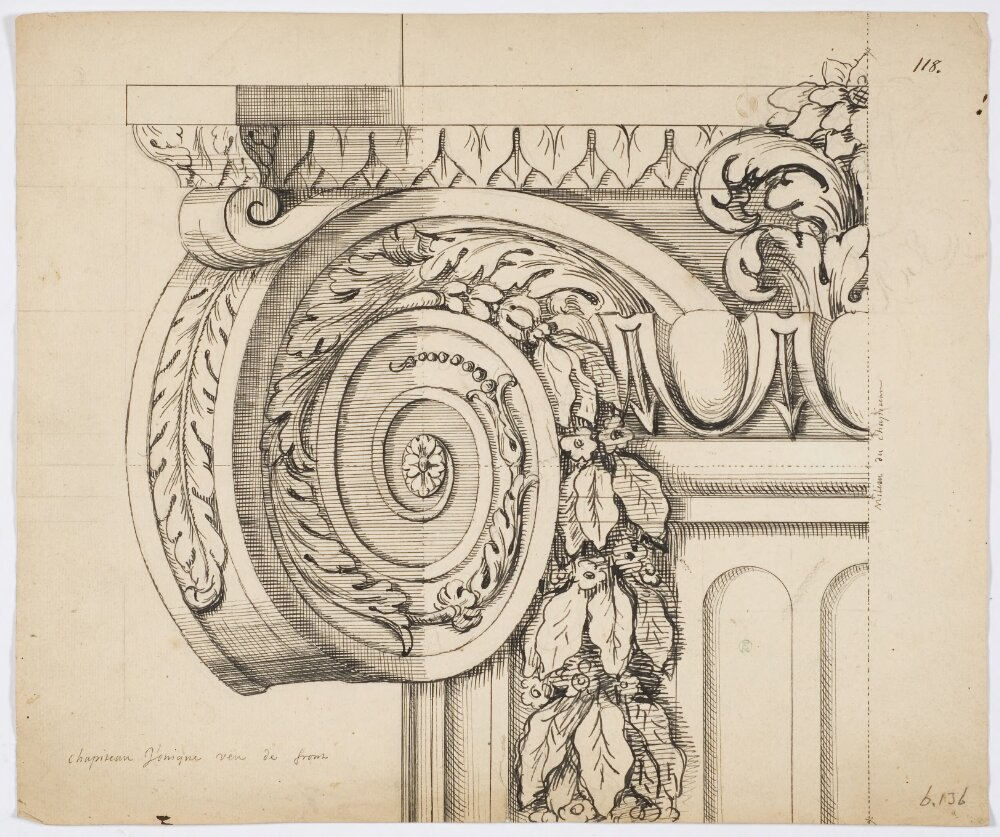
Part of Ionic capital after Scamozzi

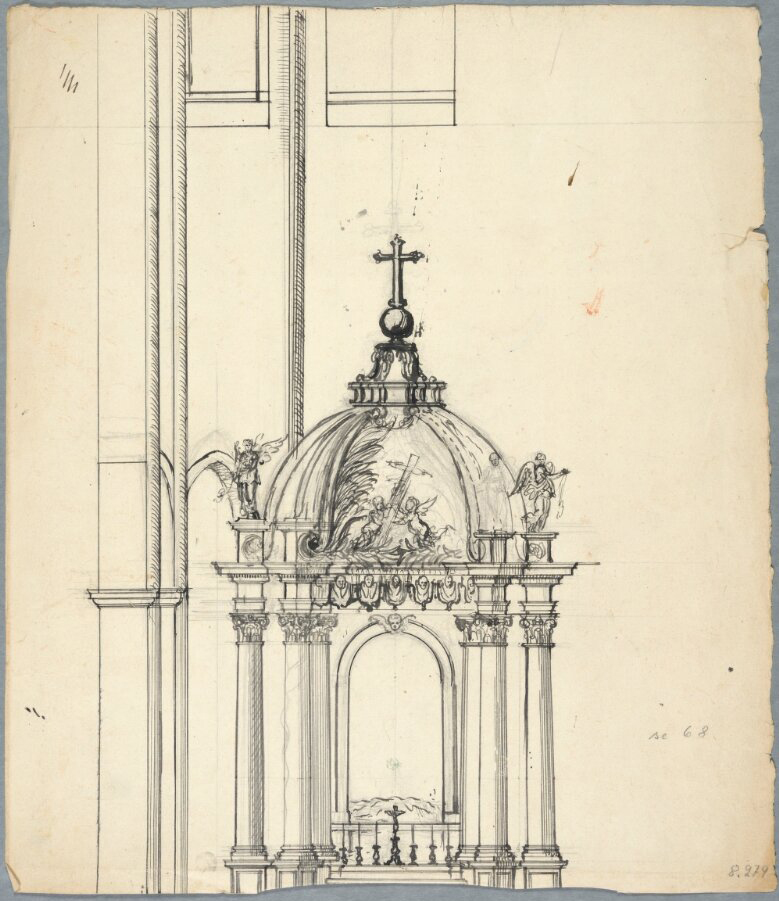
Ciborium for Saint-Germain-des-Prés, Paris

== Publications ==
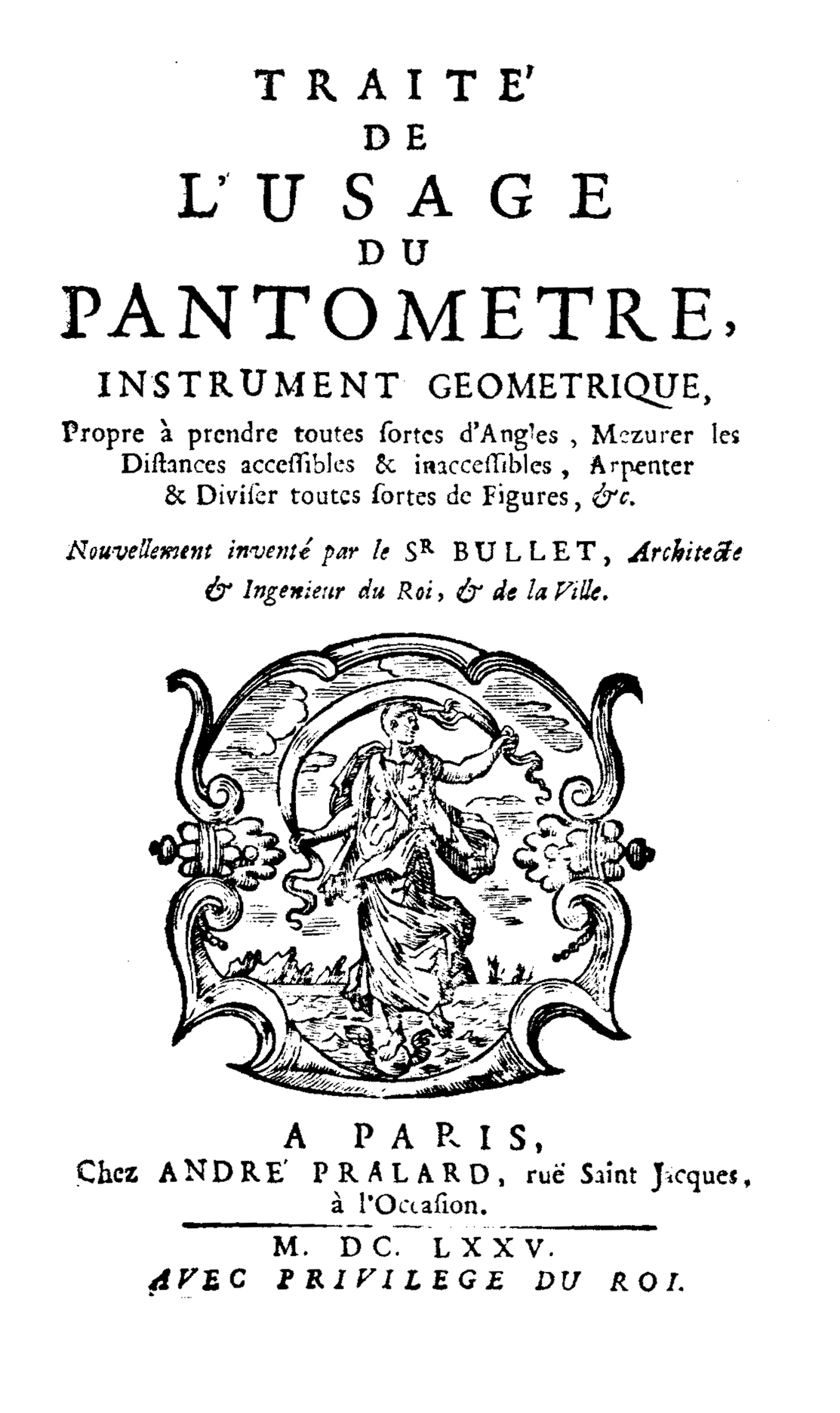
Traité de l'usage du pantometre, 1675

Pierre Bullet published an important map of Paris engraved in twelve sheets and which bears the following title: Plan de Paris levé par les ordres du roy et par les soins de messieurs les prévôts des marchands et échevins, en l'année 1676, par le sieur Bullet, architecte du roy et de la ville, sous la conduite de M. Blondel, directeur de l'Académie royale d'architecture, etc. (Plan of Paris drawn up by the orders of the king and by the care of gentlemen the provosts of the merchants and aldermen, in the year 1676, by Mr. Bullet, architect of the king and of the city, under the direction of Mr. Blondel, director of the Royal Academy of Architecture, etc). Alfred Bonnardot, in his Études archéologiques sur les anciens plans de Paris (Archaeological Studies on the old maps of Paris), considers that this vast print is far from being a masterpiece, in terms of engraving and geometric precision, but that it still offers interest to the archaeologist, because one grasps, in a way, the last traces of old Paris, and the last movements of its metamorphosis.

Pierre Bullet also published a Traité sur l'usage du pantomètre (Treatise on the use of the pantometer), in 1675, and L'Architecture pratique (Practical Architecture), in 1691.
