= Porte Saint-Martin =

Monument in Paris, France

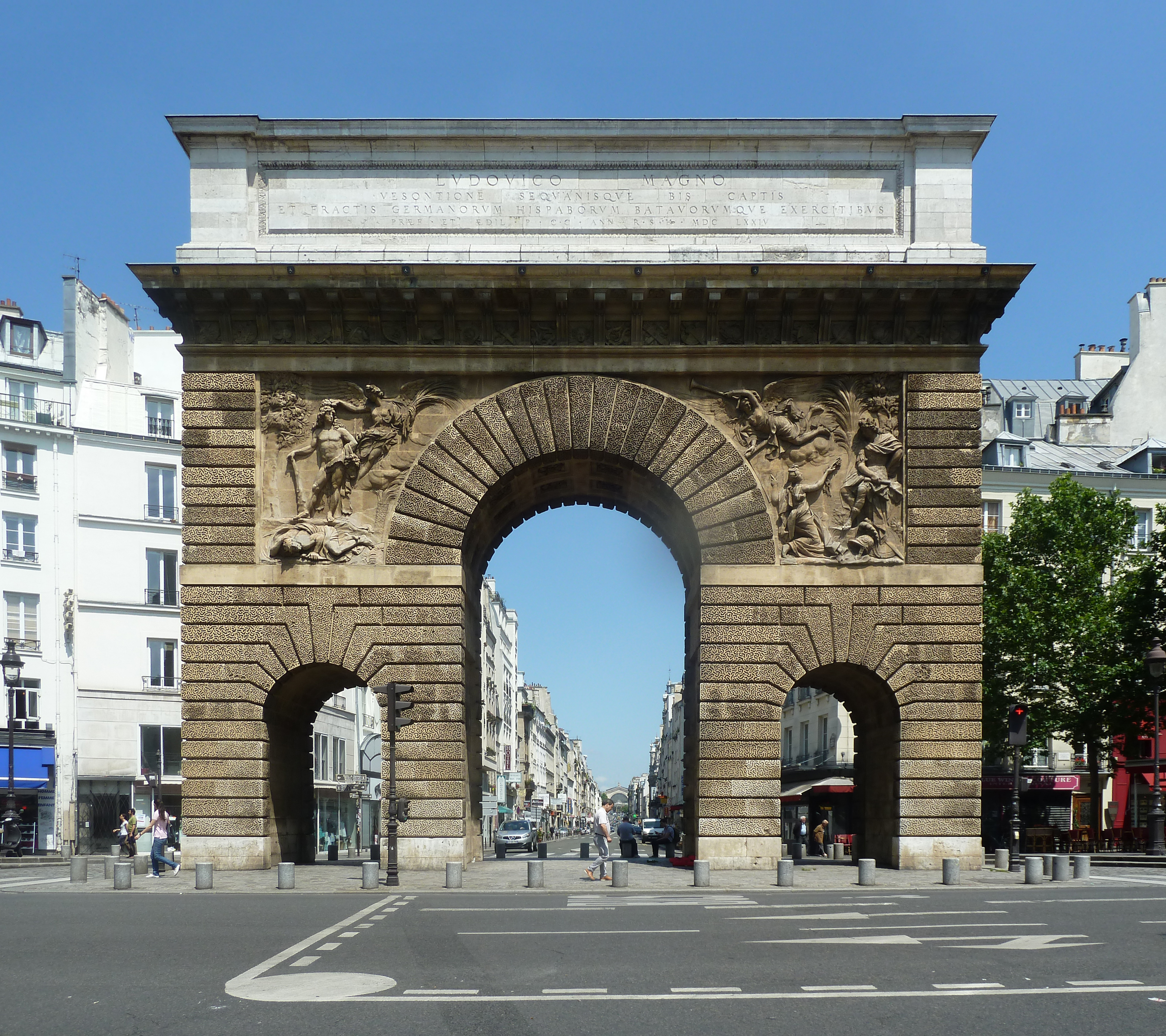
- South face of the Porte Saint-Martin (2014).
- Interactive map of the Porte Saint-Martin area

General information
- Type: Triumphal arch
- Location: 10th arrondissement, Paris, France
- Coordinates: 48°52′08.90″N 2°21′20.25″E
- Completed: 1674

Height
- Height: 18 m

Design and construction
- Architect: Pierre Bullet

The Porte Saint-Martin (French pronunciation: [pɔʁt sɛ̃ maʁtɛ̃], St. Martin Gate) is a Parisian monument located at the site of one of the gates of the now-destroyed fortifications of Paris. It is located at the intersection of the Rue Saint-Martin from the south, the Rue du Faubourg Saint-Martin from the north and the grands boulevards Boulevard Saint-Martin from the east and Boulevard Saint-Denis from the west.

== History ==
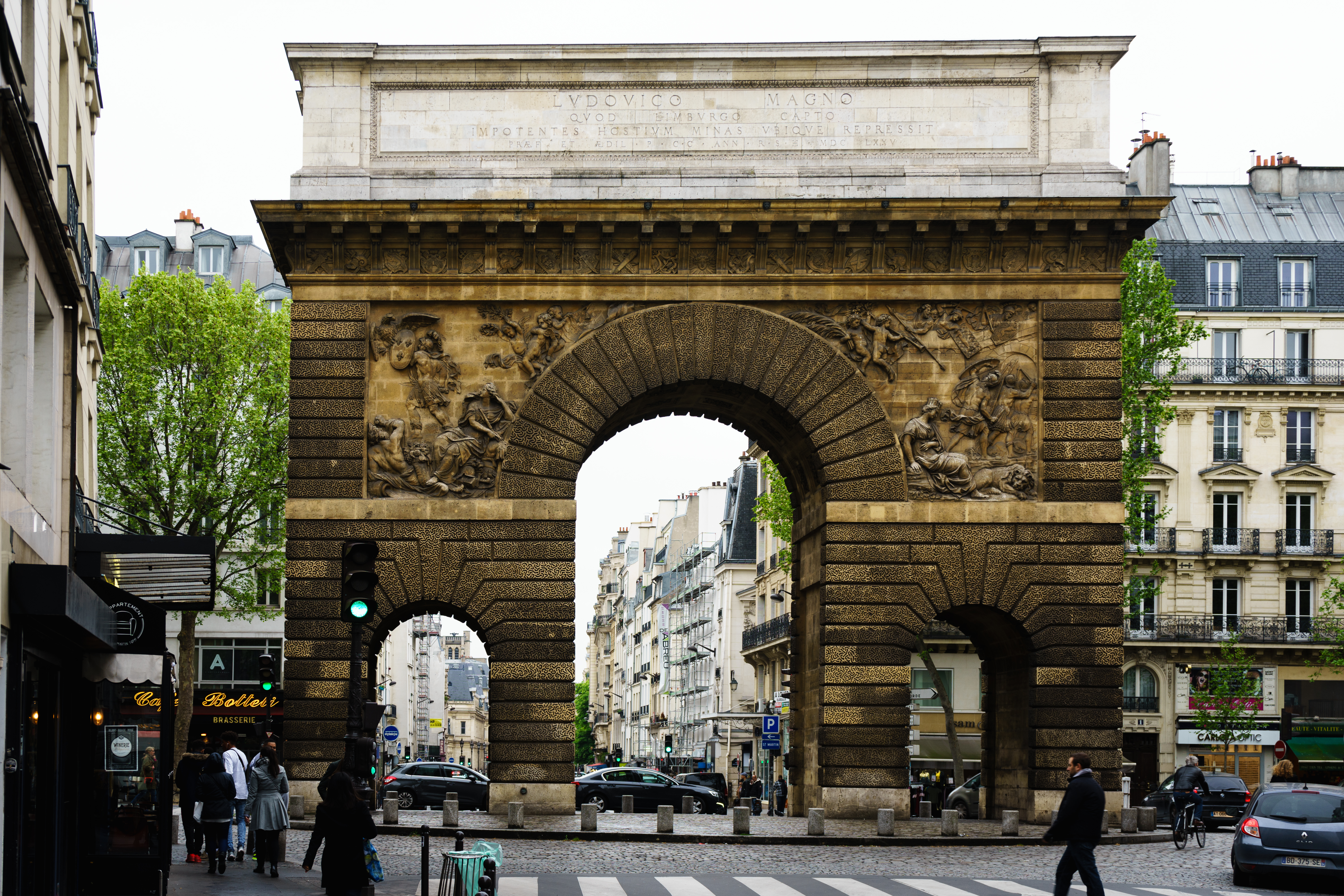
North face of the Porte Saint-Martin

The Porte Saint-Martin was designed by architect Pierre Bullet (a student of François Blondel, architect of the nearby Porte Saint-Denis) at the order of Louis XIV in honor of his victories on the Rhine and in Franche-Comté. Built in 1674, it replaced a medieval gate in the city walls built by Charles V. It was restored in 1988.

== Description ==
The Porte Saint-Martin is a heavily rusticated triumphal arch, 18 meters high, built in limestone and marble. Recesses are occupied by bas-reliefs:

- North side right: La Prise du Limbourg en 1675 (The Capture of Limbourg) by Pierre Le Gros the Elder, a sitting woman next to a lion
- North side left: La Défaite des Allemands (The Defeat of the Germans) by Gaspard Marsy, Louis XIV as Mars carrying the shield of France and pushing back a German eagle to protect a woman and an old man
- South side left: La Rupture de la Triple Alliance (The Breaking of the Triple Alliance) by Étienne le Hongre, Louis XIV as Hercules, partly nude
- South side right: La prise de Besançon (The Capture of Besançon) by Martin van den Bogaert, Louis XIV dressed as Fame, standing in front of an olive tree and receiving keys from a woman

== Access ==
| Located near the Métro stations: Strasbourg - Saint-Denis and République. |

== See also ==
- Porte Saint-Denis
- List of post-Roman triumphal arches
