= Château d'Issy =

Coordinates: 48°49′21.5″N 2°16′23.5″E

General information
- Type: Château
- Architectural style: French Baroque
- Construction started: 1681
- Completed: 1709
- Owner: House of Bourbon-Conti

Design and construction
- Architects: Pierre Bullet; André Le Nôtre

The Château d'Issy, at Issy-les-Moulineaux, in the Hauts-de-Seine department of France, was a small French Baroque château on the outskirts of Paris. It was destroyed during the Paris Commune of 1871.

== History ==
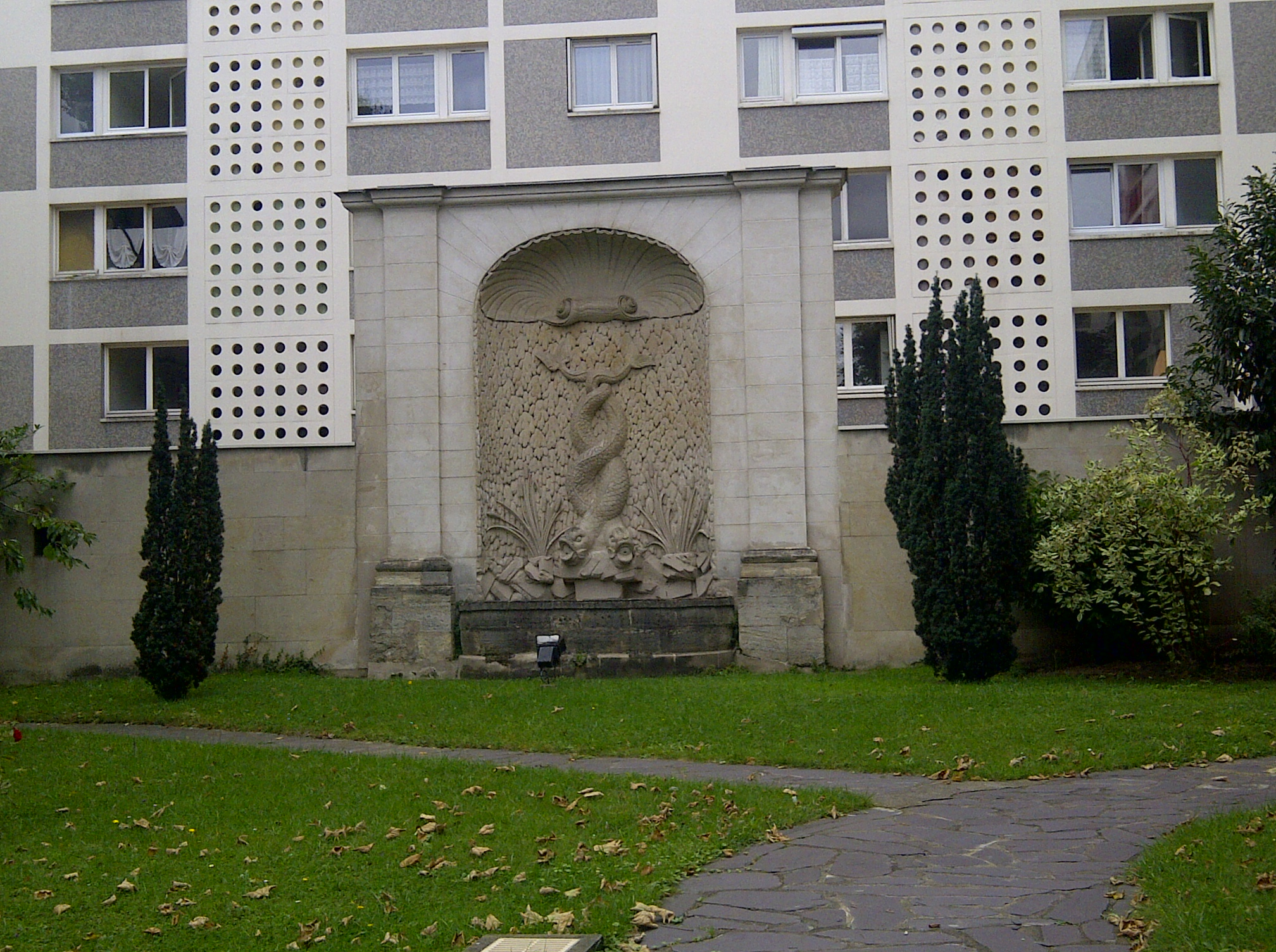
Fontaine du Château d'Issy

The small plot of land was bought in 1681 by the président à mortier Denis Talon, who commissioned the architect Pierre Bullet, a pupil of François Blondel, to design a small maison de plaisance. Denis Talon also commissioned the landscape architect André Le Nôtre to construct a collection of fountains for the garden, while Pierre Desgots, Le Nôtre's brother-in-law, would carry out work on the park. At the time, Le Nôtre was undertaking modifications to the gardens of the Château de Meudon owned by the Grand Dauphin.

Denis Talon died in 1698. The following year, on 4 February 1699, François Louis de Bourbon, Prince of Conti, known as le Grand Conti, bought the estate for the sum of 140,000 livres. The wealthy Prince du sang undertook many modifications, which are thought to have been carried out by Bullet. The Prince had the façades of the château redesigned and also had a small "pavillon des bains" built. By the time of the Prince's death in 1709, the whole estate had been completely updated. The estate remained the property of the Princes of Conti until the Revolution of 1789, when it was confiscated as biens nationaux.

Louis François de Bourbon, the grandson of the Grand Conti, lost his beloved wife at the château. Louise Diane d'Orléans was the daughter of Philippe d'Orléans, the former Regent. She died in 1736, at the age of twenty, while giving birth to a stillborn child in 1736. After her death, her husband rarely used the property.

When the Bourbon Restoration bought the monarchy back to France, the château was sold several times. The 19th century saw the addition of a dovecote, an orangery and of a building similar to the 17th-century "pavillon des bains".

During the Paris Commune of 1871, the château was bombed and left to burn. It stood in ruins for over forty years before being demolished in 1910. Later on, the town purchased a small part of the estate which had mostly been sold off in lots. That plot of land was transformed into Issy-les-Moulineaux municipal park Henri Barbusse.

The sculptor Auguste Rodin repurchased the pediment of the garden façade, as well as the avant-corps columns; he set up these pieces at his property of Meudon (Hauts-de-Seine).

Most of the site is now the home of the Musée Français de la Carte à Jouer ("French Playing Card Museum").

=== Gallery ===
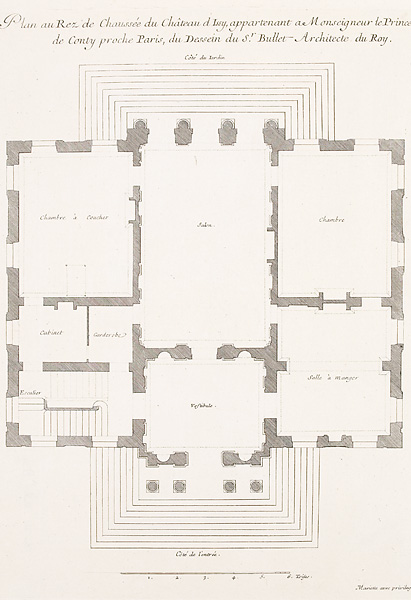
Ground floor of Issy, c.1699, Bullet

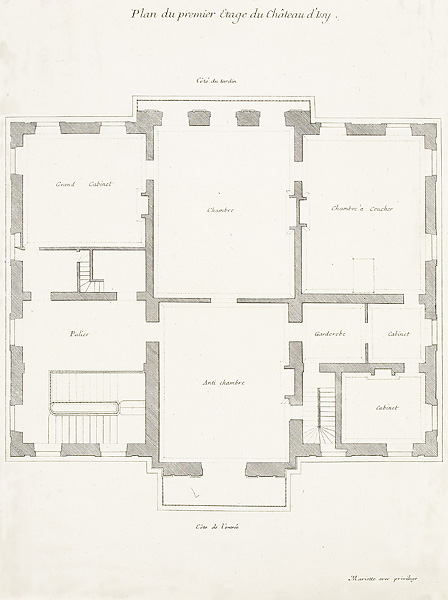
Second floor of Issy, c.1699, Bullet

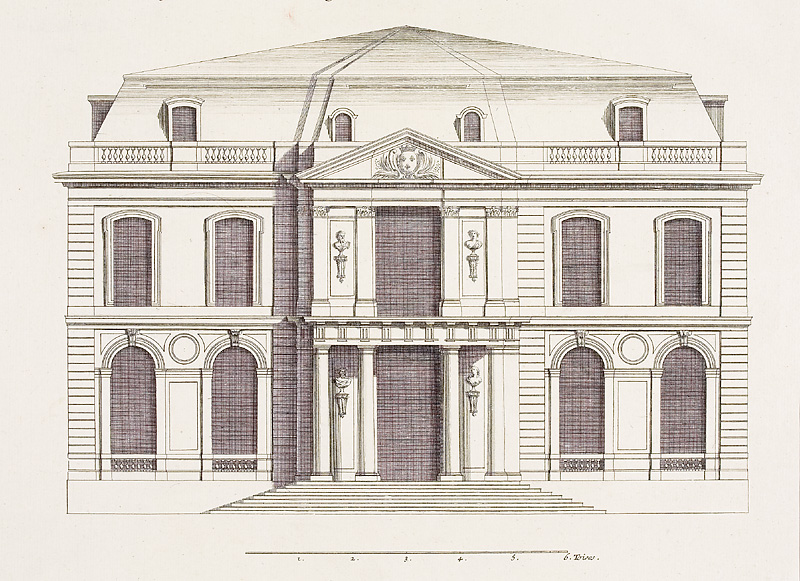
Entrance façade, c.1699, Bullet

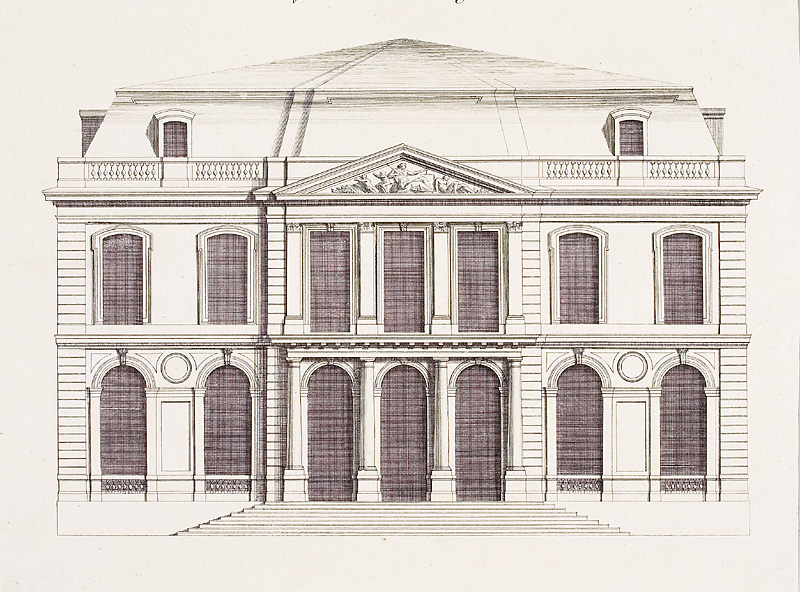
Garden façade, c.1699, Bullet

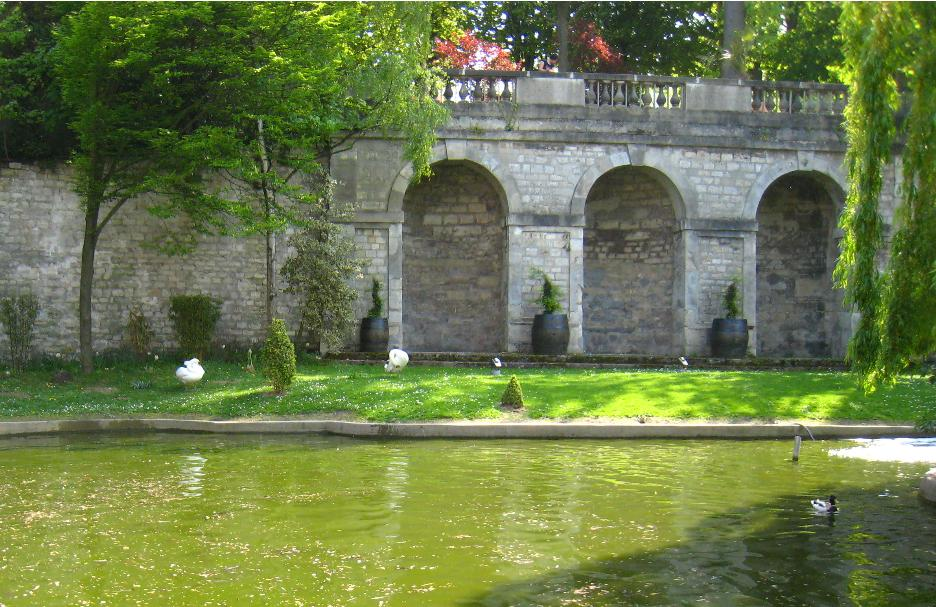
