= Saint-Thomas-d'Aquin, Paris =

Church in Paris, France

Coordinates: 48.8564°N 2.3275°E

Saint-Thomas-d'Aquin
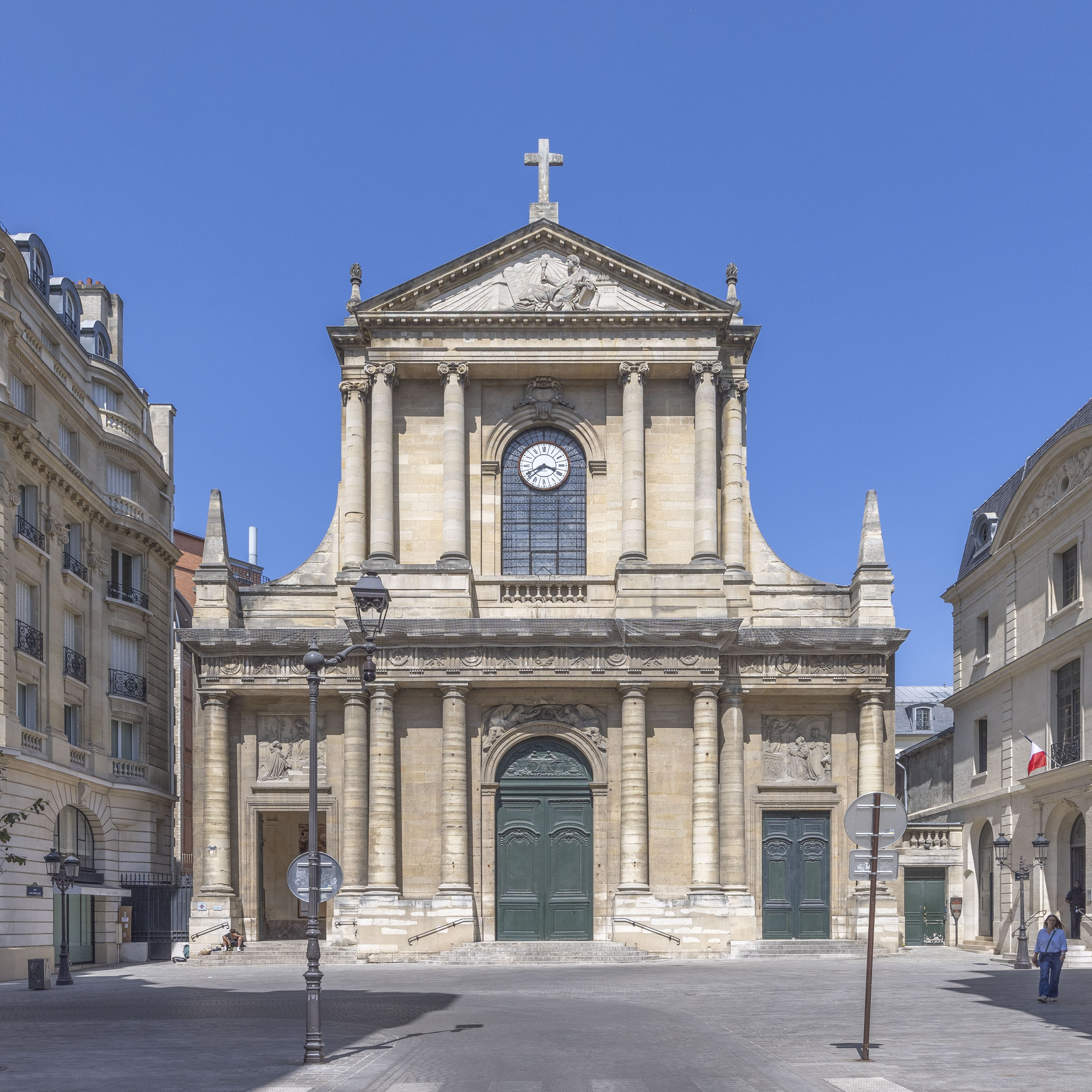

Religion
- Affiliation: Catholic Church
- Province: Archdiocese of Paris
- Rite: Roman Rite
- Status: Active

Location
- Location: Place Saint-Thomas-d'Aquin, 7th arrondissement, Paris
- Interactive map of Saint-Thomas-d'Aquin

Architecture
- Architect: Pierre Bullet
- Style: Neo-Classical, Baroque
- Groundbreaking: 1682
- Completed: 1683

Saint-Thomas-d'Aquin (French pronunciation: [sɛ̃ tɔma dakɛ̃]) is a Roman Catholic church located in the 7th arrondissement of Paris, place Saint-Thomas-d’Aquin, between the rue du Bac and the boulevard Saint-Germain. The church is named for Saint Thomas Aquinas, a Dominican friar and priest, and influential philosopher and theologian in the 13th century. It was originally a chapel of an abbey of the Dominican order in Paris. Construction began in 1682, and the church was consecrated in 1682. The friars were expelled and the church was closed during the French Revolution, and was not returned to the Catholic church until 1802. During the 19th century, the City of Paris endowed the church with many fine examples of French religious art. The church was declared an Historic Monument in 1982. The newest campus of SciencesPo, 1, Saint-Thomas, stands next to it.

== History ==
In 1632 the friars established a small training centre with a chapel in the Faubourg Saint-Germain neighbourhood on the left bank in Paris, named for the founder of the order, Saint Dominic. As the convent grew, in 1682 the friars decided to enlarge the monastery and build a larger church. Work began under architect Pierre Bullet in 1683, with funding provided by Cardinal Richelieu and other donors. In 1722 a separate choir for the friars (now called the Chapel of Saint Louis) was added to the church. It was not until 1770 that Brother Claude, a Dominican, built the portal of this church.

The French Revolution began in 1789, and in 1791 the church was transformed into a parish church, and was rededicated to Saint Thomas Aquinas. The rapidly developing Revolution turned life at the church upside down. The friars were expelled in 1793, and the abbey buildings were turned to a factory for making munitions. The church was then designated as the site of the future revolutionary museum of the history of artillery (The history of artillery collection gathered for the museum is now found in Les Invalides). In 1797, the church was redesigned a "Temple of Peace" for a group calling themselves "Theophilanthropes". It then became a meeting hall for the radical Jacobins, until their downfall. It was finally returned to the Church by Napoleon Bonaparte in 1802, under the Concordat of 1801.

== Exterior ==
The facade of the church is in the classical style, inspired by the Italian Baroque architecture, particularly the facade of the Church of the Gesù, the church of the Jesuits in Rome. finished in 1584. The Gesu facade was widely copied in Paris and other cities. The facade was designed by the Dominican friar Claude Navan, and was built between 1765 and 1769. Following the style of classical architecture, the lower level has columns of the Doric order while the upper level columns are in the Ionic order. On either side of the facade and one-story wings, connected with the facade by curving wings, and capped at the corners by Obelisques, which serve as buttresses for the upper level.

The tympanum of the triangular pediment over the entrance is decorated with a relief sculpture called "La Religion", made in 1769 by François-Charles Butteux (1732-1788). It depicts an allegorical figure of Religion, supported by Truth, holding the tablets symbolising law.

Another more recent relief sculpture is placed over the central portal; Two angels hold palms and crowns.

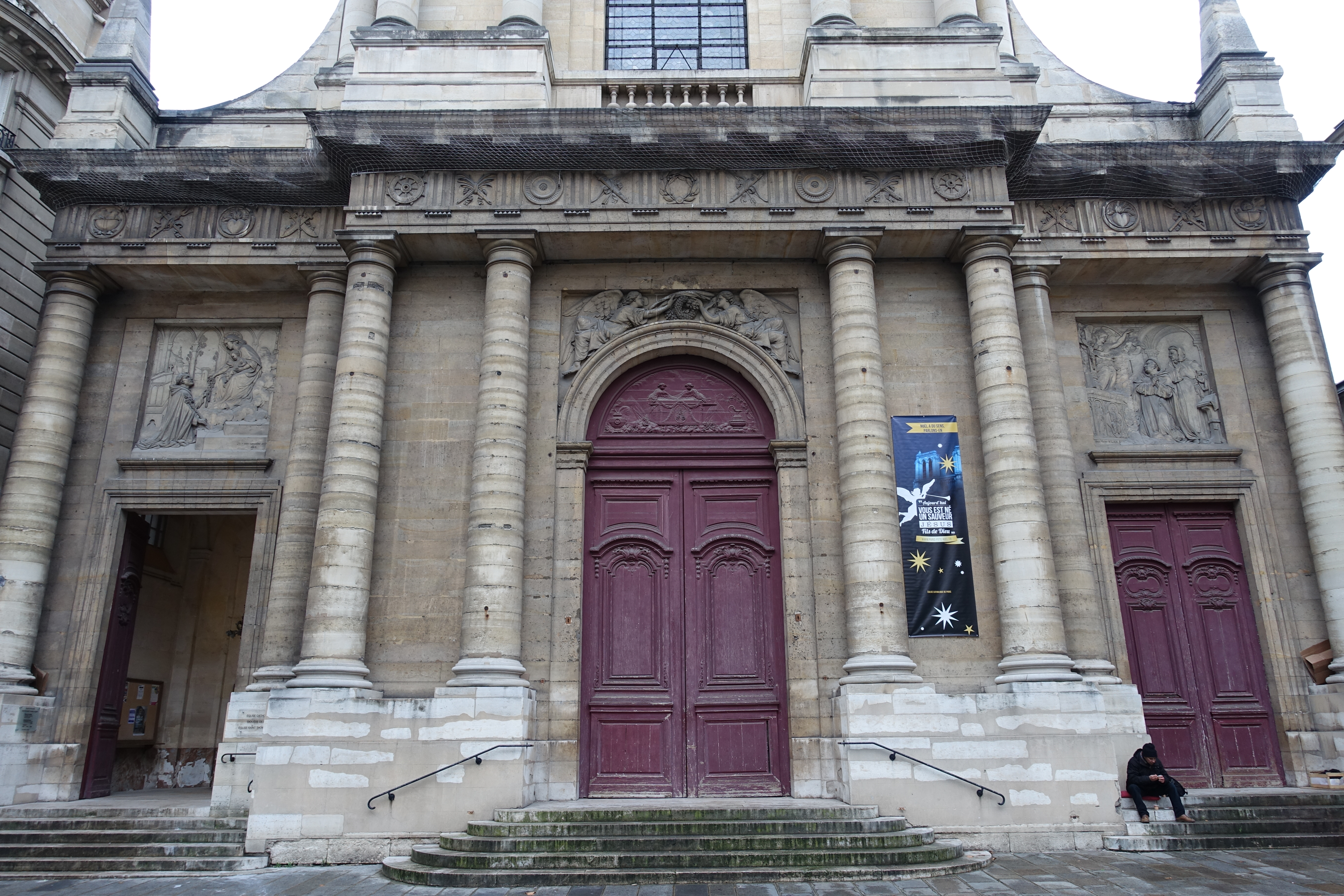
Facade decoration

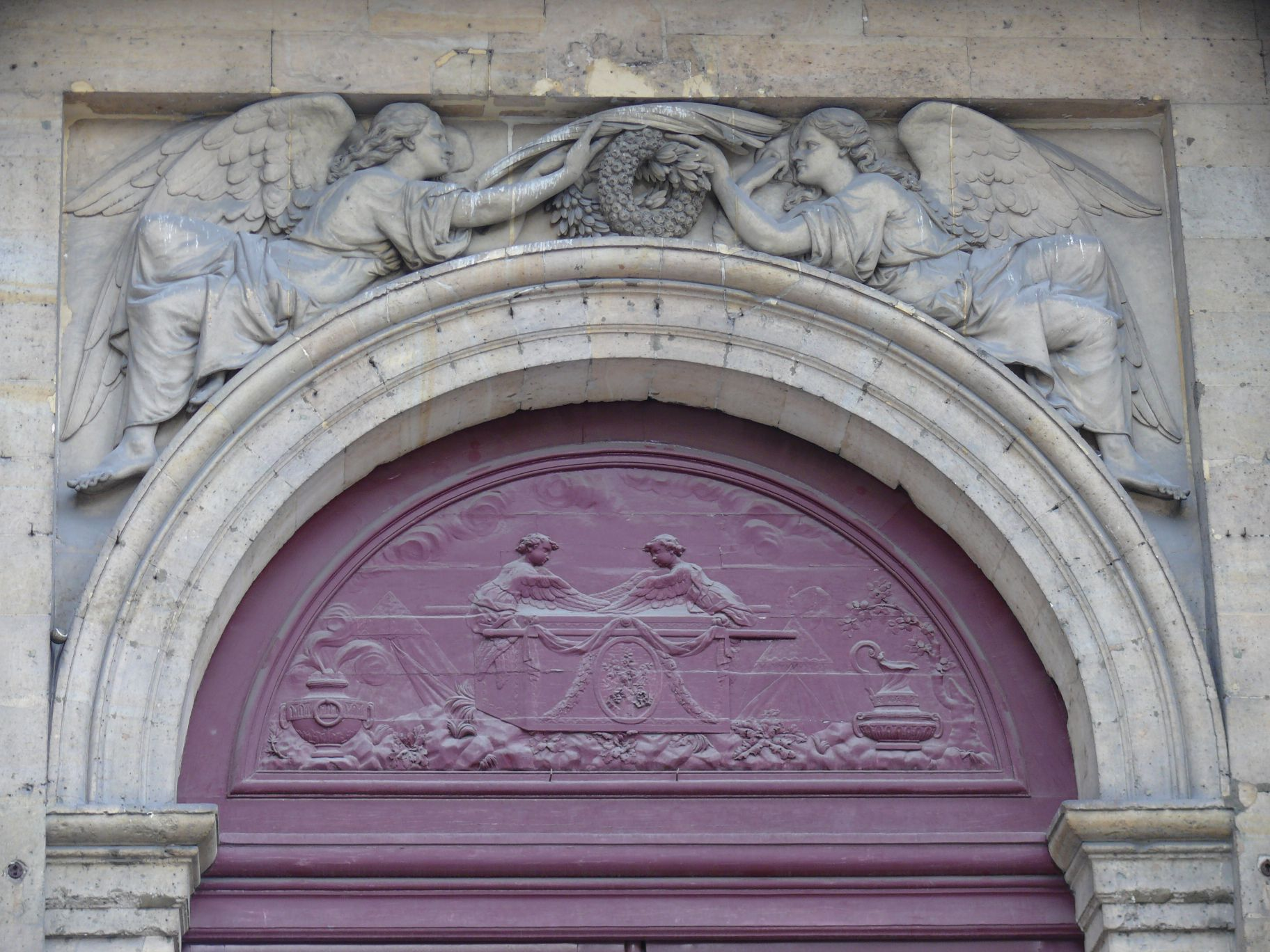
Angels by Louis-Joseph Daumas, 1801-1887

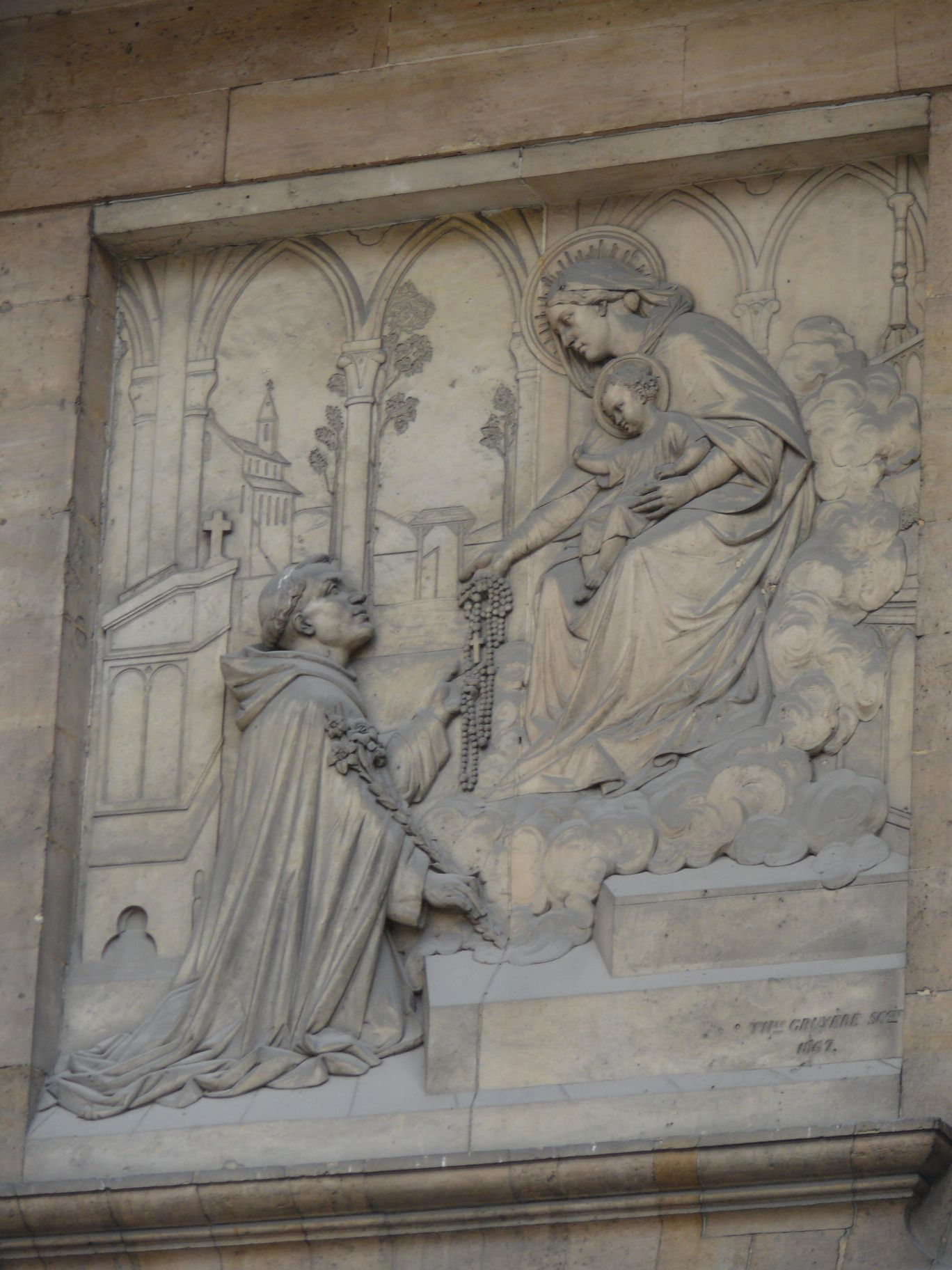
"Virgin giving rosary to Saint Dominique" (1867). by Théodore-Charles Gruyère

== Interior ==
The interior follows the traditions of beauty as defined classical architecture, with symmetry and rigorous lines. expressing symmetry and strong lines. The nave is covered by a barrel vault, and the nave is separated from the side aisles by two arcades with rounded arches, supported by columns with classical Corinthian order capitals. The central element in the choir is a miniature classical temple over the altar, with a series of rounded arches behind it, decorated with murals.

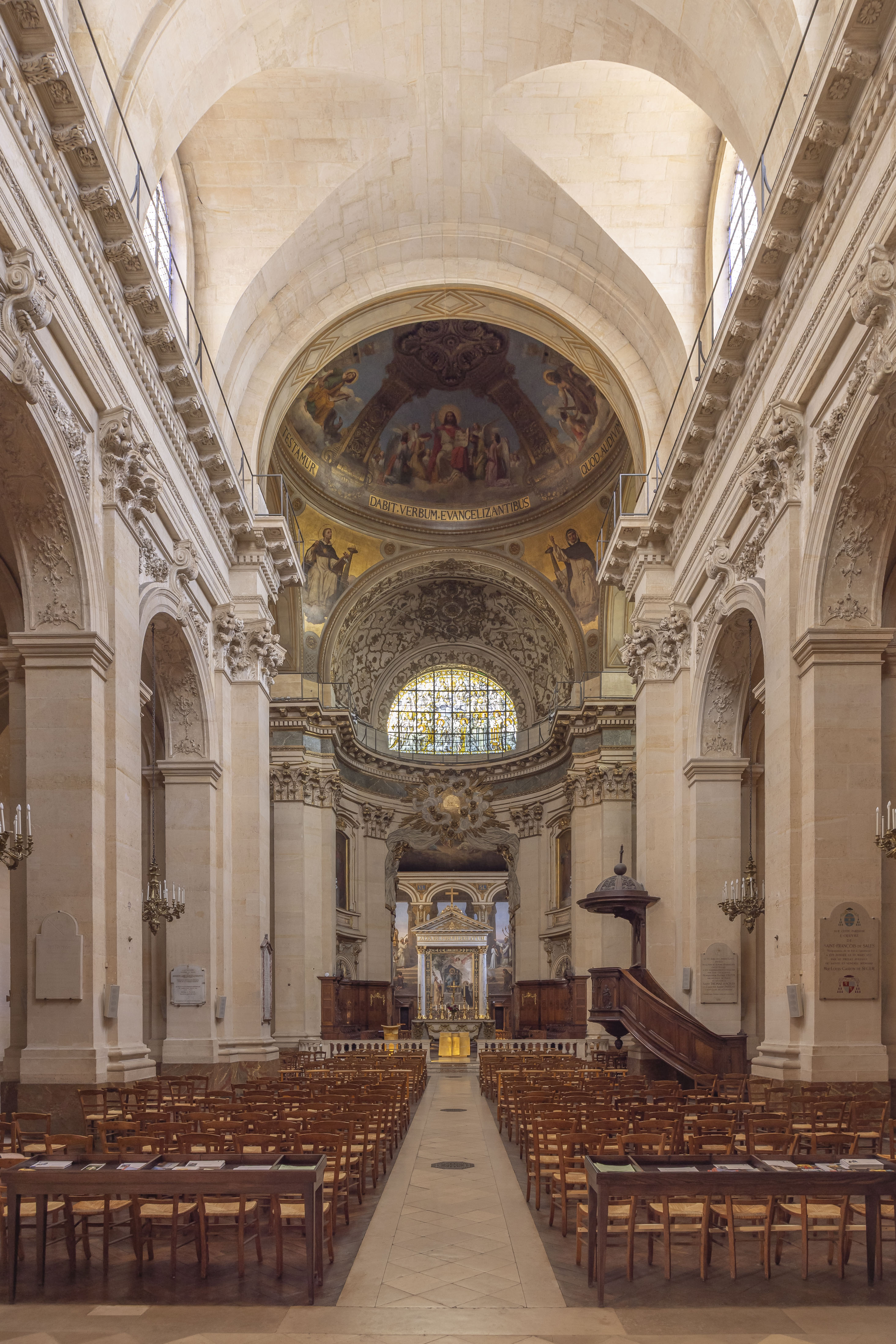
Nave facing the choir

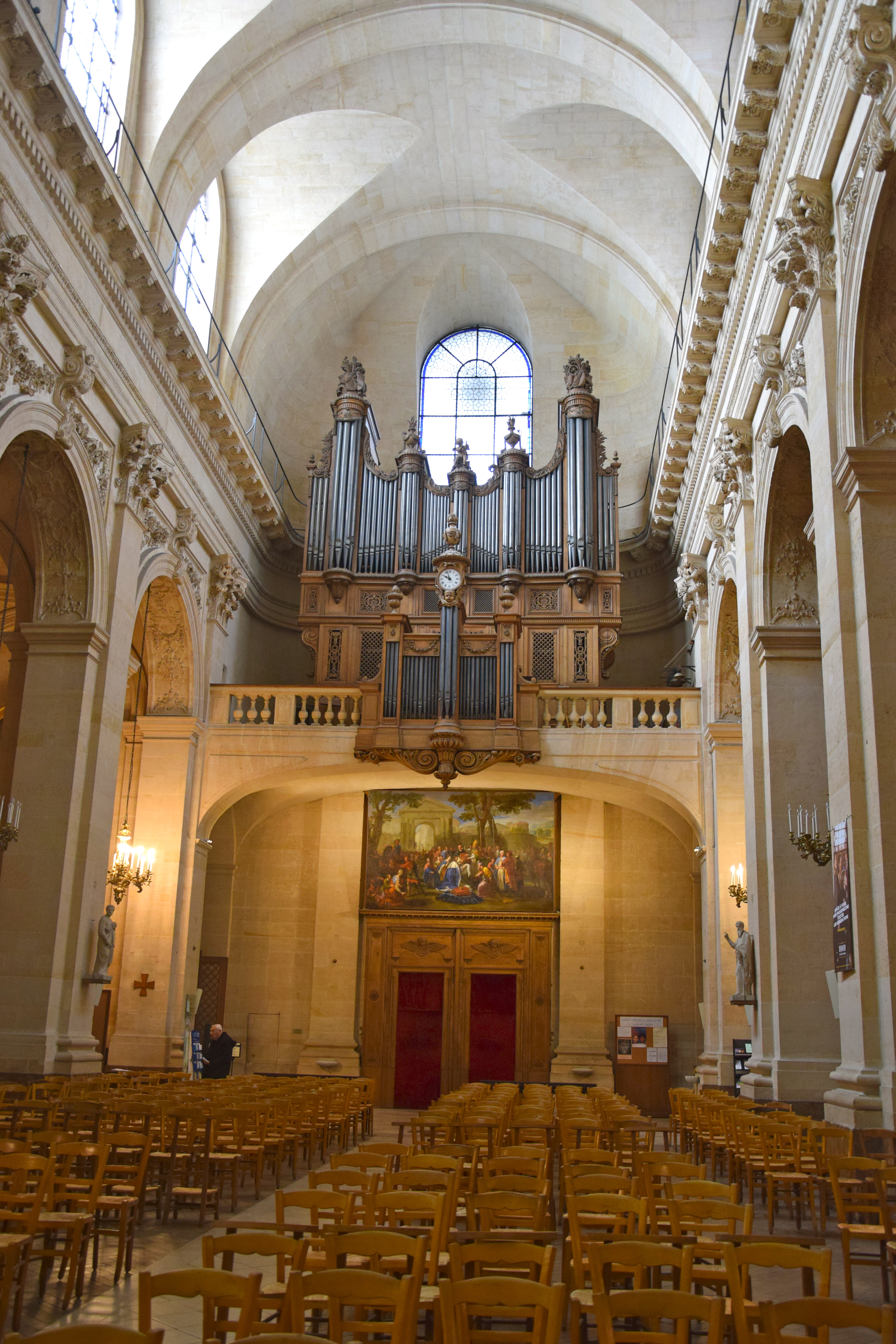
Nave facing the organ

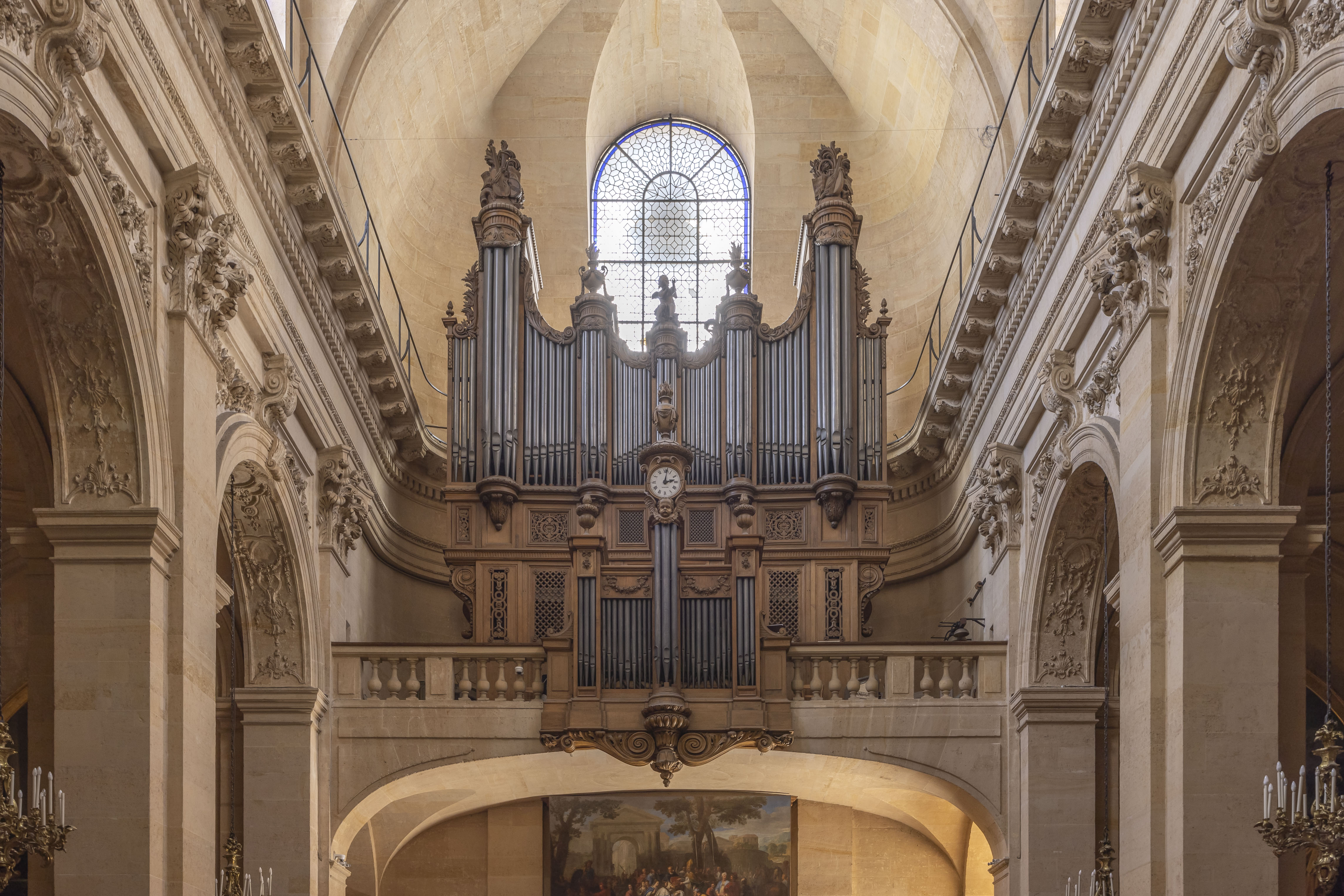
The organ

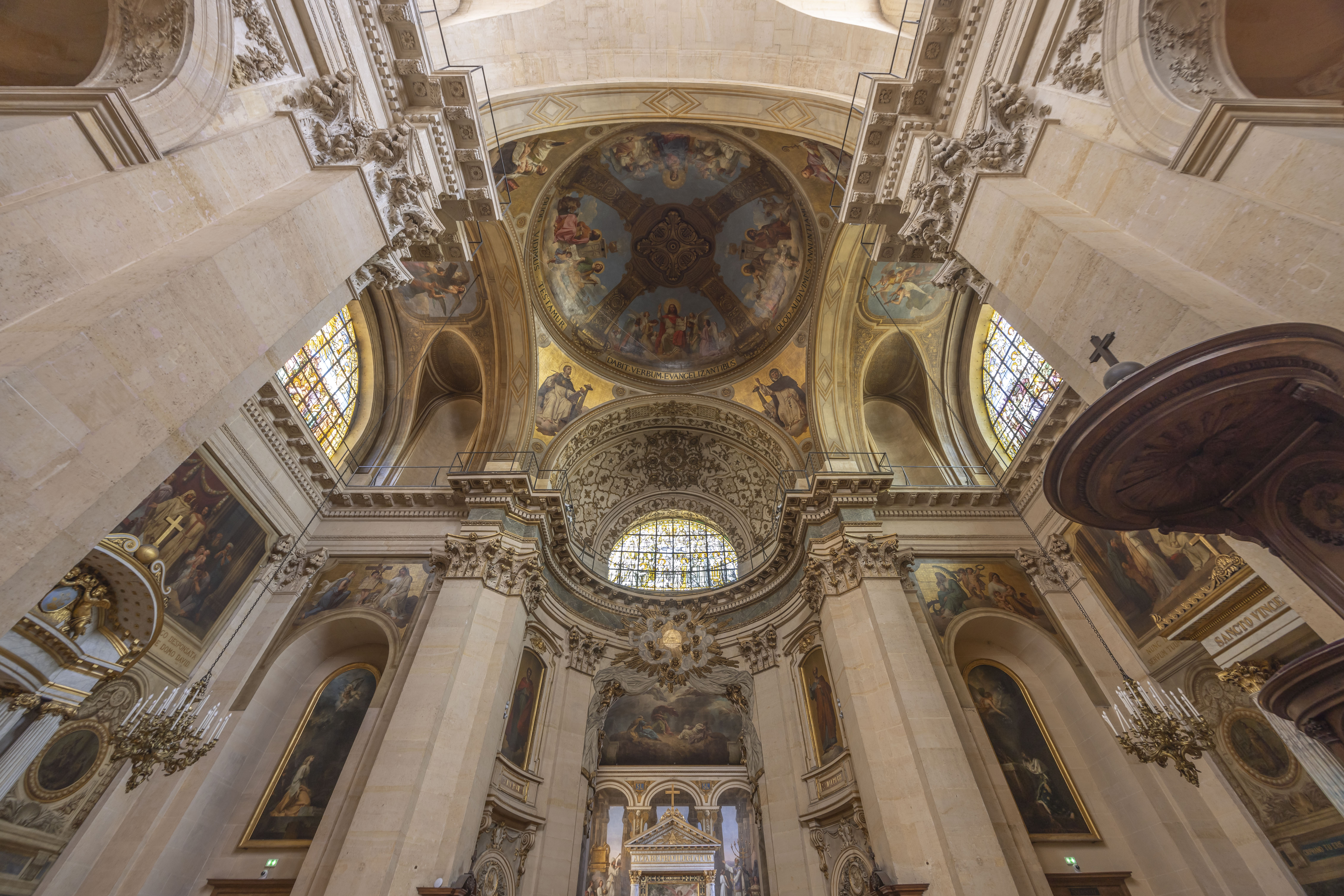
The choir and dome

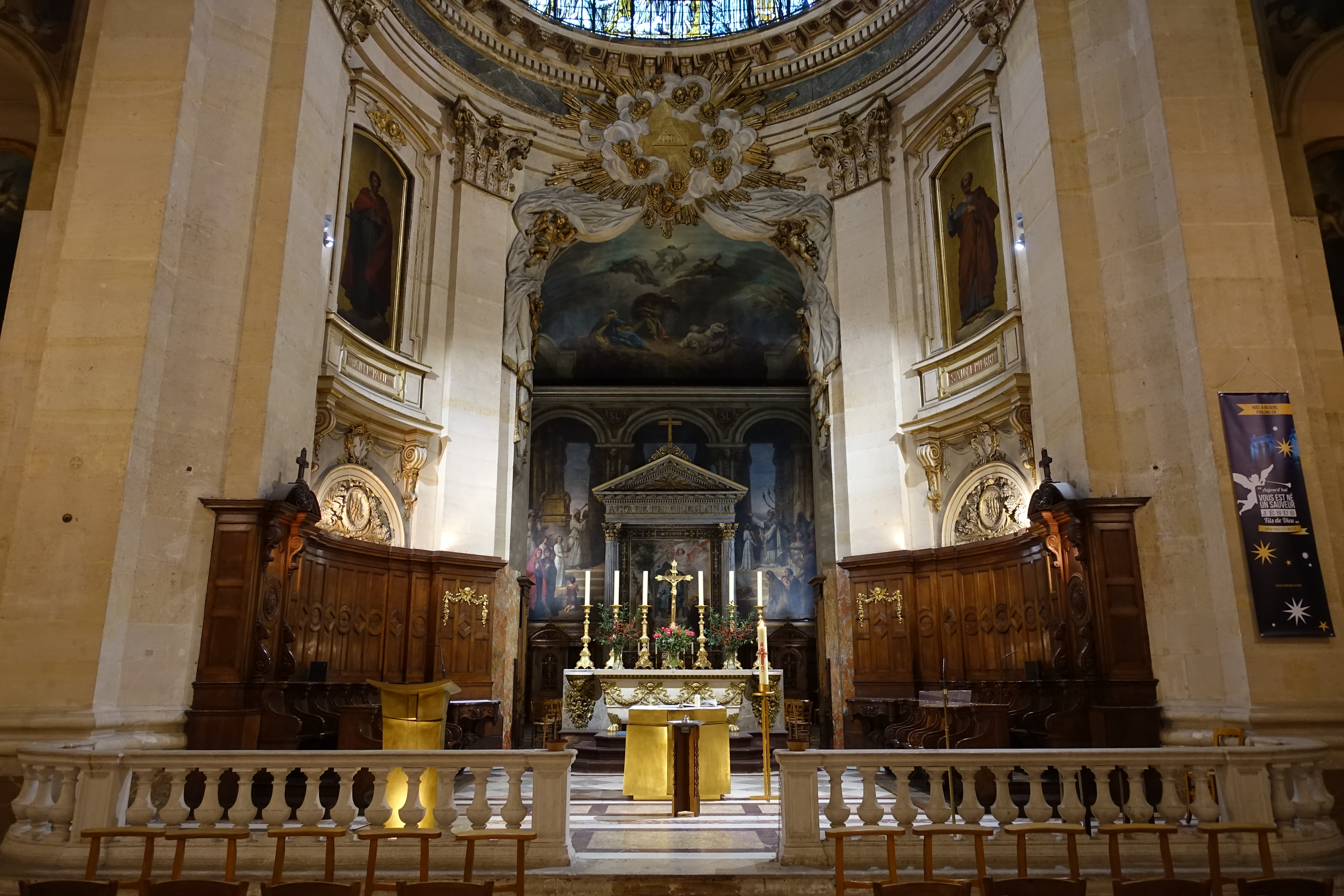
Altar and stalls in the Choir

A major painting by Salvator Rosa (1615-1753) "the Assumption of the Virgin", is displayed on the lower right side. Following the theatrical style of the Counter-Reformation, it presents two adjoining worlds; the earthly world, where the Apostles find the empty tomb of the Virgin Mary; and the celestial world, where the Virgin is transported to heaven by a flight of angels. The expressions of astonishment of the apostles contrast with the serene expressions of Mary and the angels above.

=== The Chapel of Saint Louis ===
The Chapel of Saint Louis, in the choir behind the altar, is the most highly decorated space in the interior. It was originally the choir used by the friars. It was built in 1722 and is decorated to commemorate the return of the original Crown of Thorns from the Crucifixion to France, carried by two Dominican friars in 1239. The walls are covered with carved wood panels and confessionals from the 19th century, and by murals.

The 19th-century painting under the classical pediment depicts "Saint Louis renders justice beneath an oak tree," painted by Luc-Olivier Merson (1846-1920). Saint Louis is joined by an angel, by a figure representing Religion, and an angel.

The ceiling of the chapel is covered with an 18th-century fresco by Francois Lemoyne (1688-1737), "The Transfiguration". In the painting, a vision of Christ, accompanied by Moses and Elijah, appears in the heavens to the apostles Peter, James and John. The illusion of looking into the heavens is enhanced by the painted architecture that merges with the real architecture of the chapel below. Not long after making this fresco, Lemoyne painted a similar monumental fresco for the ceiling of the Salon of Hercules in the Palace of Versailles.

In the third traverse is a painting by another Italian master of the 17th century, Giovanni-Francesco Barbieri, better known as Guercino (1591-1666). This painting was originally in the Church of the Rosary in Cento, where the artist was born. It depicts "The Virgin Mary appears to Saint Jerome." Saint Jerome (340-420 AD) was the author the first translation of the Bible into Latin, known as the Vulgate. In the painting, Saint Jerome's face shows his emotions inspired by the vision of the Virgin.

The lower side also presents the painting "The Transfiguration", by Jean Restout the Younger (1692-1768), which features the figures of Saint John and other Apostles painted with a vivid chromatic palate.

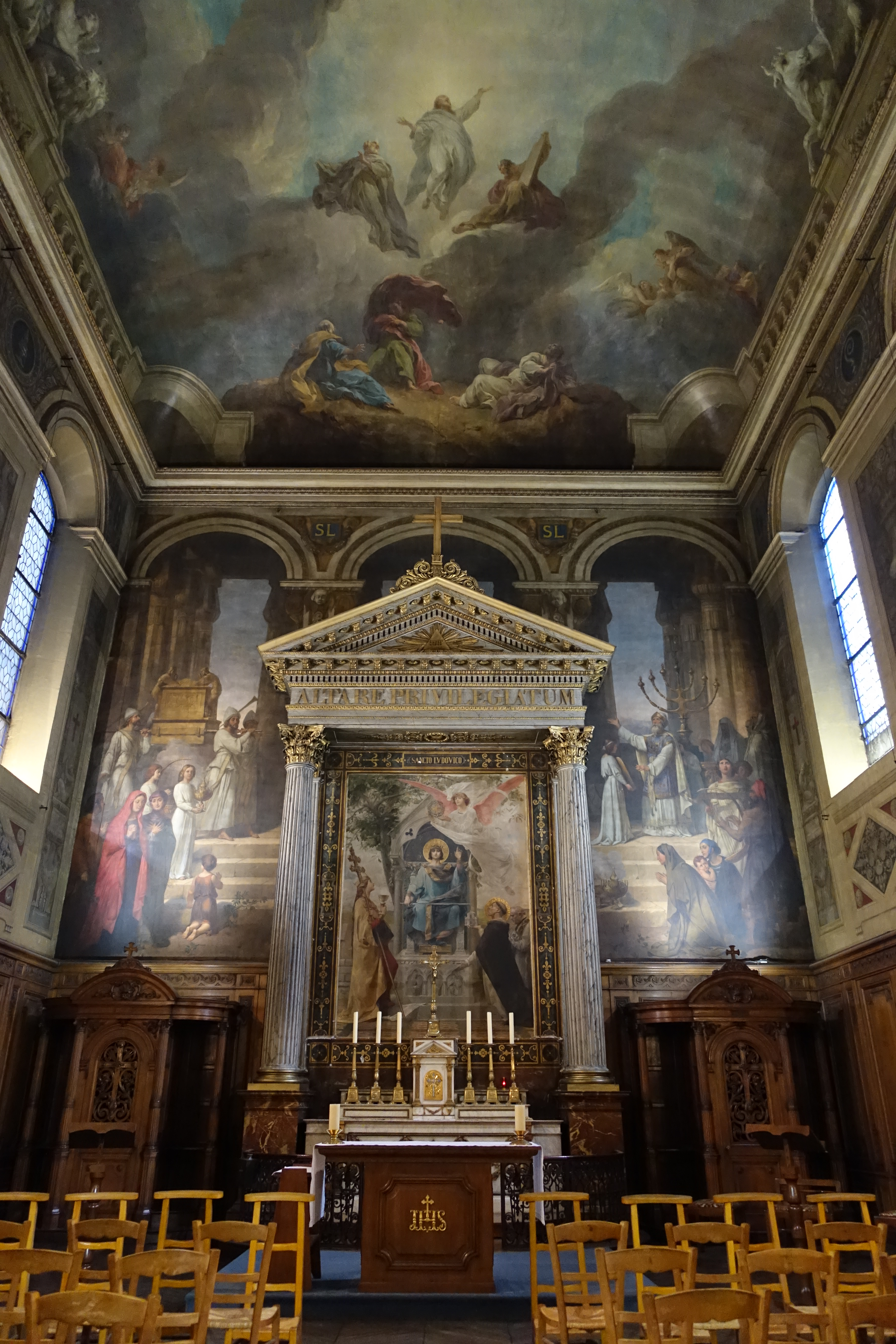
Chapel of Saint-Louis

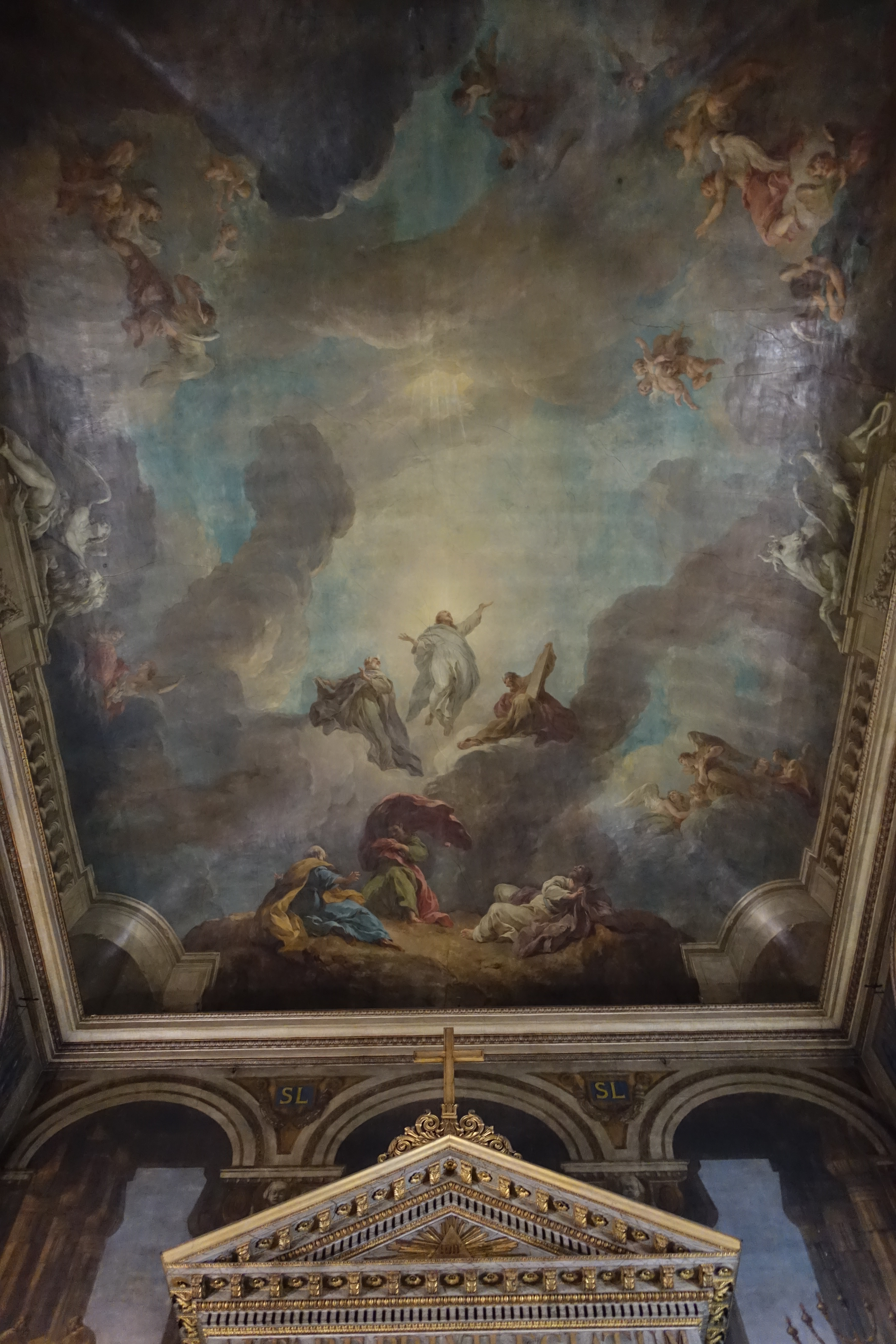
"The Transfiguration" by Francois Lemoyne, Ceiling of the Chapel of Saint Louis

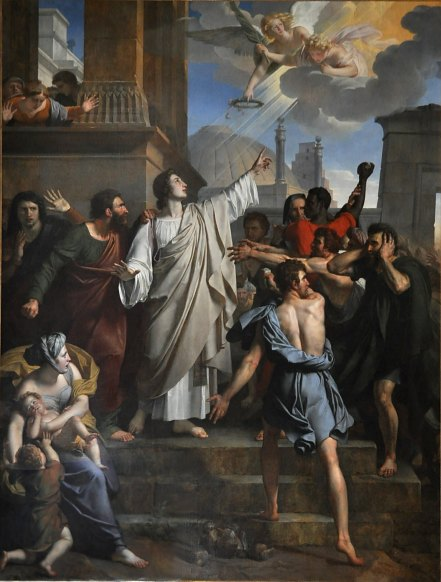
"Saint Stephen preaching the Gospel" by Abel de Pujol

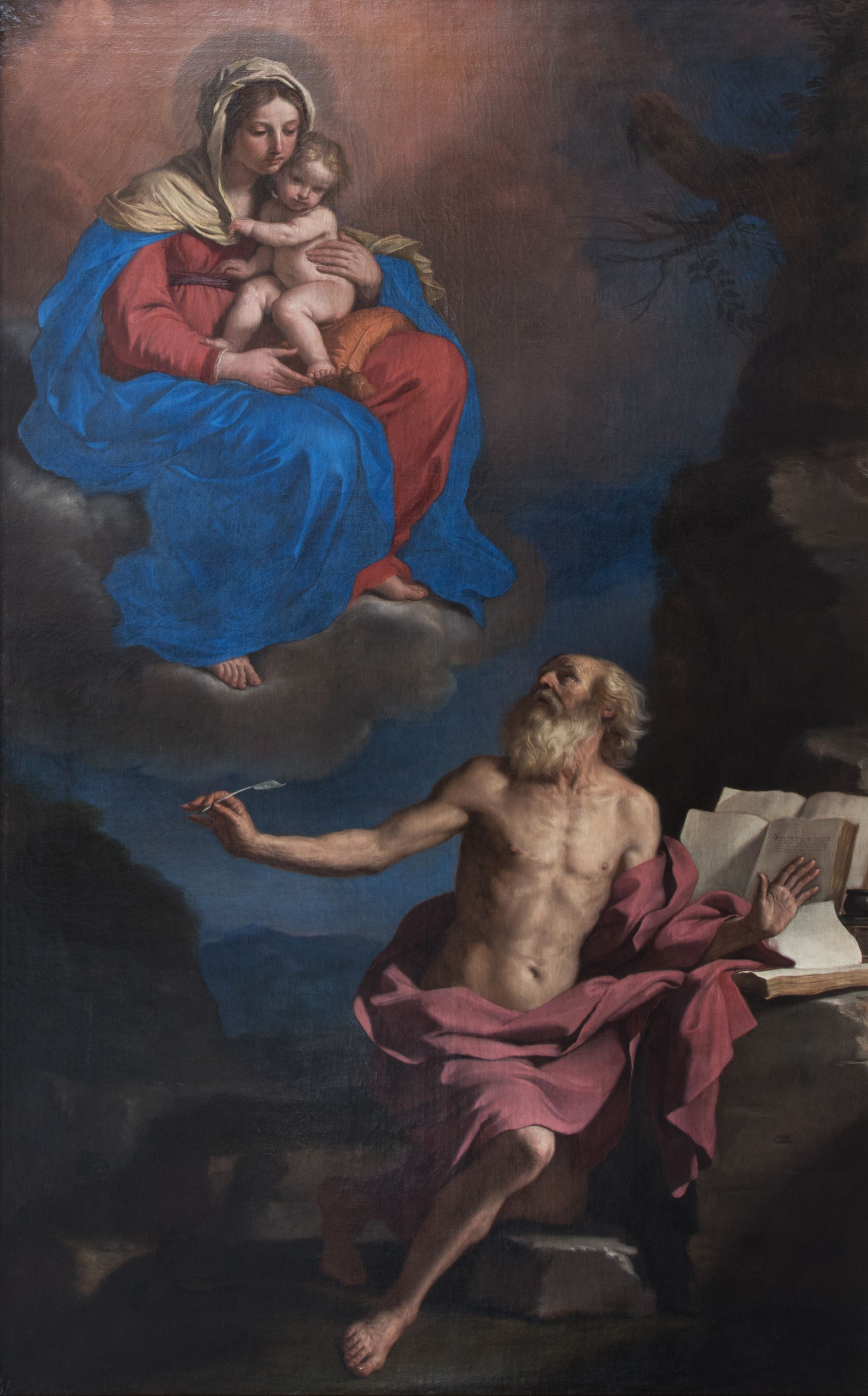
"The Virgin and Child appearing to Saint Jerome" by Guercino

== Decoration ==
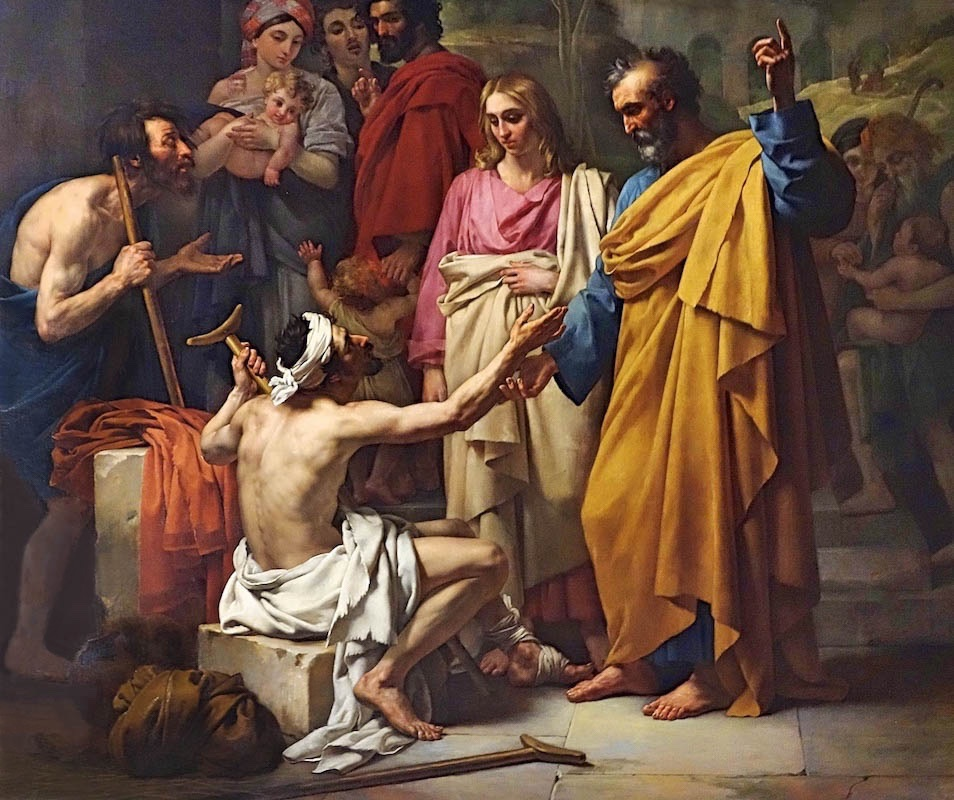
"Saint Peter Heals a Lame Beggar" by Louis-Vincent-Léon Pallière (1819)

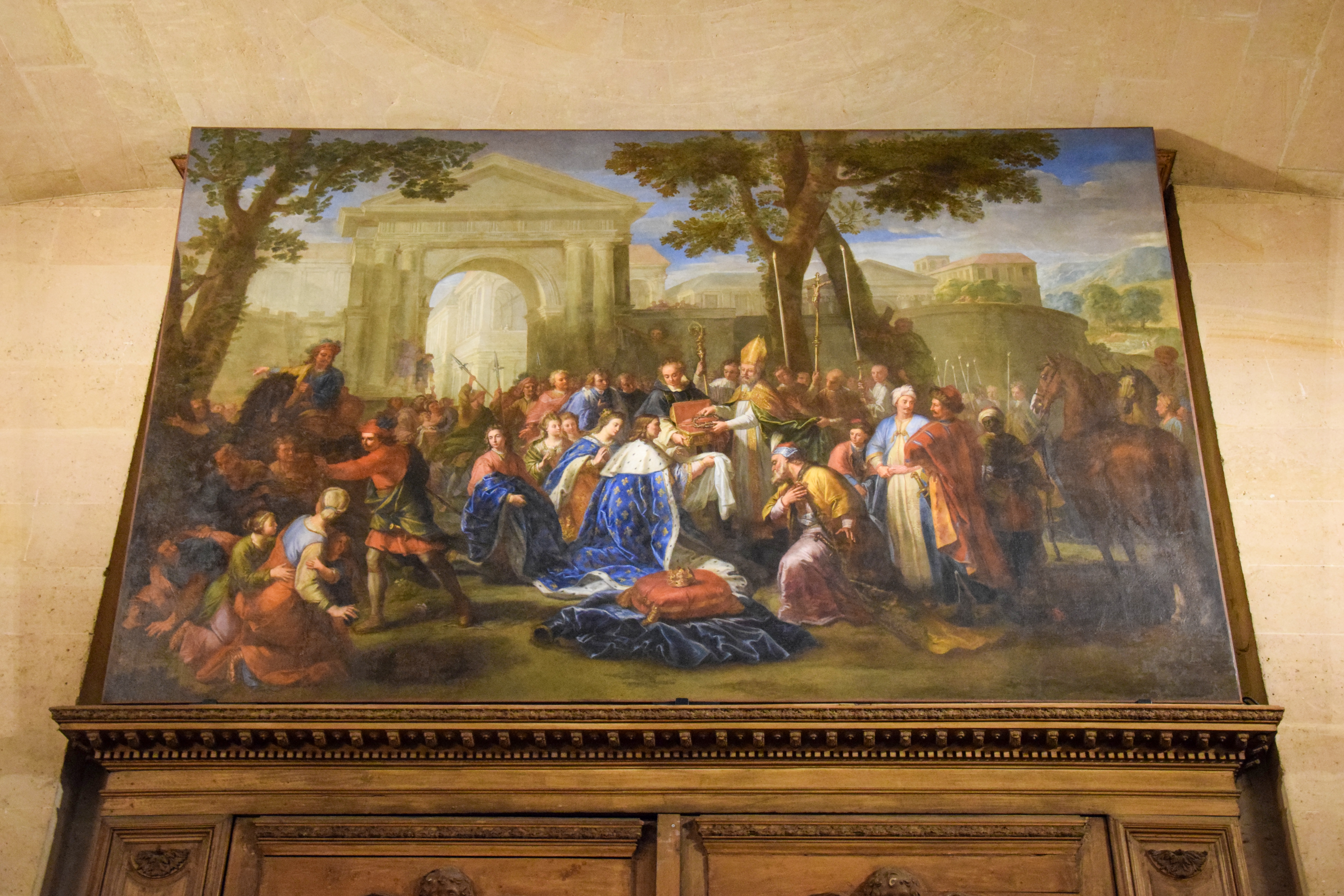
"Saint Louis, accompanied by the Royal Family, receives the Crown of Thorns" by Jean André (1714-1717)

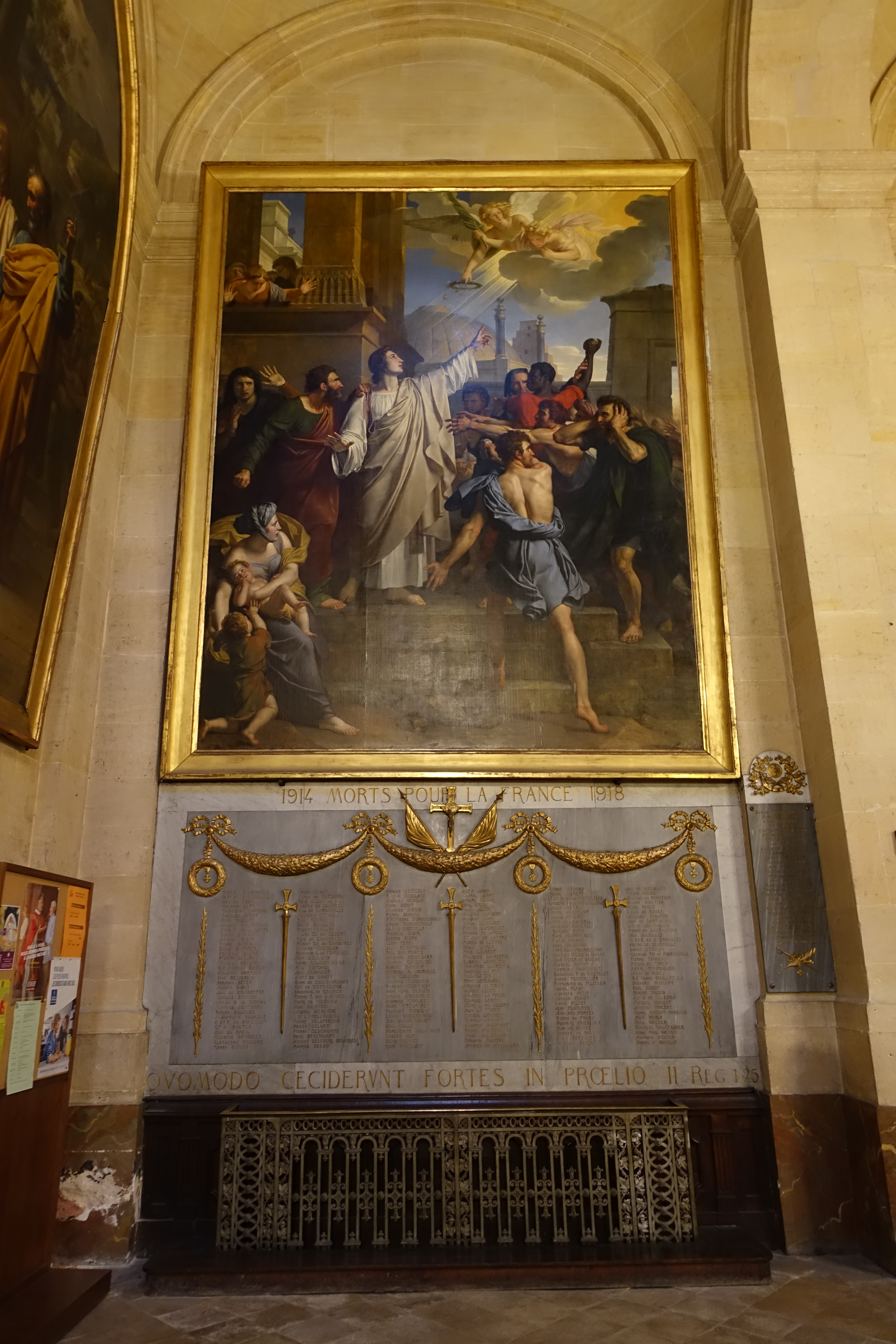
Saint Stephen preaching the gospel by Alexandre Denis Abel de Pujol (1817)

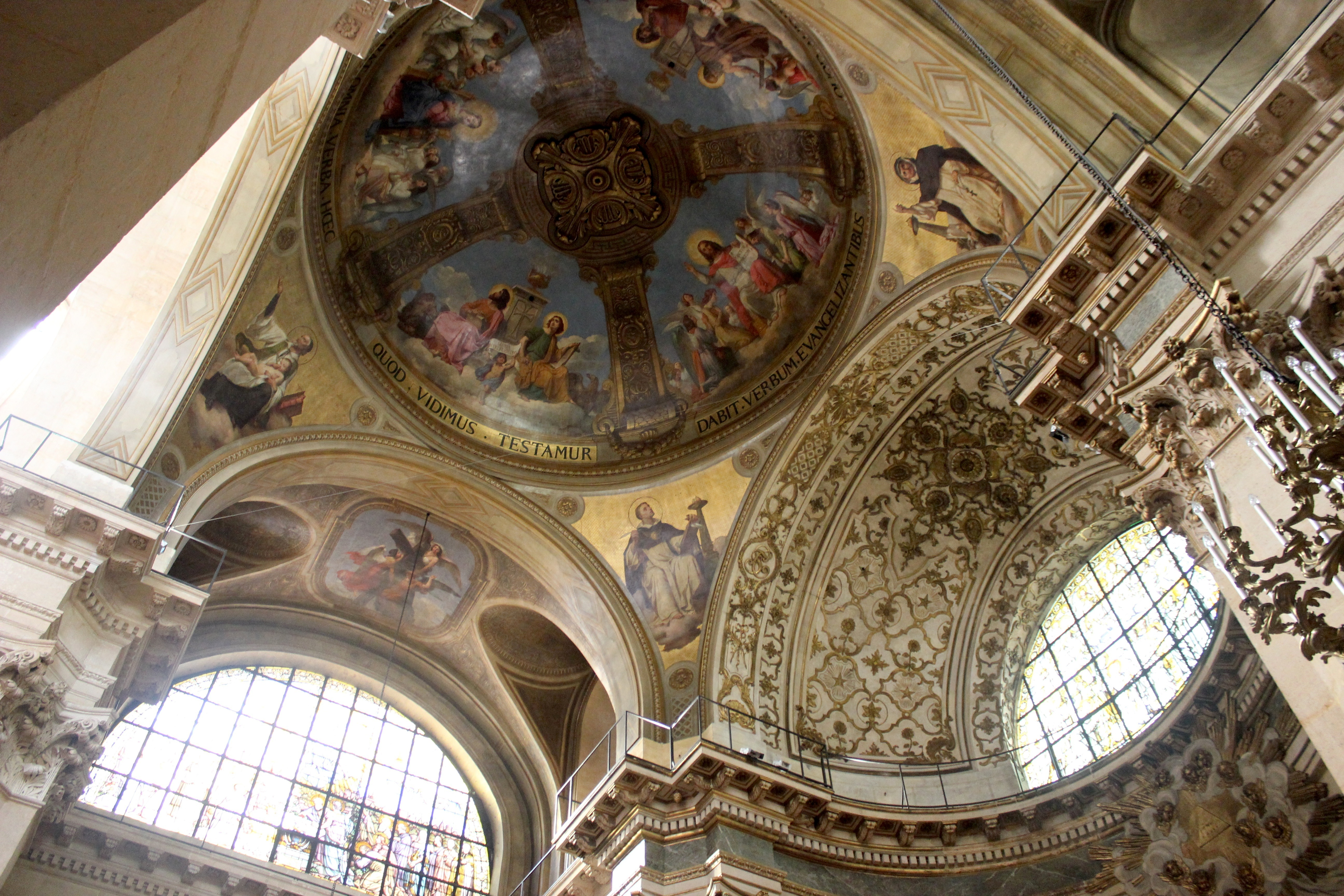
Dome of the choir, with paintings of "Force and Justice" by Merry-Joseph Blondel (1781-1853).

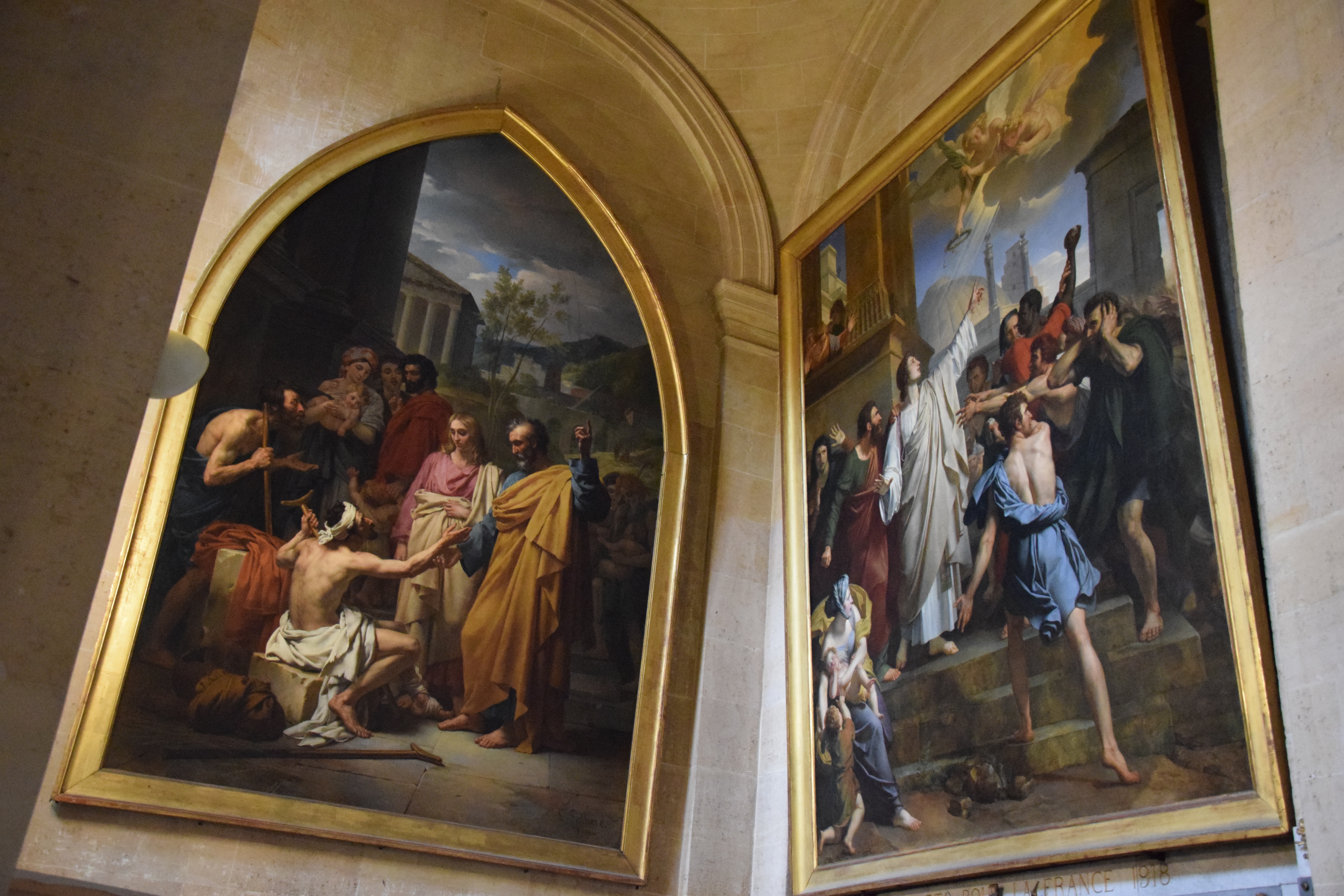
Paintings in the nave and choir

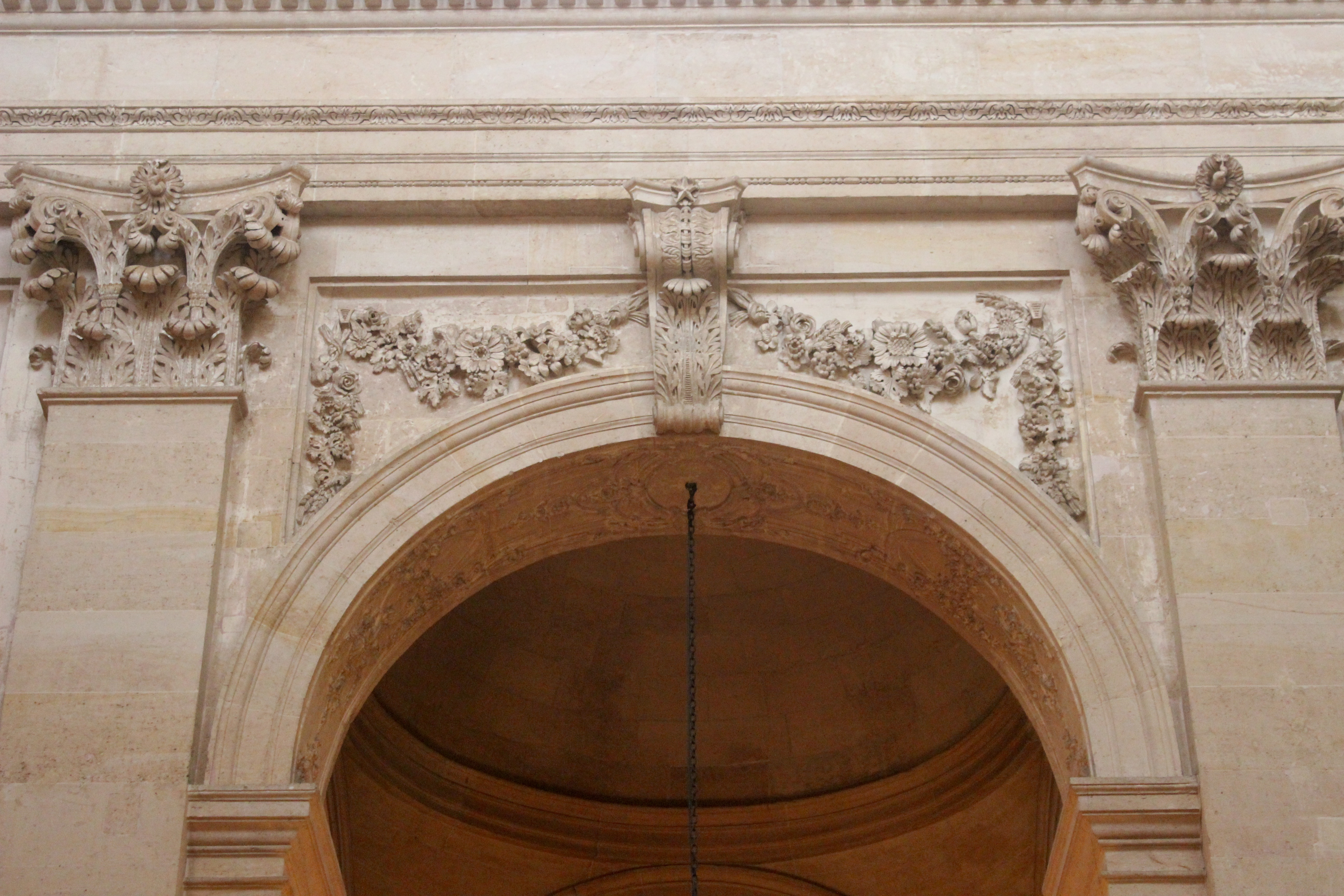
Decoration of nave arcades

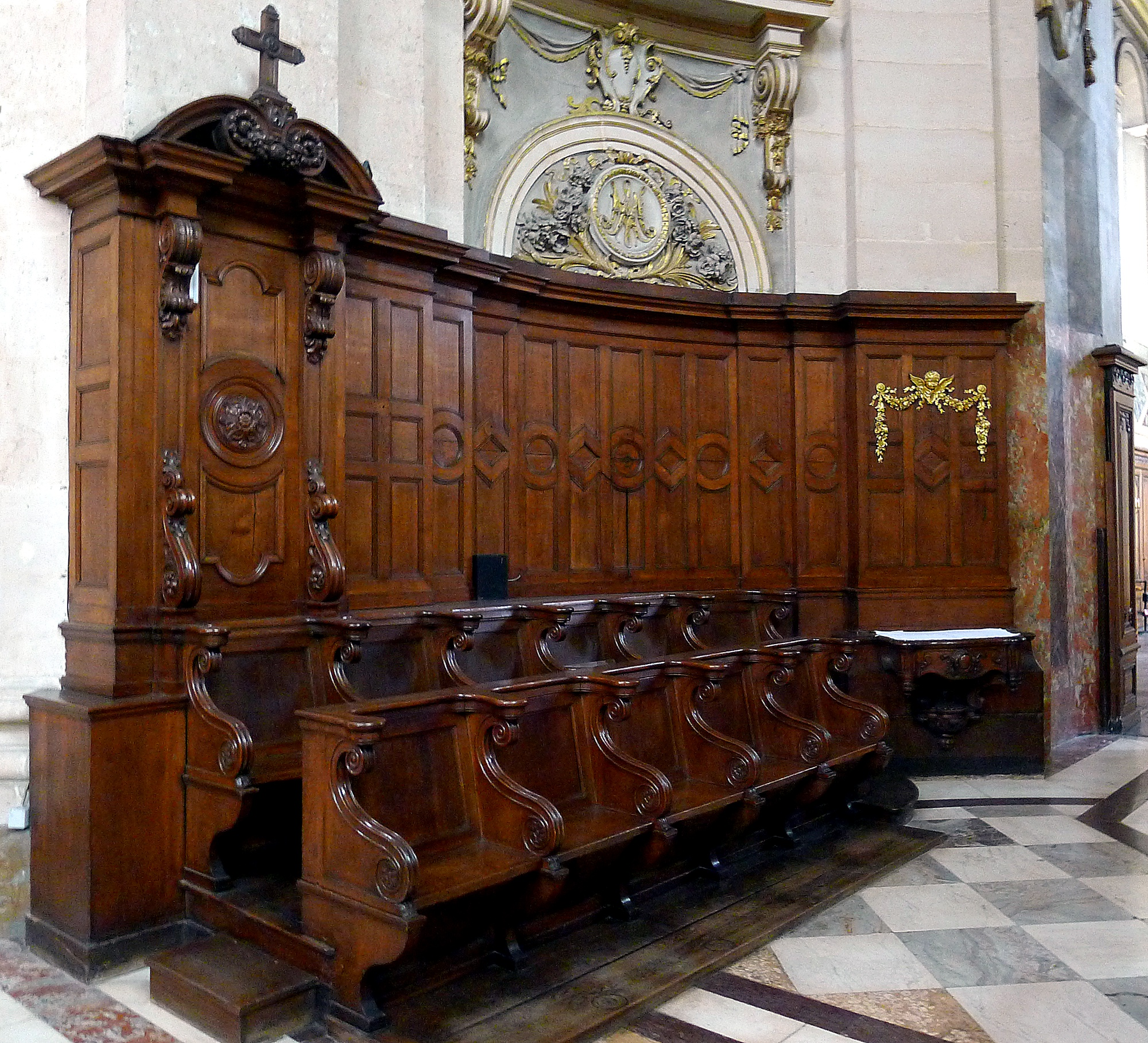
Choir stalls

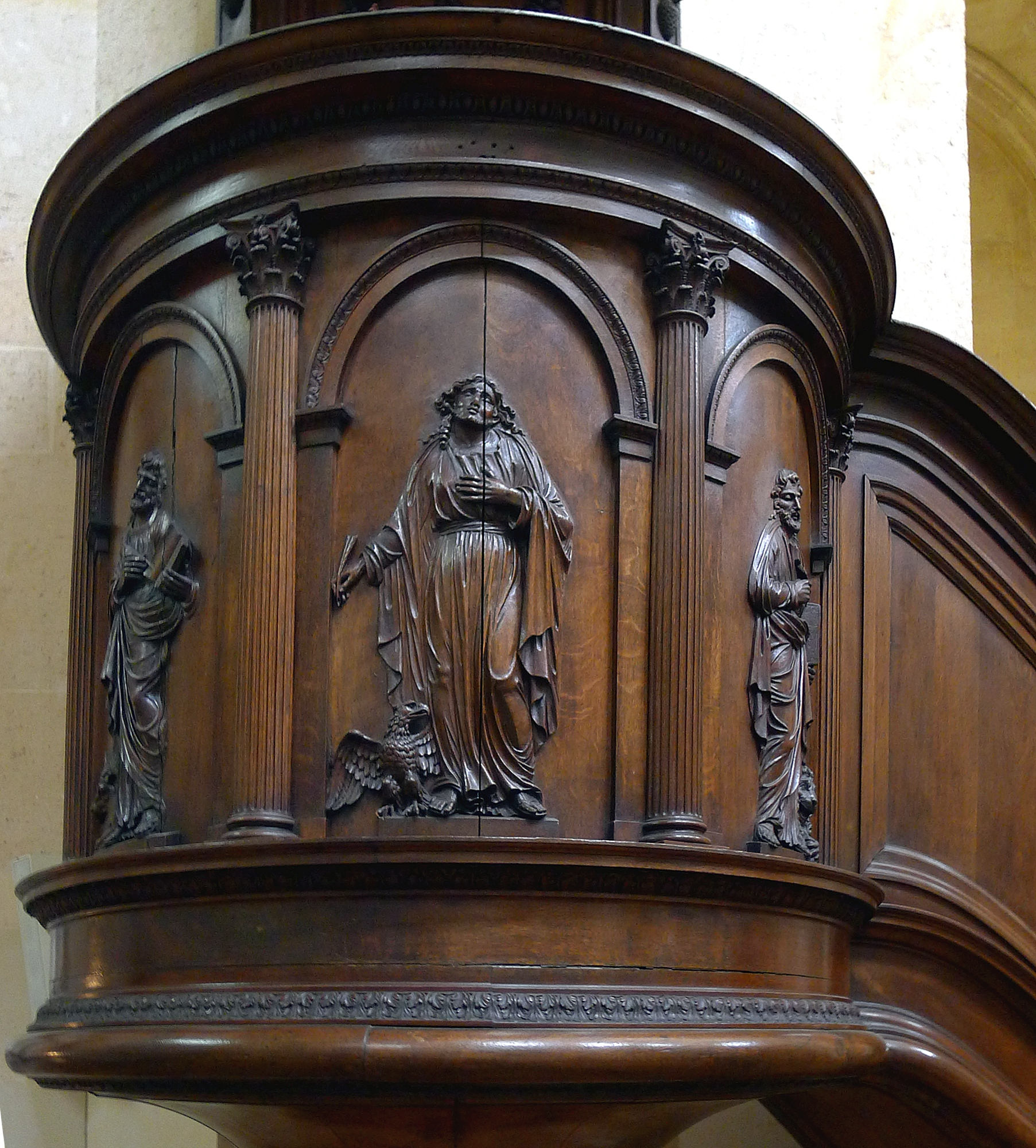
The pulpit (1814)

Merry Joseph Blondel provided decorative ceiling paintings for the church in the 19th century. His decorative work is also found in the Palace of Fontainebleau, the Palace of Versailles, the Louvre Museum, the Brongniart Palace (also known as the Bourse de Paris), the Luxembourg Palace, and the church of Notre-Dame-de-Lorette.

- Organ originally by François-Henri Clicquot (1771)
- Mural paintings by Merry-Joseph Blondel (1841)
- Altar of Saint Vincent de Paul (1848)
- Portrait of Saint Louis by Luc-Olivier Merson, in the chapel of Saint-Louis (1887)
- Stained glass by Dideron and Langlade (1902)

== Bibliography (in French) ==
- Dumoulin, Aline; Ardisson, Alexandra; Maingard, Jérôme; Antonello, Murielle; Églises de Paris (2010), Éditions Massin, Issy-Les-Moulineaux, ISBN 978-2-7072-0683-1
- Hillairet, Jacques; Connaissance du Vieux Paris; (2017); Éditions Payot-Rivages, Paris; (in French). ISBN 978-2-2289-1911-1
