= Salle de la rue des Fossés-Saint-Germain-des-Prés =

Coordinates: 48.85306°N 2.33847°E

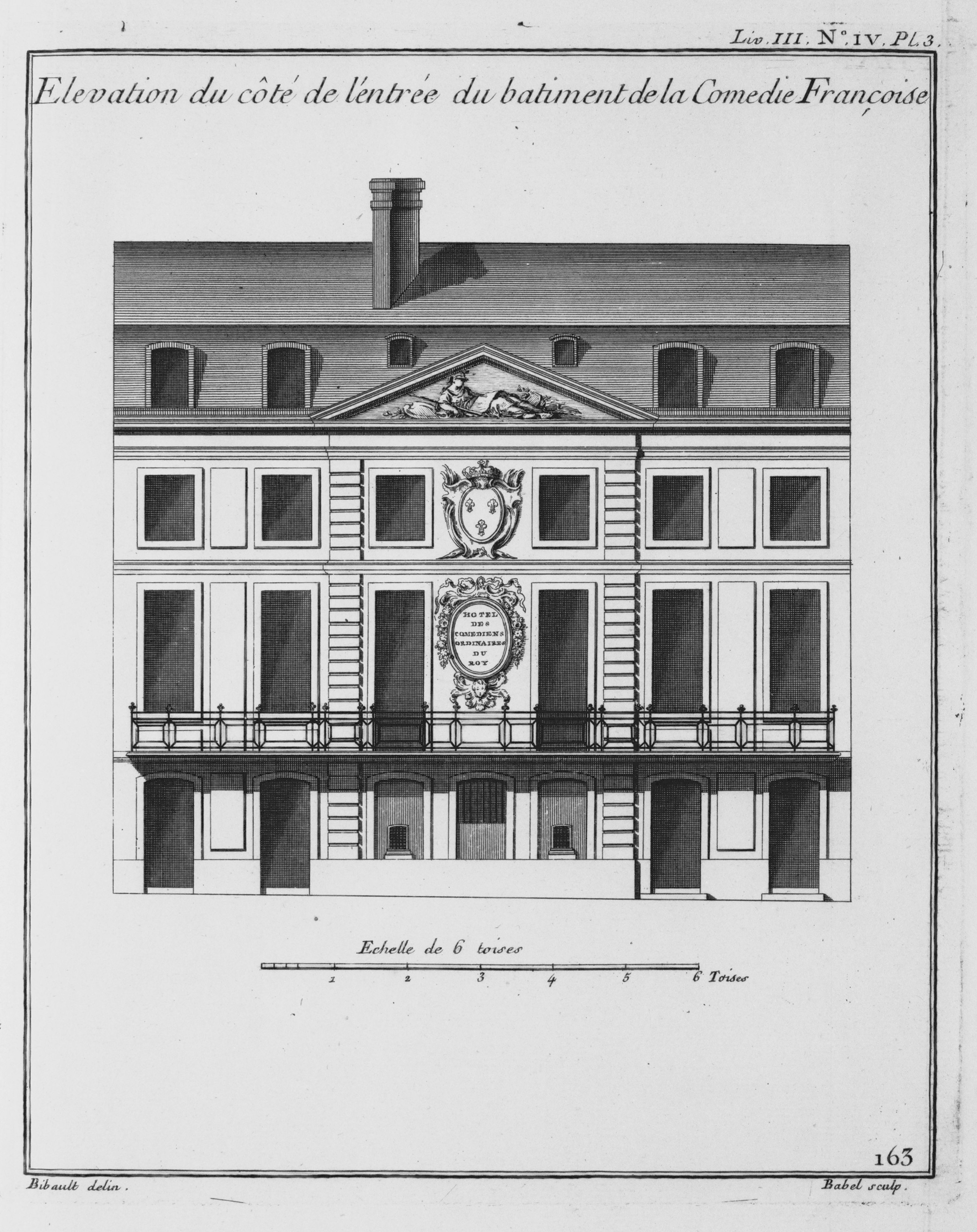
Façade of the theatre as depicted in 1752 in Architecture françoise by Jacques-François Blondel

The Salle de la rue des Fossés-Saint-Germain-des-Prés was the theatre of the Comédie-Française from 1689 to 1770. It was built to the designs of the French architect François d'Orbay on the site of a former indoor tennis court (jeu de paume), located at 14 rue des Fossés-Saint-Germain-des-Prés, now 14 rue de l'Ancienne Comédie, across from the Café Procope in the 6th arrondissement of Paris.

== History ==
Since 1680 the Comédie-Française had been performing in their first theatre, the Hôtel Guénégaud, but because of its proximity to the newly constructed Collège des Quatre-Nations, the company was asked by the school's leaders to move further away to minimise the bad influence of the actors on the students of the college. By an act of 8 March 1688 the actors purchased the Jeu de Paume de l'Étoile on the rue des Fossés-Saint-Germain-des-Prés. They also acquired two adjacent buildings at 17–19 rue des Mauvais-Garçons (now rue Grégoire-de-Tours).

Unlike for most French theatres of the period, the architect François d'Orbay did not convert the tennis court into a theatre, rather the existing building was demolished and a new building was erected on the site. The total cost of the new theatre was 198,433 livres, about one third of which (62,614 livres) was for the purchase of the land and the existing structures.

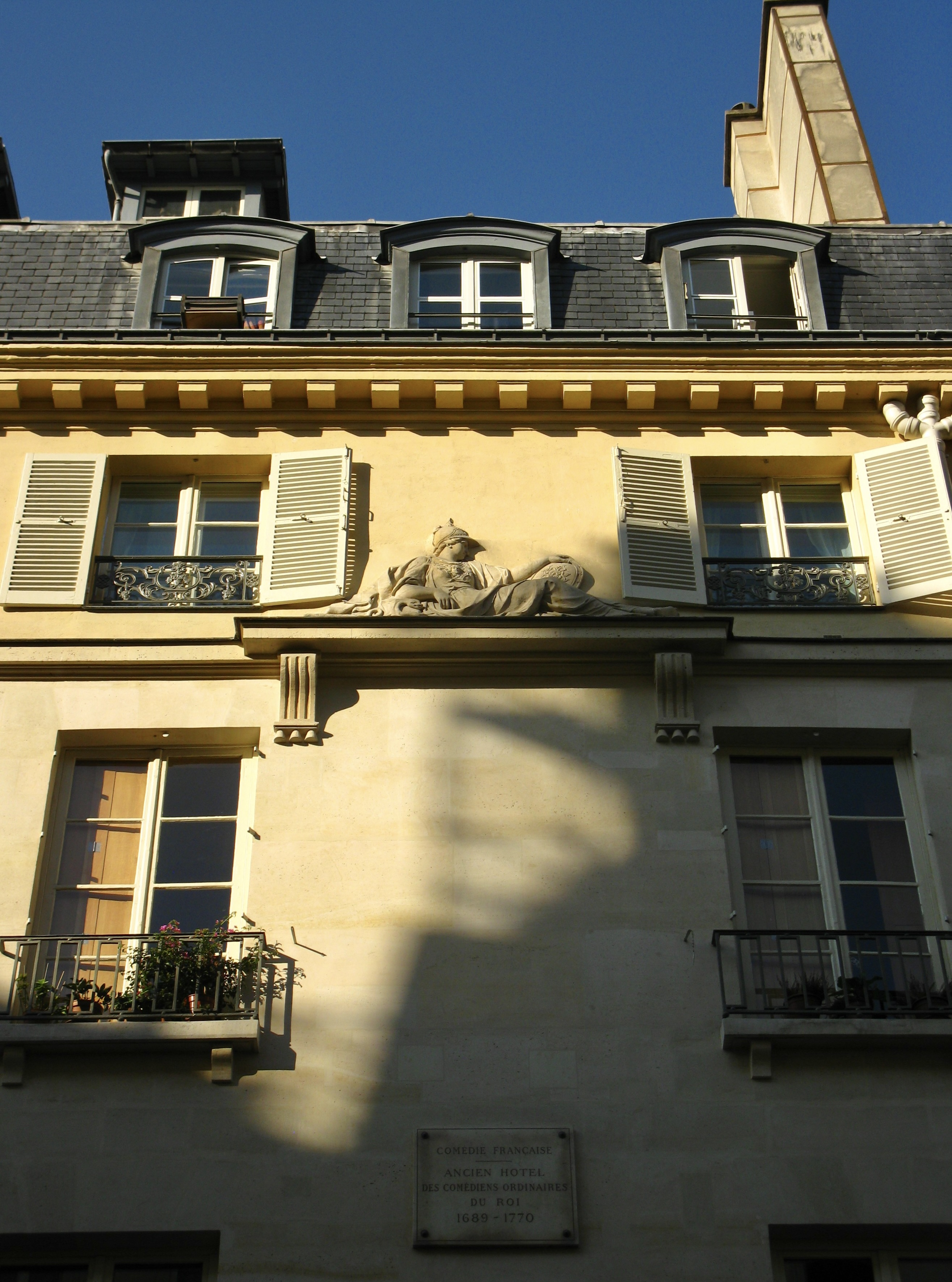
Facade of the current building with the high-relief sculpture of Minerva by Étienne Le Hongre

The theatre was inaugurated on 18 April 1689. Its design is known from documents found at the Archives Nationales and the archives of the Comédie-Française, and from architectural plans published by Jean Mariette after the originals and reproduced by Jacques-François Blondel in his Architecture françoise of 1752. The plans were also re-engraved and published in 1772 in Diderot's Encyclopédie.

D'Orbay fit the theatre into a constricted site that was an irregular quadrilateral with oblique frontage on the rue des Fossés-Saint-Germain-des-Prés. He fit the stage service areas into the ancillary buildings on the irregular terrain to the south.

The façade of cut stone is shown in an engraving from Blondel's book and in the original plans conserved in the archives of the Comédie-Française. It consisted of 7 bays of 3 storeys and an attic with a mansard roof. On the ground floor, in the outer two bays on each side were four doors opening to the interior. The central three bays, topped with a triangular pediment and flanked with rusticated pilasters, formed a grand avant-corps. A high relief sculpture of the goddess Minerva by Étienne Le Hongre decorated the tympanum (interior of the pediment). Le Hongre's sculpture survives, mounted in a similar location on the façade of the current building and declared a monument historique on 29 March 1928. Below the pediment were the Arms of France sculpted in low relief, and below that, at the level of the main floor, a decorative medallion inscribed with the words "Hotel des Comédiens ordinaires du Roy entretenus par Sa Majesté M.D.C.LXXXVIII [Home of the regular Actors of the King supported by His Majesty 1688]". An iron balcony ran along the entire facade, and on the ground floor in the outer bays of the avant-corps were two ticket windows.

Plates from Jacques-François Blondel's Architecture françoise

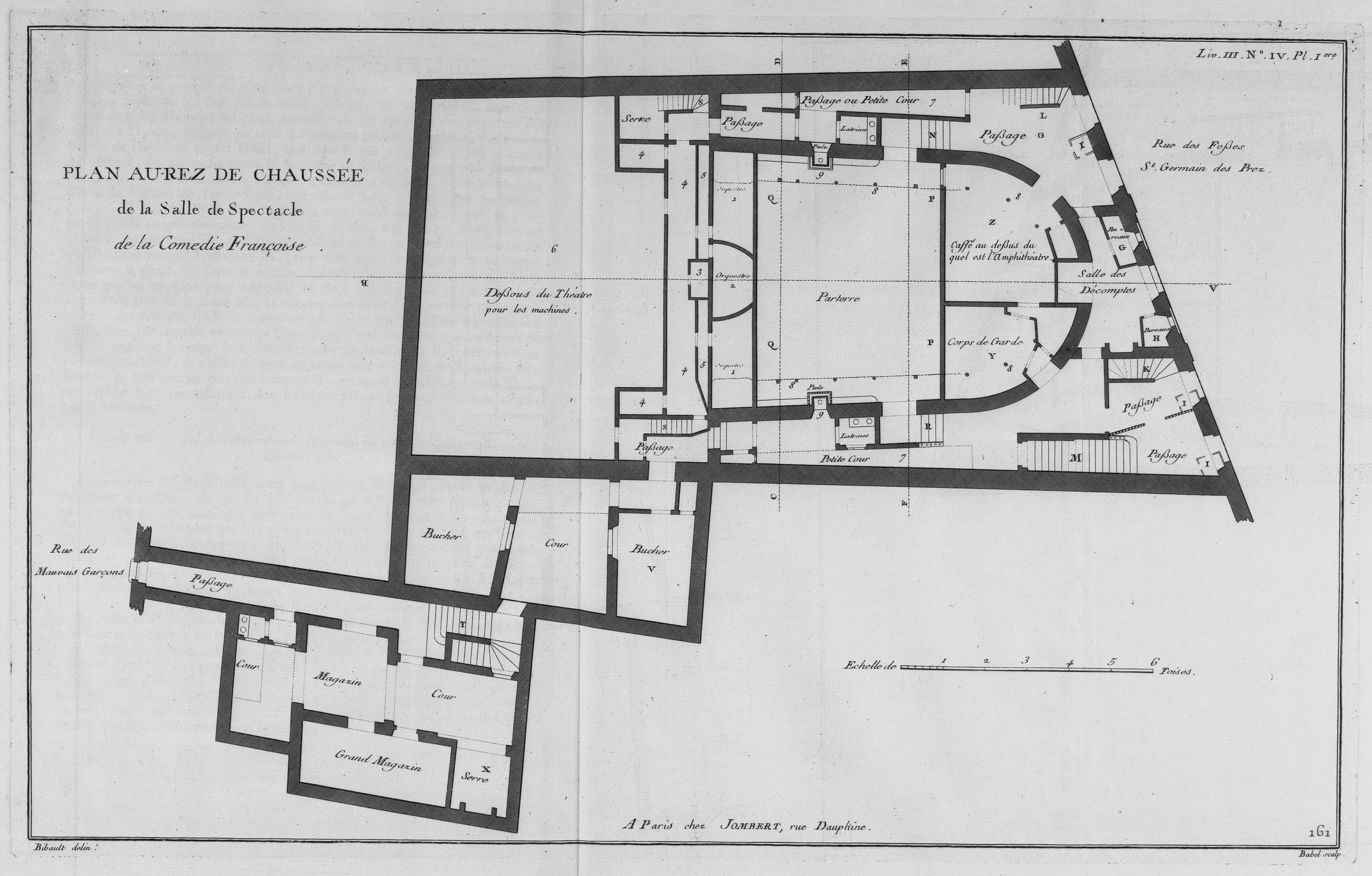
Plan of the ground floor

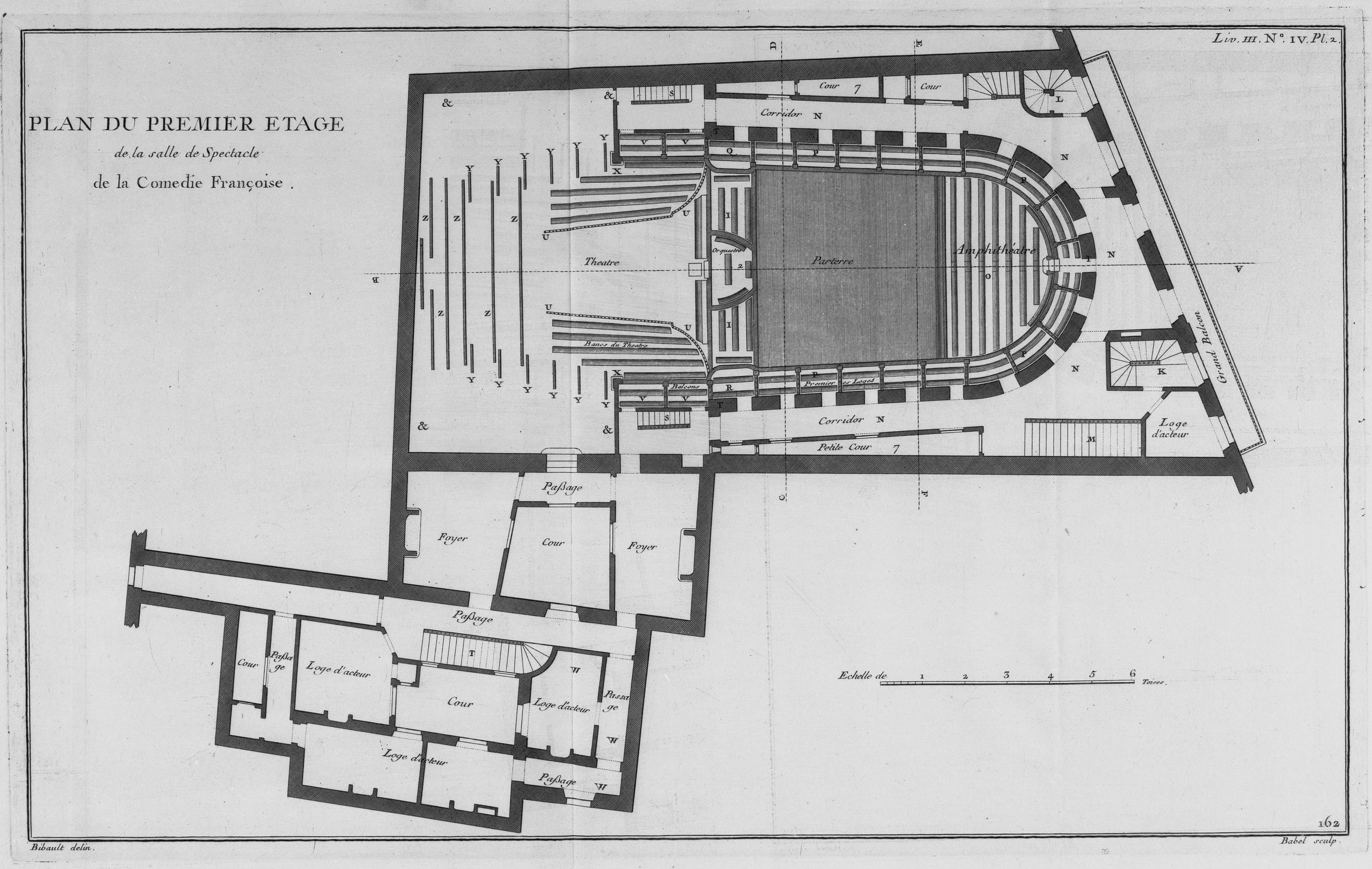
Plan of the main floor
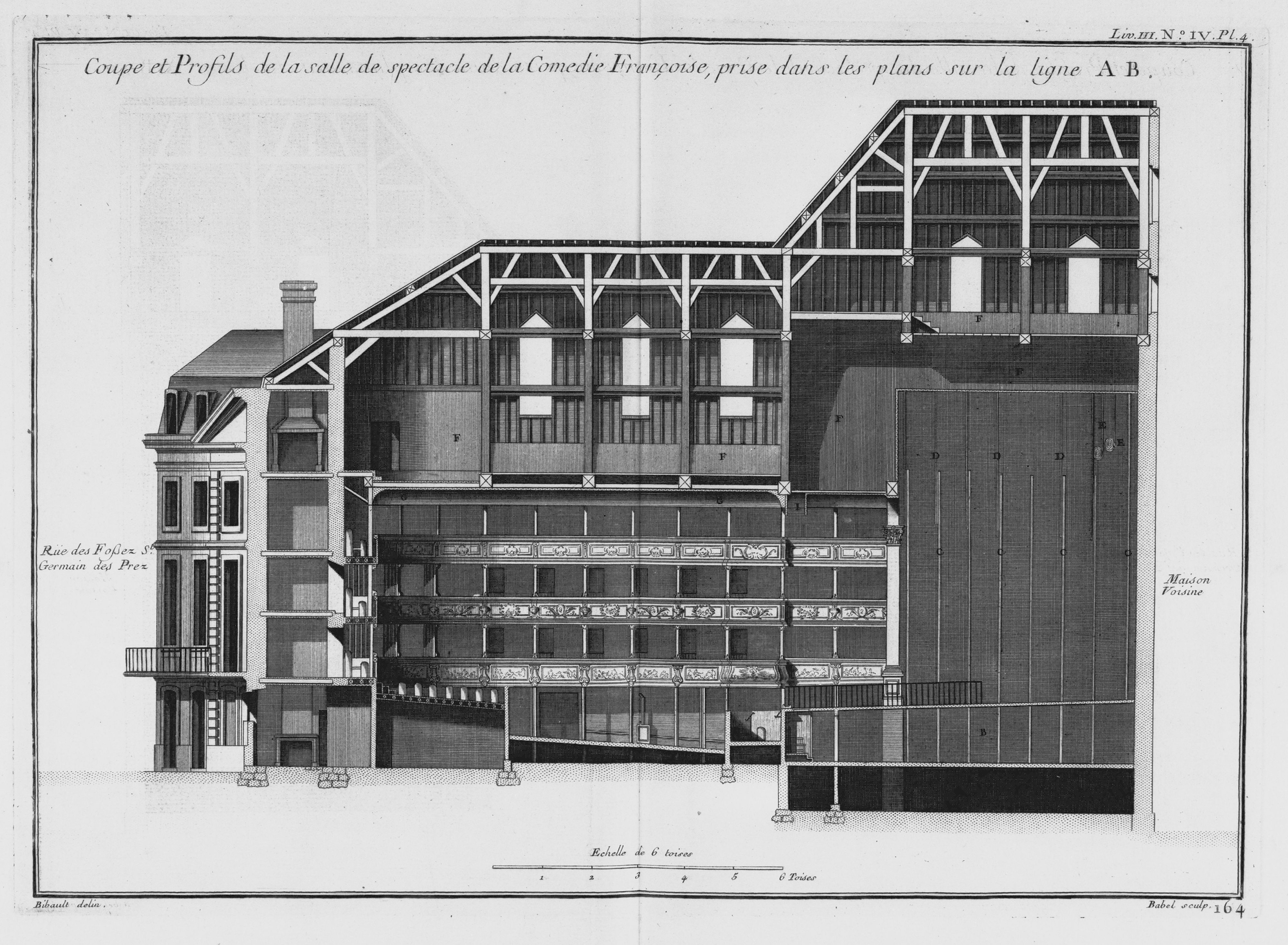
Long section of the theatre

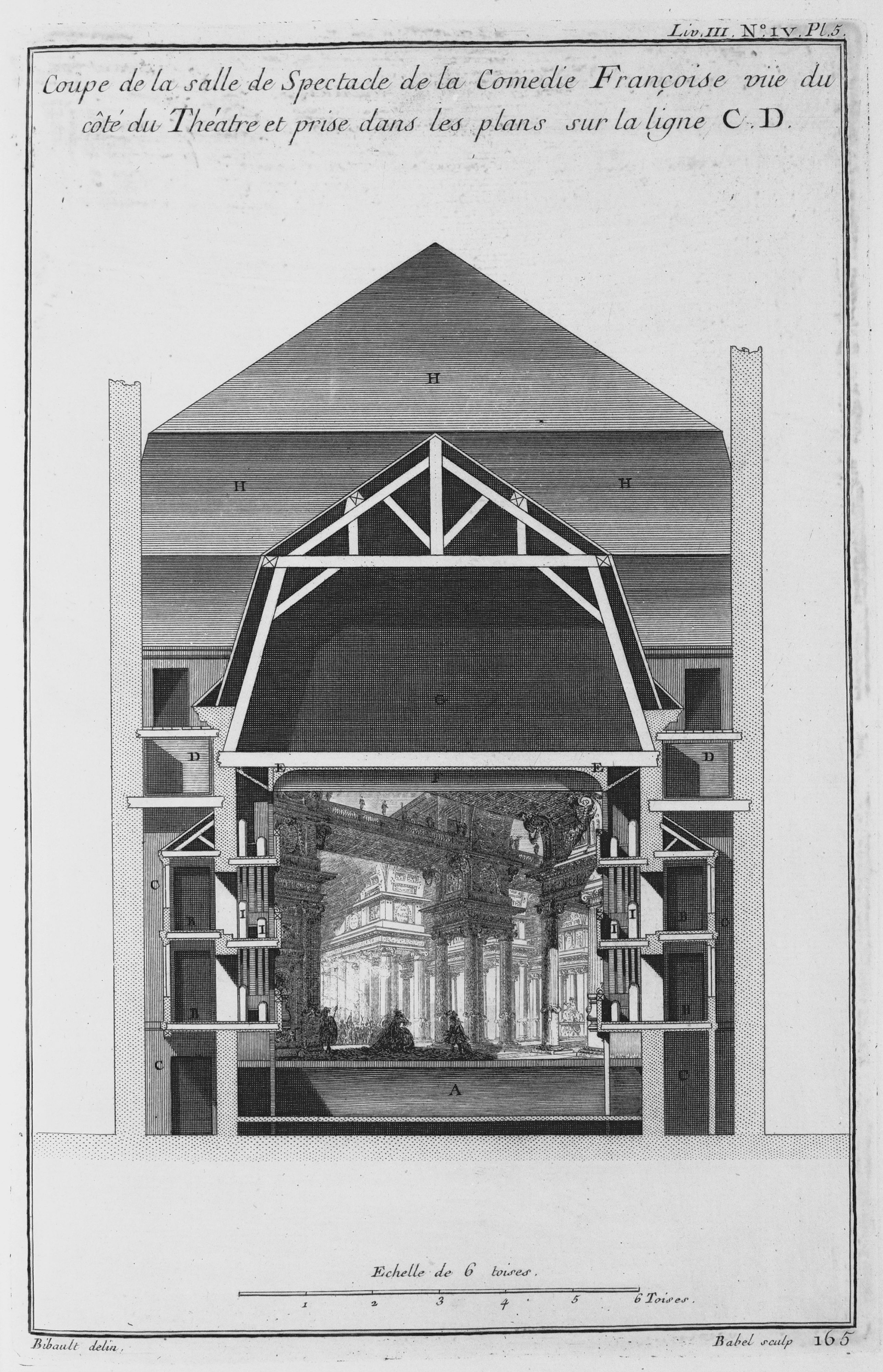
Transverse section with a view of the stage

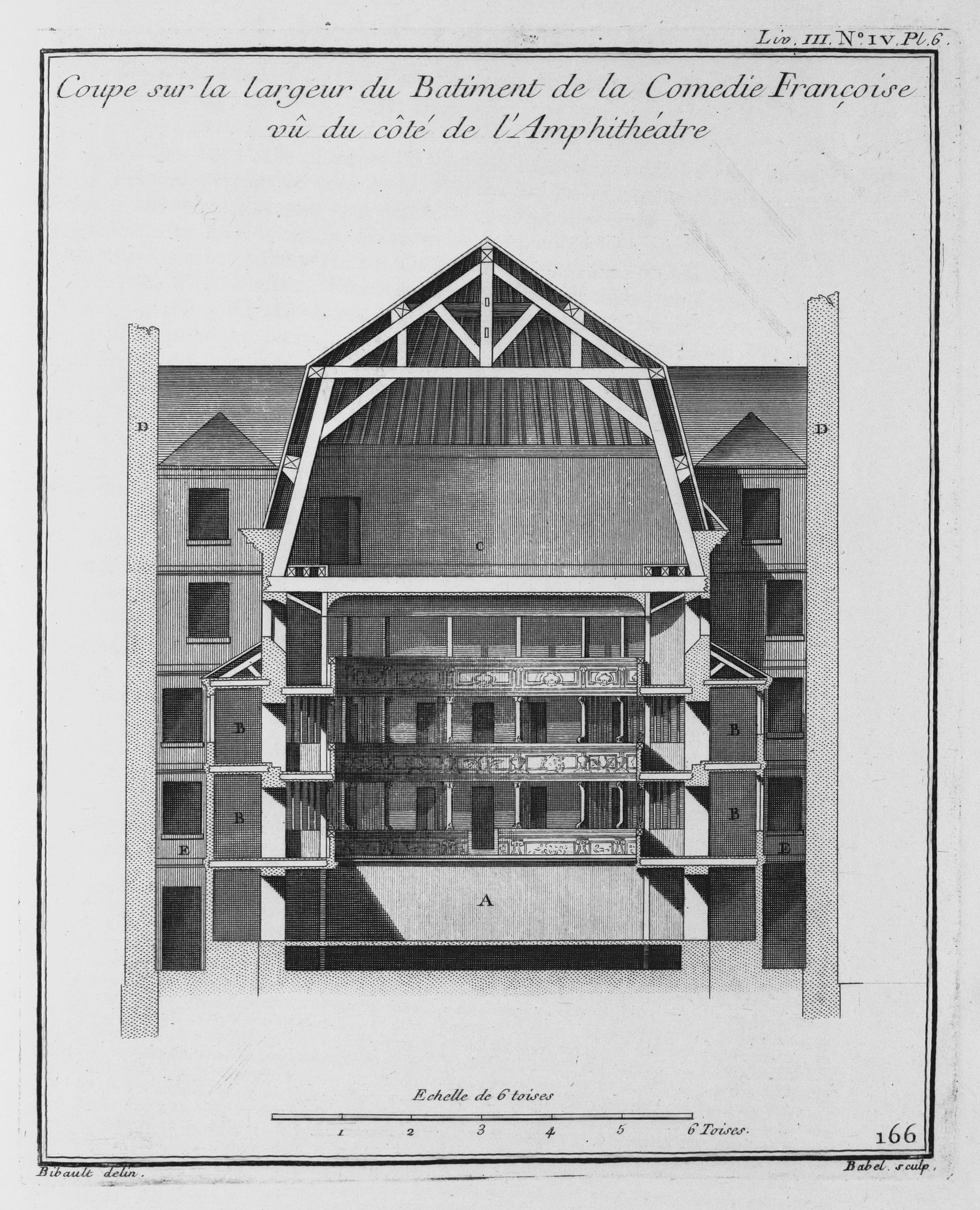
Transverse section with a view toward the balconies

By 1770 the theatre had become too cramped. The last performance was on 31 March 1770, and the company moved to provisional quarters at the Théâtre des Tuileries.

== In popular culture ==
- The theatre is the setting for the first act of Francesco Cilea's opera Adriana Lecouvreur.

== Bibliography ==
- Blondel, Jacques-François (1752). "Description des Bâtiments et du Théâtre de la Comédie Françoise, rue des Fossés St. Germaine des Prés", Volume 2, Book 3, Chapter 4, pp. 14–36, in Architecture françoise. Paris: Charles-Antoine Jombert. Title page at Gallica.
- Bonnassies, Jules (1868). Comédie française. Notice historique sur les anciens bâtiments, no 14 de la rue de l'Ancienne-Comédie... et nos 17 et 19 de la rue Grégoire-de-Tours. Paris: Aug. Aubry. Copy at Gallica.
- Carlson, Marvin (1998). Voltaire and the Theatre of the Eighteenth Century. Westport, Connecticut: Greenwood Press. ISBN 9780387946412.
- Guibert, Noëlle (1998). "Les Fossés-St-Germain, histoire", pp. 54–57, in Paris et ses théâtres: architecture et décor, edited by Béatrice de Andia. Paris: Action Artistique de la Ville de Paris. ISBN 9782905118981.
- Loupiac, Claude (1998). "Les Fossés-St-Germain, architecture", pp. 58–59, in Paris et ses théâtres: architecture et décor, edited by Béatrice de Andia. Paris: Action Artistique de la Ville de Paris. ISBN 9782905118981.
- Registers Project (c. 2015). "Salle de la rue des Fossés-Saint-Germain-des-Près, 1689-1770" (archive copy of 11 April 2016). Paris: Comédie-Française.
- Wild, Nicole (2012). Dictionnaire des théâtres parisiens (1807–1914). Lyon: Symétrie. ISBN 9782914373487. OCLC 826926792.
