= Pierre Le Gros =

Pierre Le Gros refers to one of two French sculptors, father and son:

- Pierre Le Gros the Elder, 1629–1714
- Pierre Le Gros the Younger, 1666–1719
