= Gaspard and Balthazard Marsy =

French sculptors

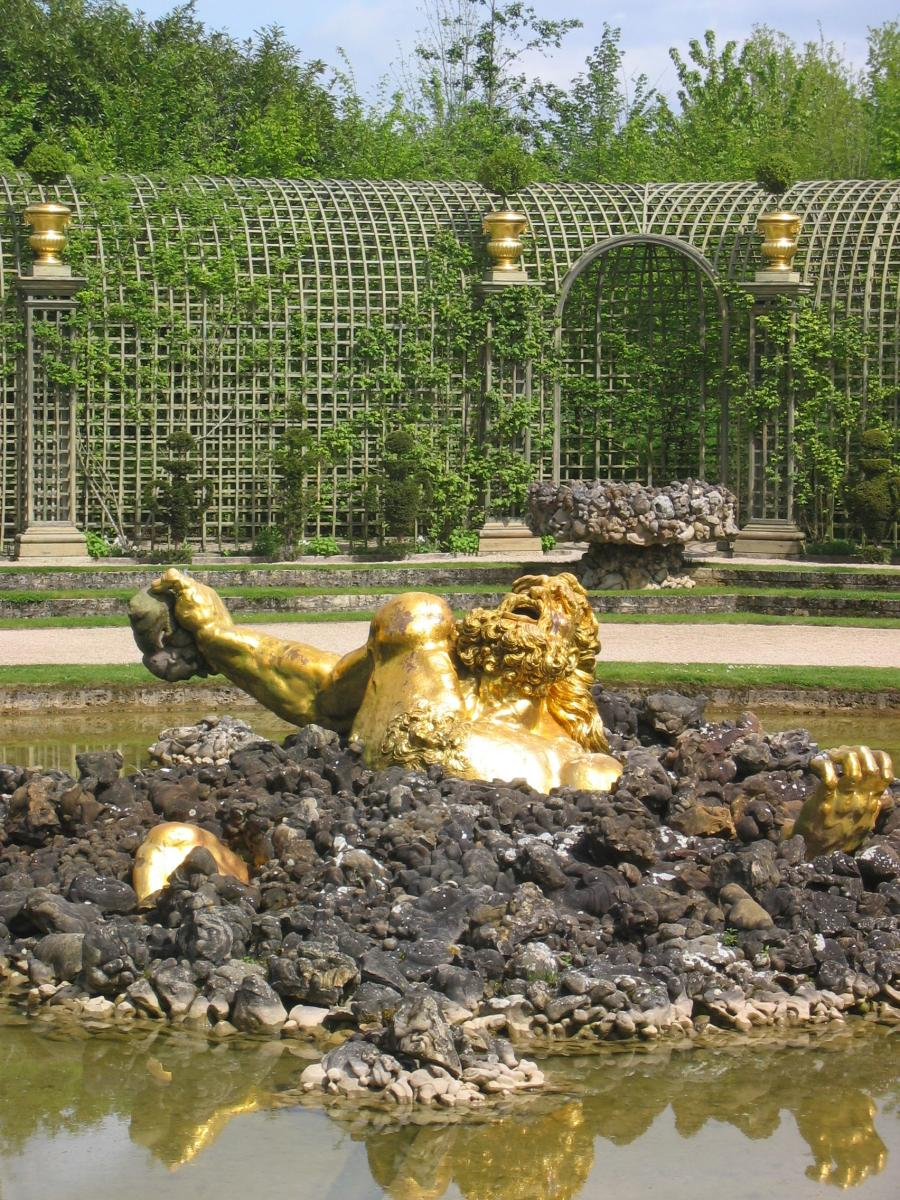
Gaspard Marsy's gilt-bronze figure of the giant Enceladus from Greek mythology (the Bassin d'Encelade; 1675–1677), gardens at Versailles, France.

The brothers Gaspard (born 1624 or 1625, died 10 December 1681) and Balthazar Marsy (baptised 6 January 1628, died May 1674) were French sculptors. Originally from Cambrai, they moved to Paris and were employed by King Louis XIV, particularly for the decoration of the palace and gardens at Versailles.

Their sister Jeanne was married to the sculptor Pierre Le Gros the Elder and was the mother of the sculptor Pierre Le Gros the Younger.

== Works ==
- Bassin d'Encelade (Basin of Enceladus; 1675–1677), gardens of Versailles
- Apollo's horses groomed by two Tritons, ca. 1670, gardens of Versailles
