= Étienne Le Hongre =

French sculptor (1628–1690)

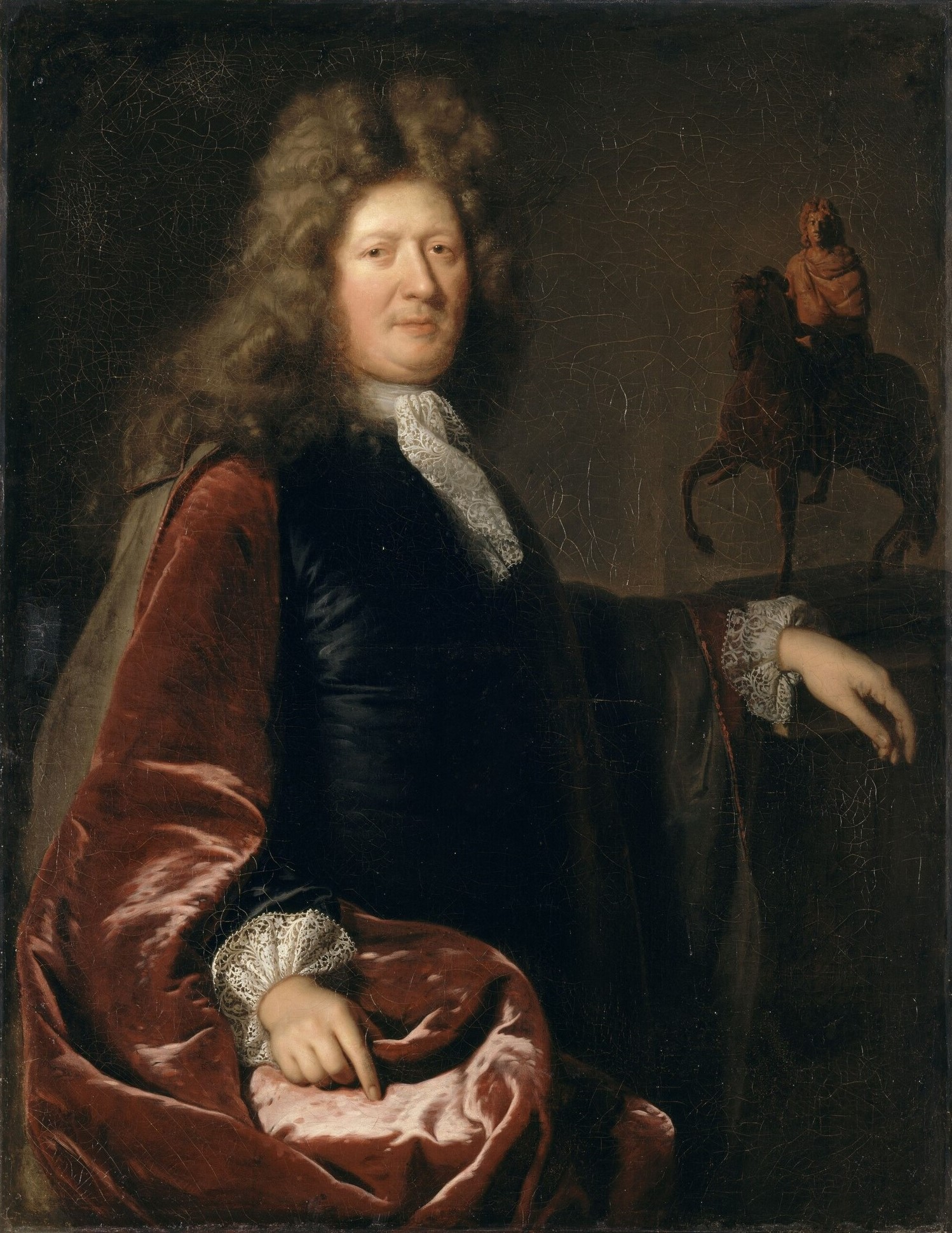
Posthumous portrait by André Bouys, 1691. Next to Le Hongre is a miniature reproduction of his last commission, an equestrian statue of King Louis XIV

Étienne Le Hongre (French pronunciation: [etjɛn lə ɔ̃ɡʁ]; 7 May 1628 – 28 April 1690) was a French sculptor, part of the team that worked for the Bâtiments du Roi at Versailles. Le Hongre was one of the first generation of sculptors formed by the precepts of the Académie royale de peinture et de sculpture. At the Bain des Nymphes (1678–80) he was one of the sculptors providing lead bas-reliefs for the fountain setting that featured the work of François Girardon. Le Hongre provided other bronze figures for the Parterre d'Eau (illustration, right).

== Early life ==
Le Hongre was born in Paris, the son of a menuisier, a carver of furniture and boiseries. He trained in the atelier of Jacques Sarrazin along with Gaspard and Balthazar Marsy and Pierre Le Gros the Elder, all of whom later worked at Versailles. He was accepted (agréé) at the Académie in June 1653 and went to Rome, provided by the king with a purse of 500 livres; he returned to Paris in 1659. He was accepted as a member of the Académie in April 1667 and taught in the Academy schools as an assistant professor (1670), full professor (1676) and assistant rector (1686), which afforded him the lodgings in the Galeries du Louvre where he died.

== Career ==
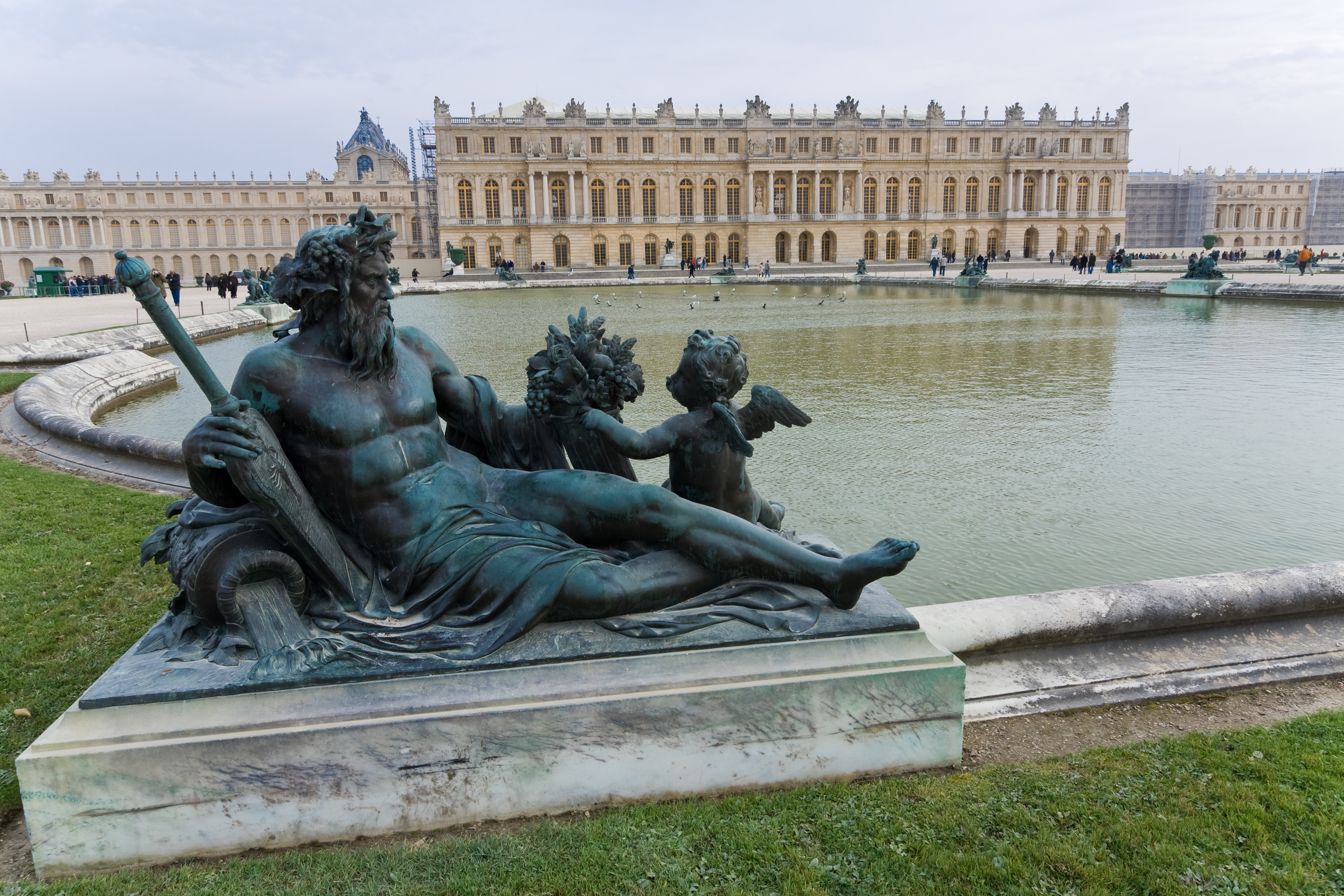
The Seine in the Parterre d'Eau, Versailles

Etienne Le Hongre provided decorative architectural sculpture throughout his career: at the Palais du Louvre he was paid 180 livres in 1663, executed pediment trophies on the exterior of the Galerie d'Apollon facing the Seine, 1667, sculpted friezes and masques (working with Jean-Baptiste Tuby) for the facade now facing the rue de Rivoli, 1668, and provided capitals and sculpted detail for the Louvre Colonnade, 1668–70, for which he received in total 2910 livres. As he showed his skill he was commissioned to sculpt a large figure of Peace for the garden front of the Tuileries, 1666. At Versailles, full-size sculptures were delivered by Le Hongre among many for the Grand cour: Thetis, Plenty, Authority and Africa.

He also worked at the Samaritaine building at the Pont Neuf and at the Château de Choisy. He provided stucco figures and reliefs for the Chapel at the Palais du Luxembourg. Working under the direction of the architect François d'Orbay, he provided bas-reliefs in stucco and carved doors for the church of the Premonstratensians in the Faubourg Saint-Germain, Paris.

Garden sculptures for the royal châteaux also occupied him and his assistants through his career. He provided a March and a September for a series of Months at Fontainebleau (1669), a pair of vases for the Grand Trianon (1671). For the facade facing the Orangerie at Versailles he provided appropriate statues of Zephyr, Flora Vertumnus and Pomona, medallions of Vertumnus and Pomona, and five bas-reliefs of putti engaged in gardening chores (1671). He provided sculptures representing motifs from Aesop's Fables for the small fountains in the Labyrinth (1672–73) and much similar work.

His sculptures for the funerary monument to the heart of Louis de Cossé, duc de Brissac (died 1661), for the Orléans chapel in the church of the Celestins, dismantled at the Revolution, are conserved at the Louvre Museum; they consist of a column and two mourning figures. None of his funerary monuments survive in situ. Nor do his eight suns in glory of gilded lead for the belltower of the Sainte-Chapelle, removed at the Revolution.

In 1670-74 Le Hongre provided sculptural decorations for the great doors and the high altar in the chapel of the Collège des Quatre-Nations, Paris, and was one of Antoine Coysevox's collaborators on the funerary monument of Cardinal Mazarin which was still in process of completion at Le Hongre's death.

His last major commission, an equestrian sculpture of Louis XIV intended for the Place Royale at Dijon was unfinished at his death. The founders, Roger Schabol and François Aubry, both sculptors in their own right, eventually had to sue Le Hongre's heirs for compensation. Contemporaneous bronze reductions of the monument exist. He died in his apartments in the Galeries du Louvre and was buried in the church of St Germain l'Auxerrois. His portrait by André Bouys is conserved in the Musée National du château de Versailles.

== Surviving sculptures ==
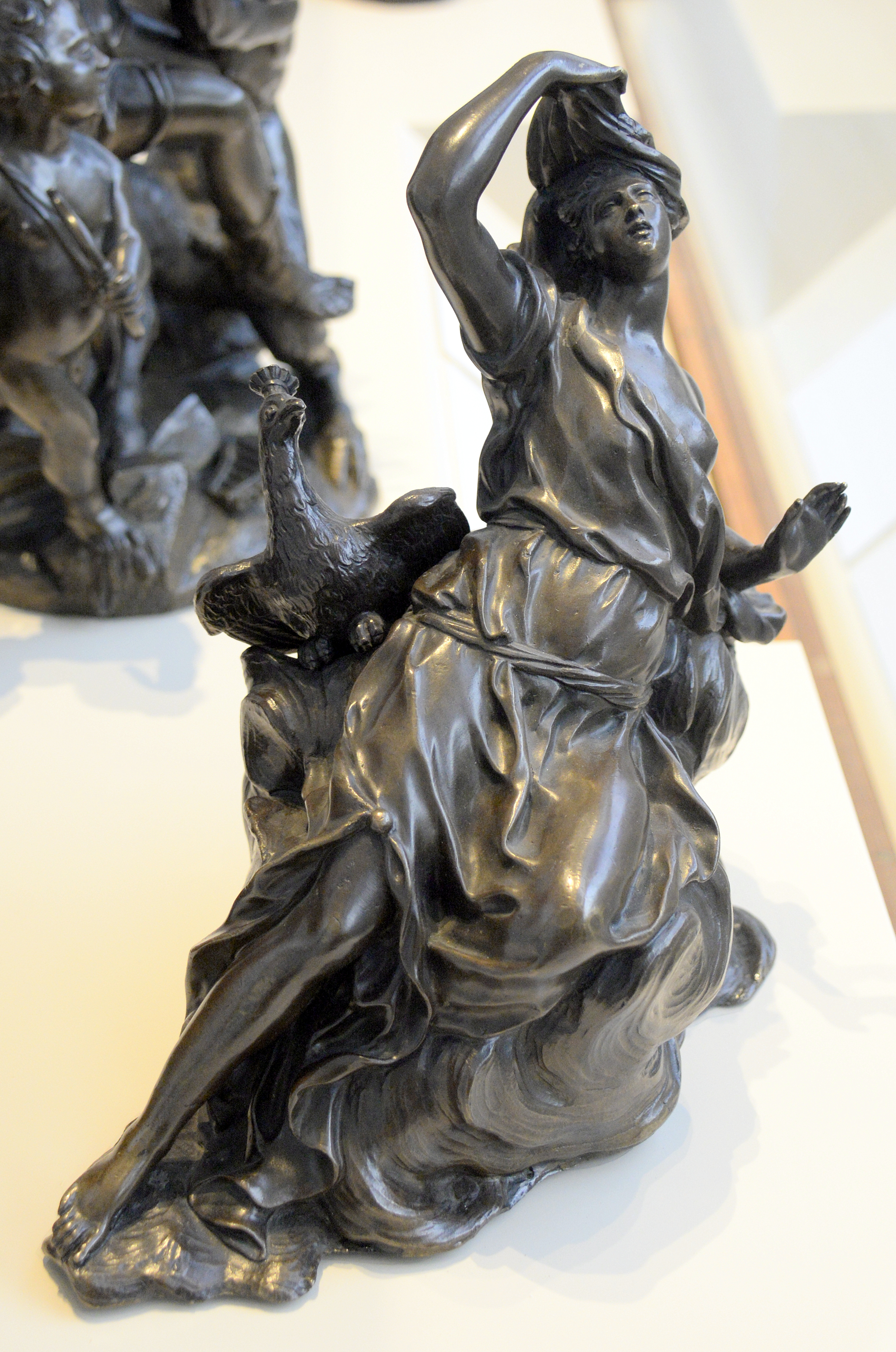
Juno and the peacock. Juno sits on a cloud with her peacock. Part of a bronze group attributed to Étienne Le Hongre, France, c. 1680-1690. National Museum of Scotland, Edinburgh

- Mary Magdalene, oval bas-relief medallion, marble, 1667 (L) This was his morceau de reception for the Académie. Formerly decorating the staircase in the Académie's quarters in the Louvre, it was moved to the church of Notre-Dame at Versailles in 1815 (Chapel of St. Vincent de Paul).
- Architectural sculpture for the Palais du Louvre, 1663, 1667-70 (L)
- Funerary monument for Louis de Cossé, duc de Brissac, Orléans (Musée du Louvre)
- Kneeling figure for the funerary monument of Louis Potier, marquis de Gesvres (L) (Musée de Versailles)
- Two Loves and a Nymph, bronze, 1670 (model), 1688 (cast) (L) (Gardens of Versailles)
- Two Tritons and two Sirens, lead, 1669-71 (L) (North Parterre, Gardens of Versailles)
- Rivers and Putti for the Parterre d'Eau,
