= François d'Orbay =

French architect

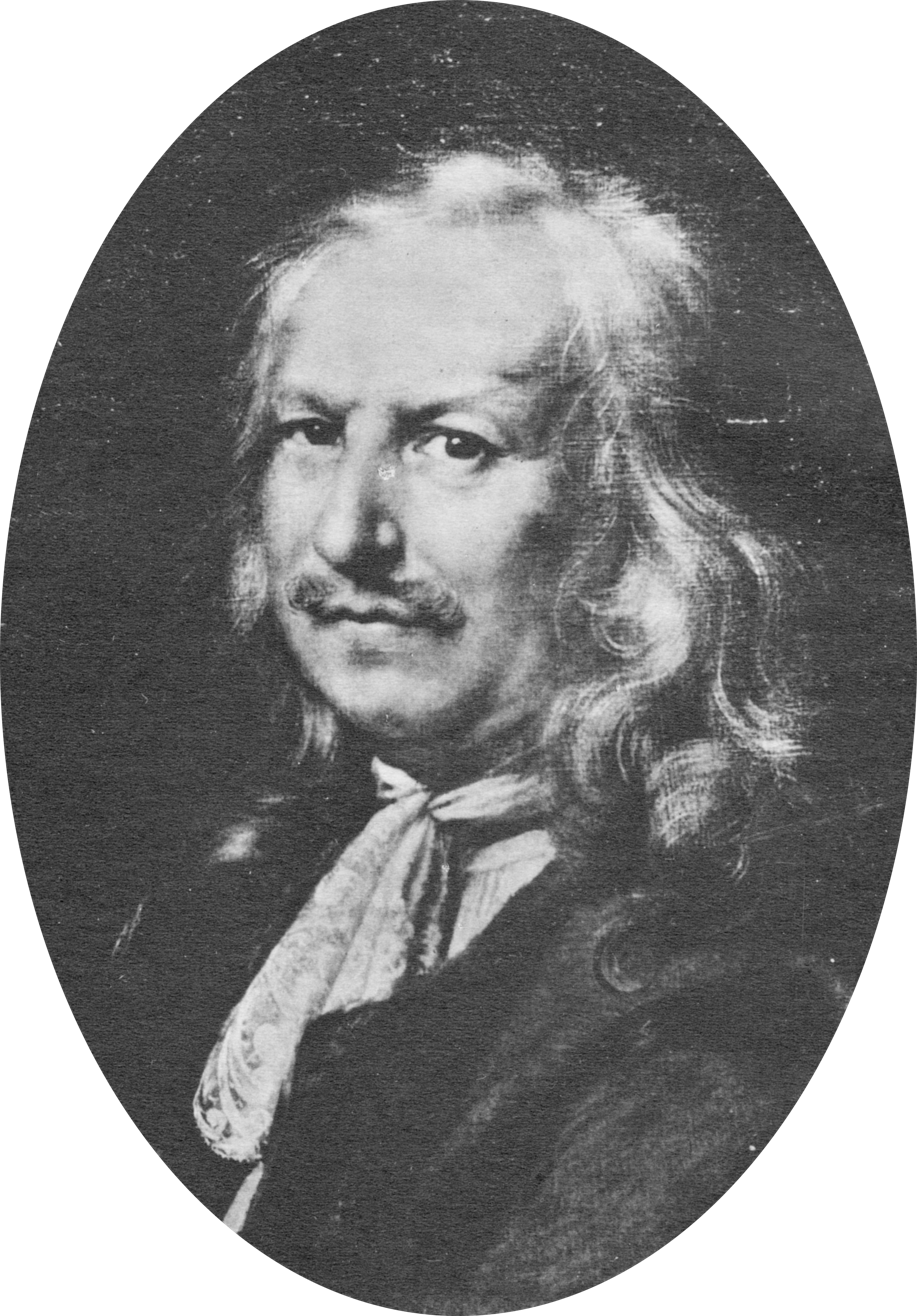
François d'Orbay

François d'Orbay (French pronunciation: [fʁɑ̃swa dɔʁbɛ]; 1634–1697) was a French architectural draughtsman and architect who worked closely with Louis Le Vau and Jules Hardouin Mansart. In 1671 d'Orbay became a founding member of the Académie Royale d'Architecture.

== Early training and career ==
D'Orbay was born in Paris and likely received his early training as an architect from his father, who was a master mason and entrepreneur. In the late 1650s he became an assistant to the architect Louis Le Vau, when the latter was working on the Château de Vincennes.

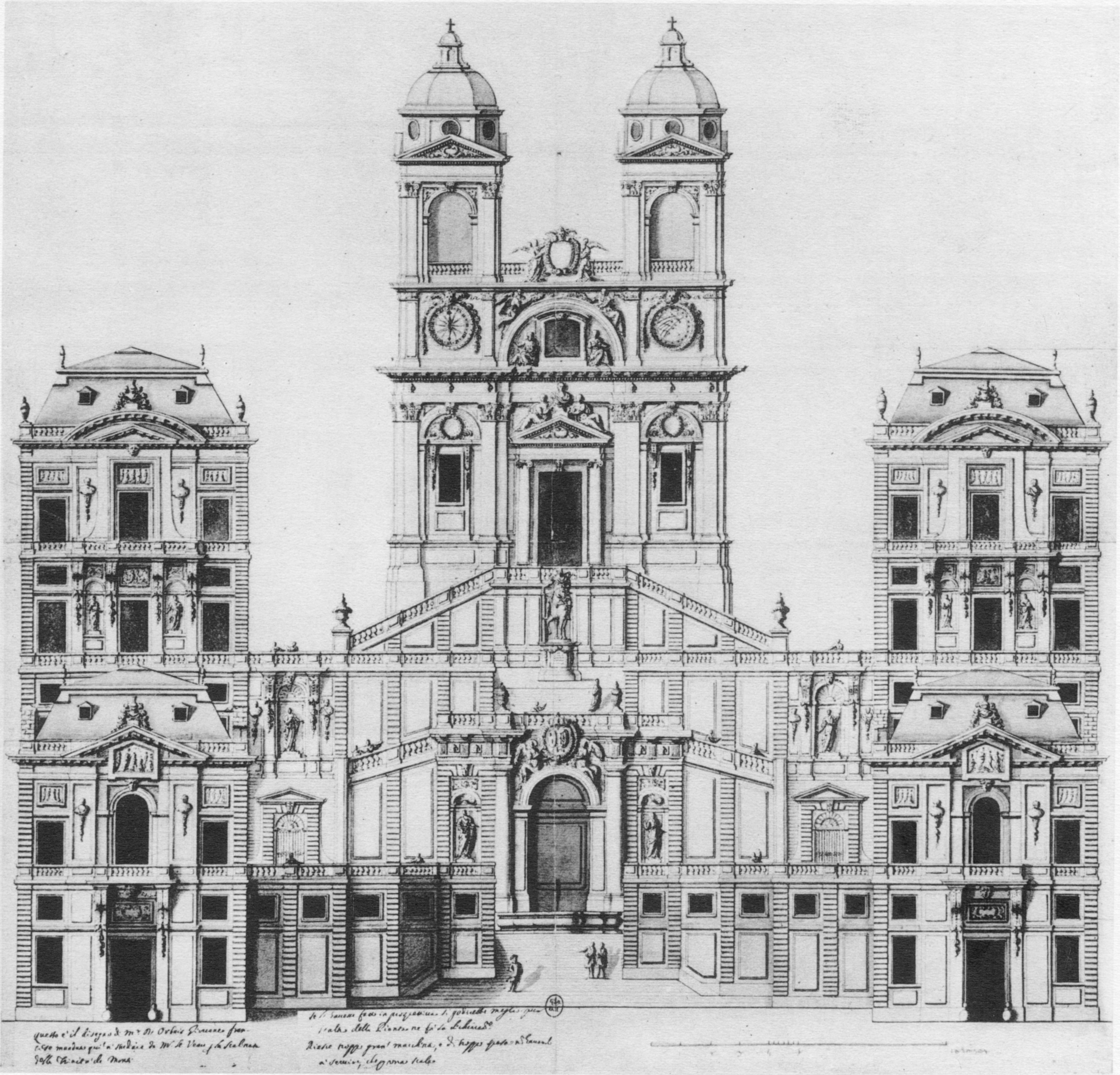
Project for Trinità dei Monti in Rome, 1660

In 1660 Le Vau sent d'Orbay to Rome for further study. While in Rome, d'Orbay created an ambitious but unexecuted design for a stair in front of the Trinità dei Monti, as well as three buildings adjacent to the church. He probably returned to Paris before the end of 1660.

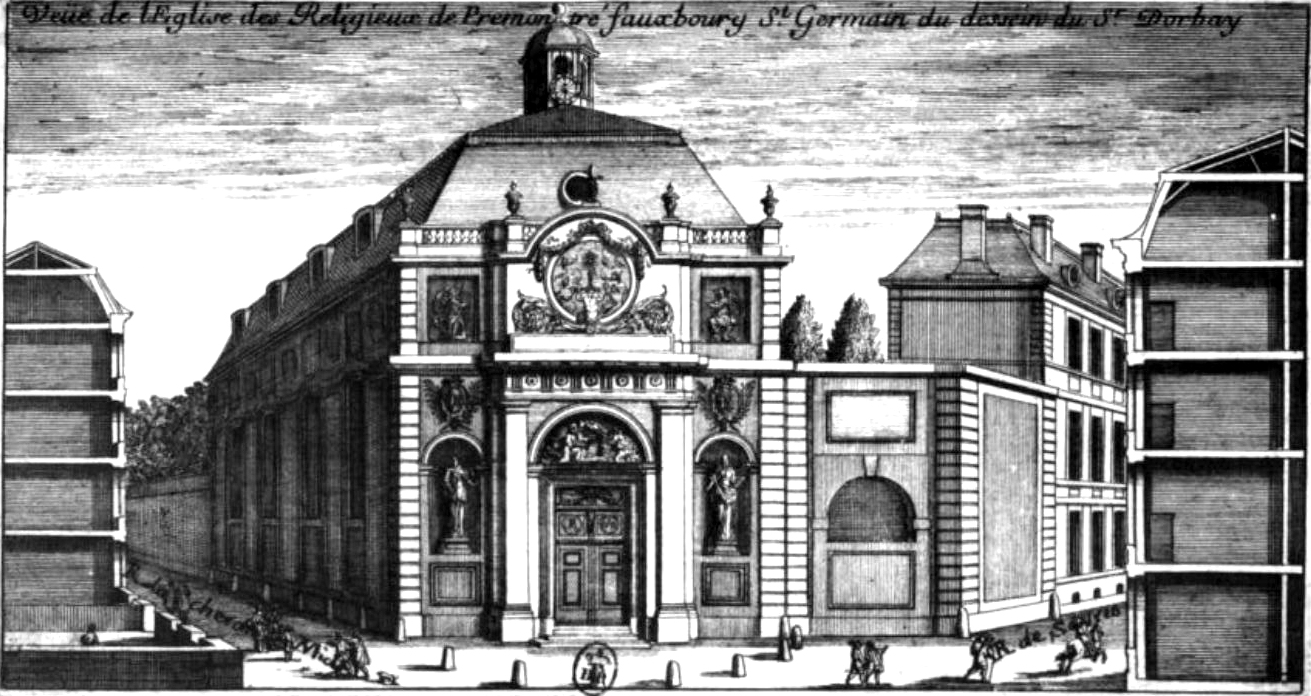
Église des Réligieux de Prémontré (1662; demolished 1719)

Commissioned by Anne of Austria, d'Orbay designed and built the entrance to the church of the convent of the Prémontrés de la Croix-Rouge in 1662. A friend, the sculptor Étienne Le Hongre, executed the patron's coat of arms and the bas-relief of the attic (The Eucharist Carried by Angels). The church was located between the rue de Sèvres and the rue du Cherche-Midi in the Faubourg Saint-Germain, but was demolished in 1719.

In 1663 d'Orbay received an official post with the Bâtiments du Roi, working mainly as a draughtsman under Le Vau, the Premier Architecte du Roi. D'Orbay produced numerous drawings for the Louvre, Versailles, and the Collège des Quatre-Nations. After Le Vau's death in 1670, d'Orbay was left in charge of completing much of the ongoing work, sometimes introducing significant changes to Le Vau's original designs.

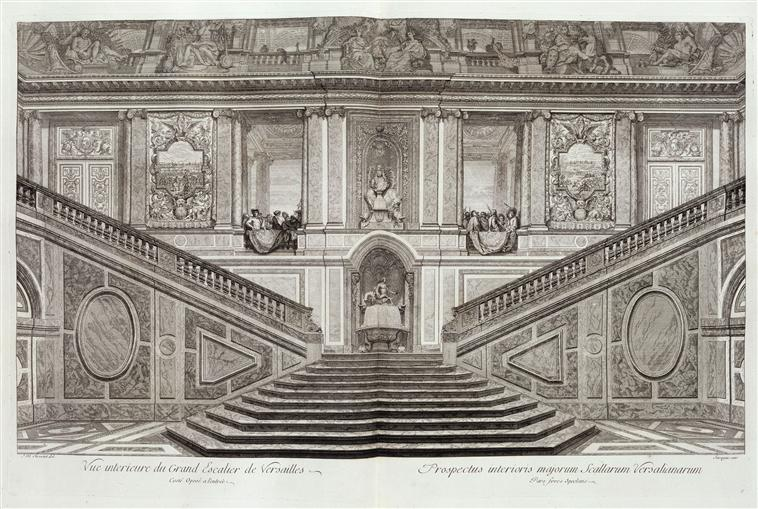
Escalier des Ambassadeurs at Versailles (1671–1680; demolished 1752)

At Versailles he is thought to have been primarily responsible for the design of the Escalier des Ambassadeurs (decorated by Charles Le Brun), although d'Orbay apparently relied very heavily on an earlier design by Claude Perrault for a stairway at the Louvre.

In 1671 d'Orbay became one of the founding members of the Académie Royale d'Architecture and that same year designed the portal of the Hôpital de la Trinité (destroyed), rue Saint-Denis, Paris.

In 1960 the French architect Albert Laprade brought d'Orbay from relative obscurity into the limelight by publishing a monograph in which he proposed that d'Orbay was the actual designer of most of the important French architecture projects carried out from 1660 to 1697, including the Louvre Colonnade and the Envelope of Versailles. However, several architectural historians have subsequently disputed most of Laprade's arguments. For instance, many of the drawings used as evidence are by other hands. It has also been noted that after Le Vau's death, d'Orbay was passed over and not promoted into Le Vau's post, which remained vacant. Jules Hardouin Mansart was made principal architect of Versailles in 1678, after which d'Orbay resumed his former job as draughtsman (now under Mansart). Mansart was promoted to Premier Architecte du Roi in 1681.

== Late career ==
D'Orbay did however execute some independent work in the latter part of his career:

- Carmelite Church in Lyon (1680–1682; destroyed)
- Theatre of the Comédie-Française on the rue des Fossés-Saint-Germain-des-Prés (now the rue de l'Ancienne Comédie) in Paris (1688–1689; destroyed)
- Arc de Triomphe du Peyrou in Montpellier (designed in 1690; built by Augustin-Charles d'Aviler)
- Montauban Cathedral (designed 1692; built 1692–1739, after 1697 by Hardouin-Mansart and Robert de Cotte, with modifications)

D'Orbay died in Paris.
