= Pierre Le Gros the Elder =

French sculptor

Pierre Le Gros
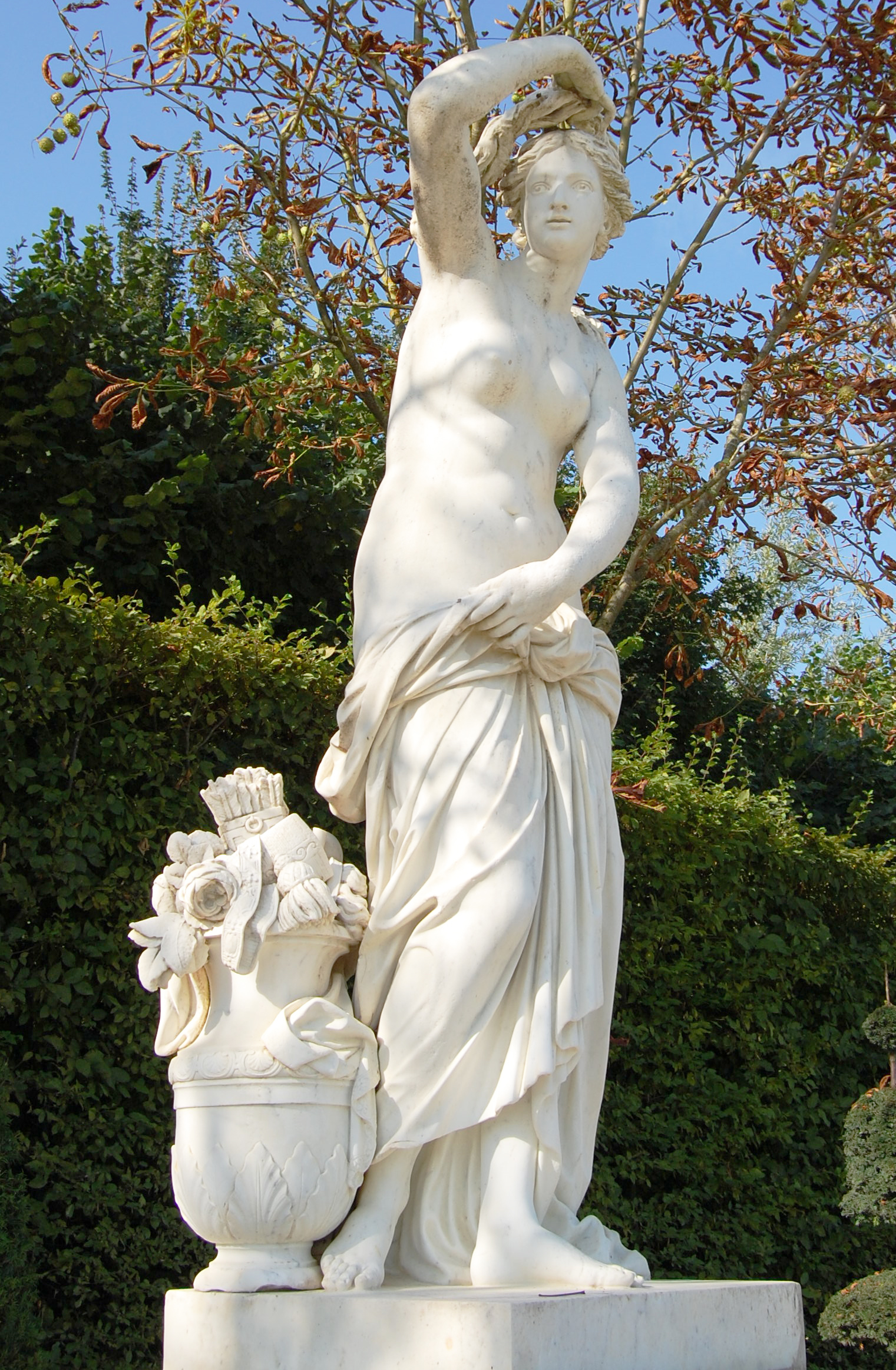
- Vénus sortant du Bain, 1685-89, Gardens of Versailles
- Born: Chartres
- Baptised: May 27, 1629
- Died: May 11, 1714 (aged 84); Paris
- Occupation: Sculptor
- Style: Baroque

Pierre Le Gros the Elder (baptised 27 May 1629 Chartres – died 11 May 1714 Paris) was a French sculptor in the service of King Louis XIV.

== Early life ==
Le Gros was born at Chartres then part of the Orléanais.

== Family ==
His first wife, Jeanne (married 1663), was the sister of the sculptors Gaspard and Balthazard Marsy, and gave him a son, the better known Pierre Le Gros the Younger who worked almost entirely in Rome. Shortly after Jeanne's early death in 1668, he married in 1669 his second wife Marie, the daughter of the builder and architect Jean le Pautre and niece of the engraver Jean le Pautre. With her, he had another son, Jean (1671-1745), who was to become a portrait painter.

== Life ==
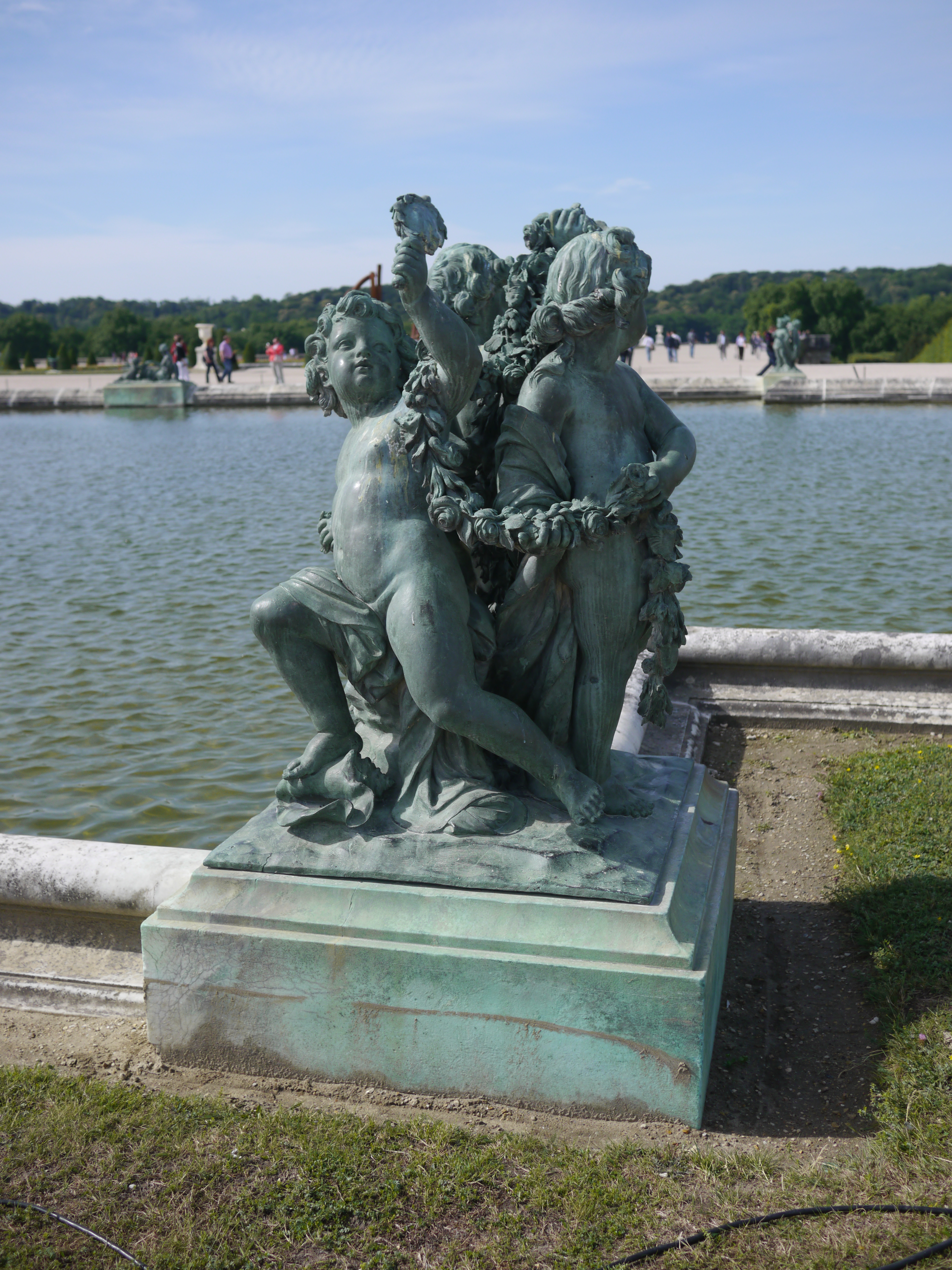
Children with Mirror, 1685–86, Versailles, Park, Bassin du Midi

In Paris, Le Gros entered the workshop of Jacques Sarazin as a pupil and later close assistant. He was working on the large funeral monument for the heart of the prince de Condé in the 1650s and, after Sarazin's death in 1660, took on the responsibility to erect the monument in the chapelle St.-Ignace of the Jesuit church Saint-Paul-Saint-Louis, achieved in 1663 (later moved to the Musée Condé in Chantilly where it was installed in a different form). For the same chapel, he did some more figurative work in 1664 and again in 1677-78 (all destroyed).

In 1663, Le Gros was made an associate ("agréé"), 1666 a member of the Académie royale de peinture et de sculpture with his reception piece, a marble medaillon of St. Peter (1664–66, Church of Notre-Dame, Versailles), and in 1702 he became professor.

His lifelong work for the Bâtiments du Roi started in 1666 with payments for specific commissions; from 1674 to 1713 he additionally received an annual salary, and at some point was also given a studio in the Louvre Palace.

His first works for the Gardens of Versailles, 1668–70, were six of the fourteen Marmousets (fountains with groups of children) of gilded lead along the Allée d'Eau, followed until 1680 by several more. Many of these were replaced by bronze replicas in 1688 while the originals were moved to Marly where they were later destroyed. Le Gros' Putti Playing with a Lyre of 1672-73 are now in the National Gallery of Art, Washington DC. He also produced Aesop and figures of animals from his fables, 1672–76, for the park's labyrinth.

On a more ambitious scale is the over lifesize marble figure L'Eau (Water) from 1675 to 1681 as part of the "Grande Commande". While following a sketch by Charles Le Brun, Le Gros was given plenty of freedom in working out details for himself (the original sculpture is today inside the palace, a copy is in the park). The same is true for his Vénus sortant du Bain (Venus stepping out of the Bath, 1685–89), loosely based on an antique sculpture, and Le Point du Jour (Daybreak, 1686–96) which follows a model by François Girardon. Other than in marble, he also worked in bronze on a life size scale with the groups of Nymphs and children for the Parterre d'Eau, 1685–86. He was also involved in the production of large decorative vases etc.

Like all work for the king, the Porte Saint-Martin in Paris was a highly coordinated collaborative project. The design for the triumphal arch by Pierre Bullet left some enormous spandrels for history scenes in relief which were executed from 1675 to 1677 by Etienne Le Hongre, Martin Desjardins, Gaspard Marsy and Le Gros whose subject was the highly up to date episode The Capture of Limbourg, a historic event which only took place in 1675. Much of his other works in Paris was for the Dôme des Invalides, mostly architectural sculpture (1690-1701) and the relief Saint Louis Serving the Poor (1691–93).

Not much details are known about Le Gros' work in Saint-Cloud from 1706 to 1711 for the elector of Bavaria, Maximilian II Emanuel who found refuge there for a period of time. The four herm statues of the Seasons in the Louvre, attributed to Le Gros, might be connected to this campaign.

== Gallery ==
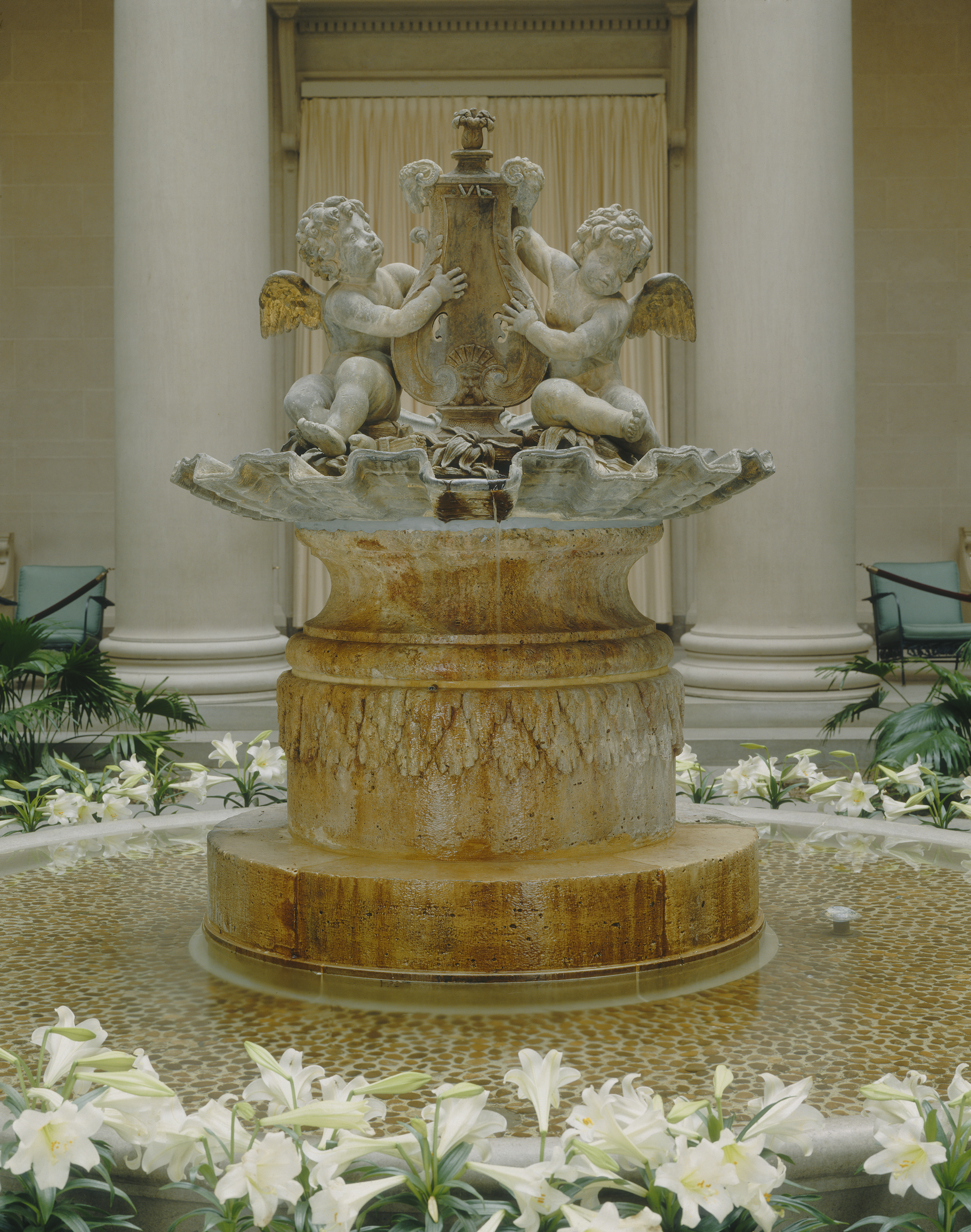
Putti Playing with a Lyre, 1672–73, Washington, National Gallery of Art

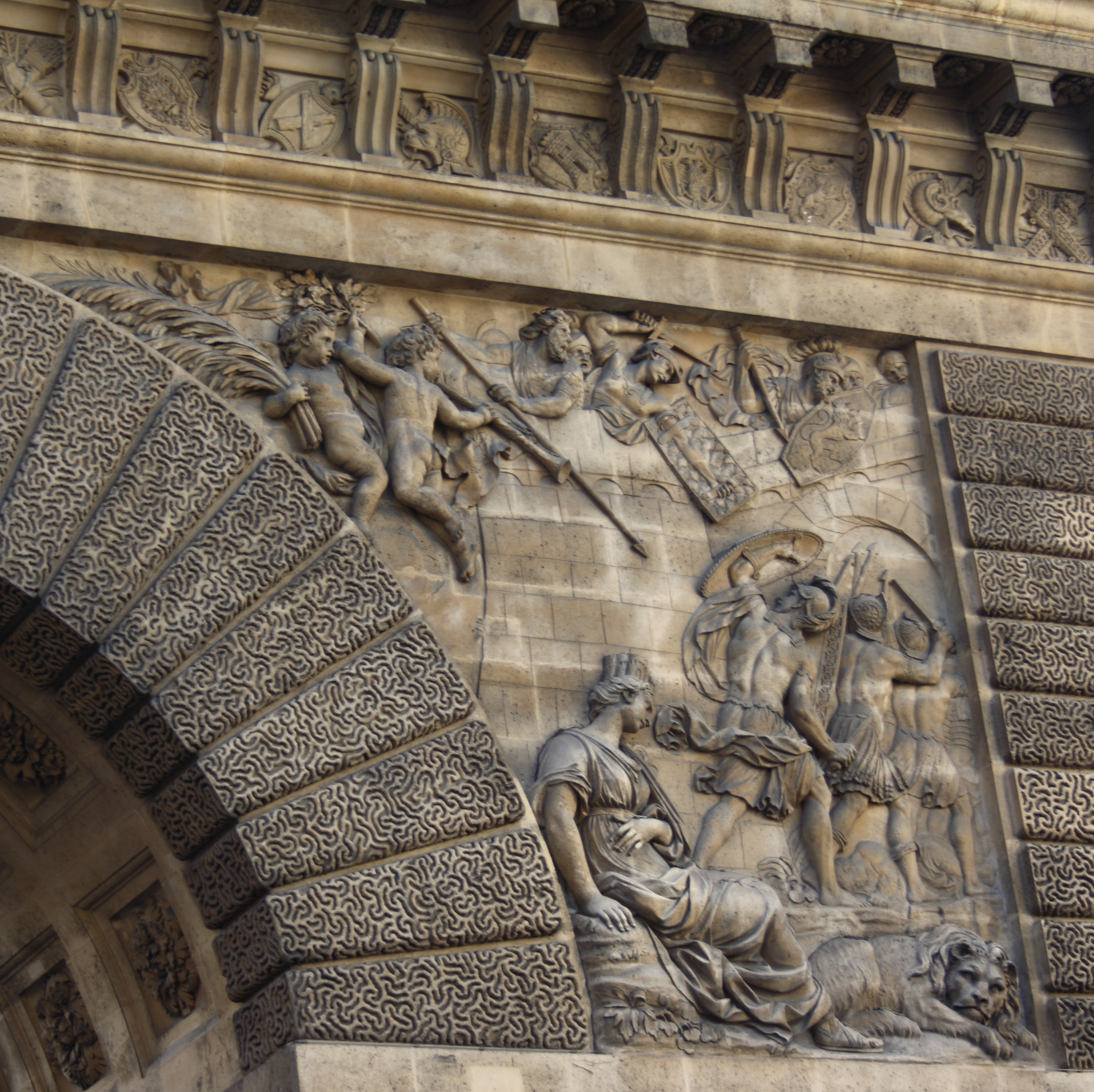
The Capture of Limbourg, 1675–77, Paris, Porte Saint-Martin

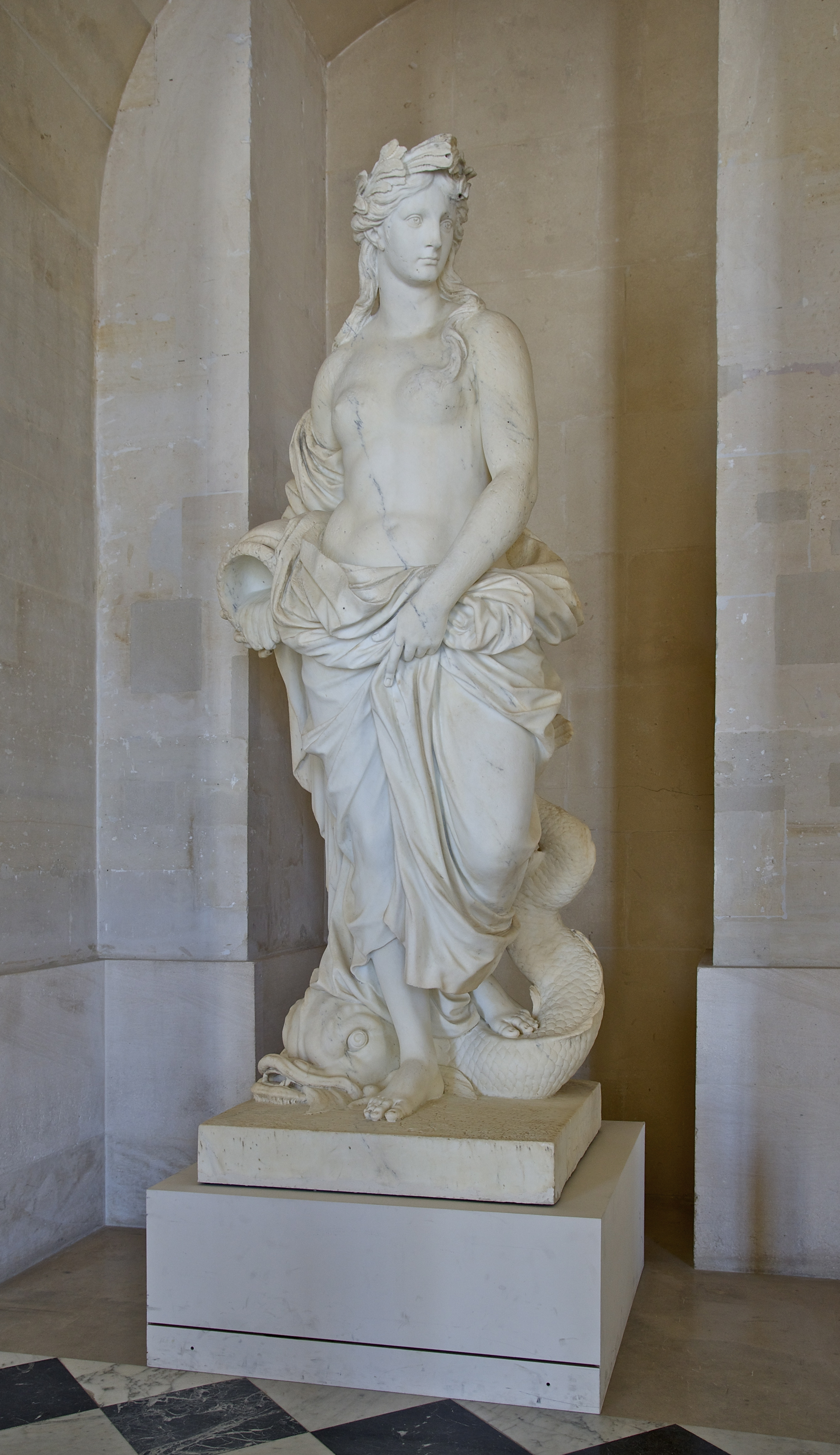
L'Eau, 1675–81, Palace of Versailles

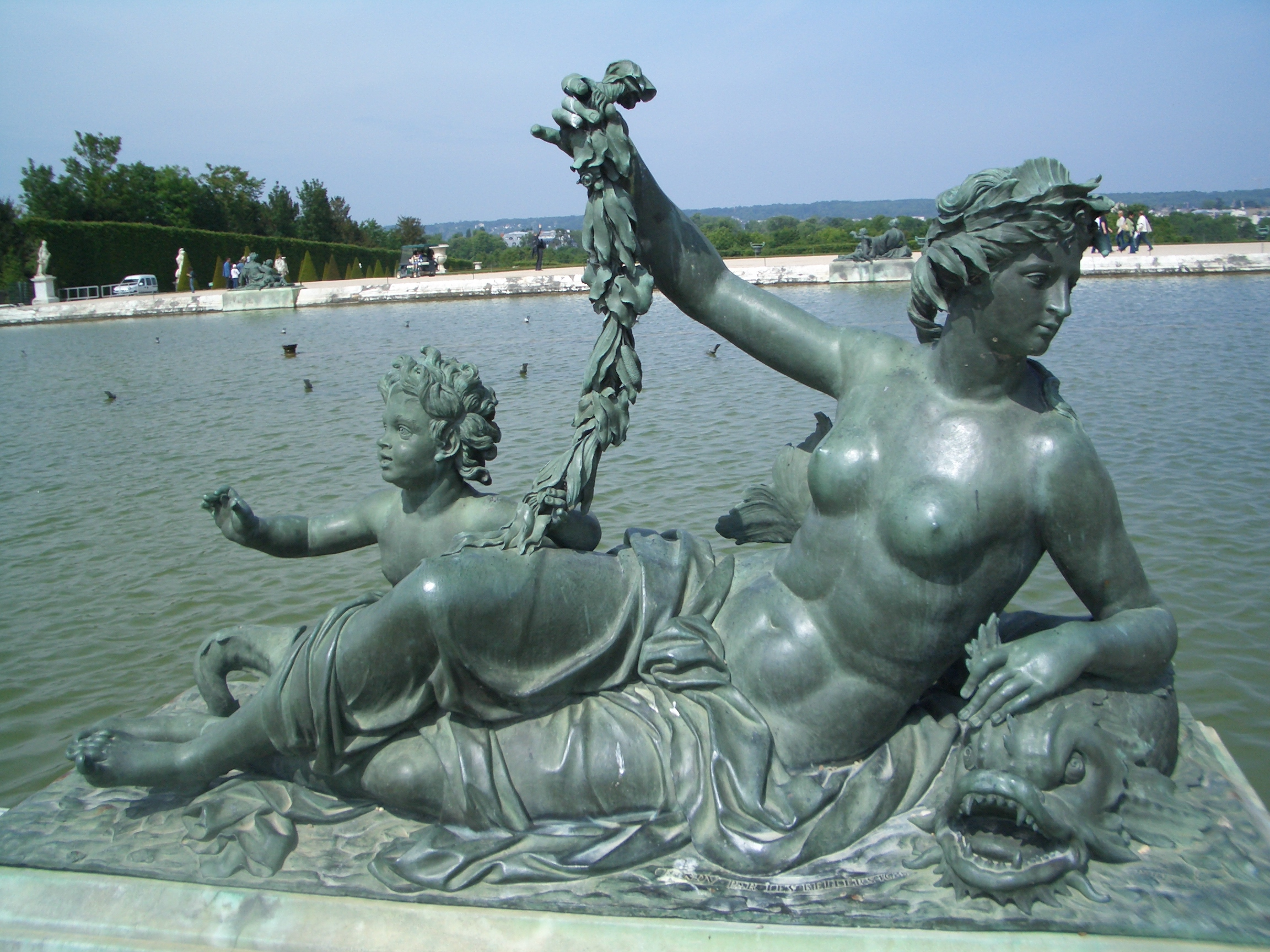
Nymphe with Child Triton, 1685–86, Versailles, Park, Bassin du Nord

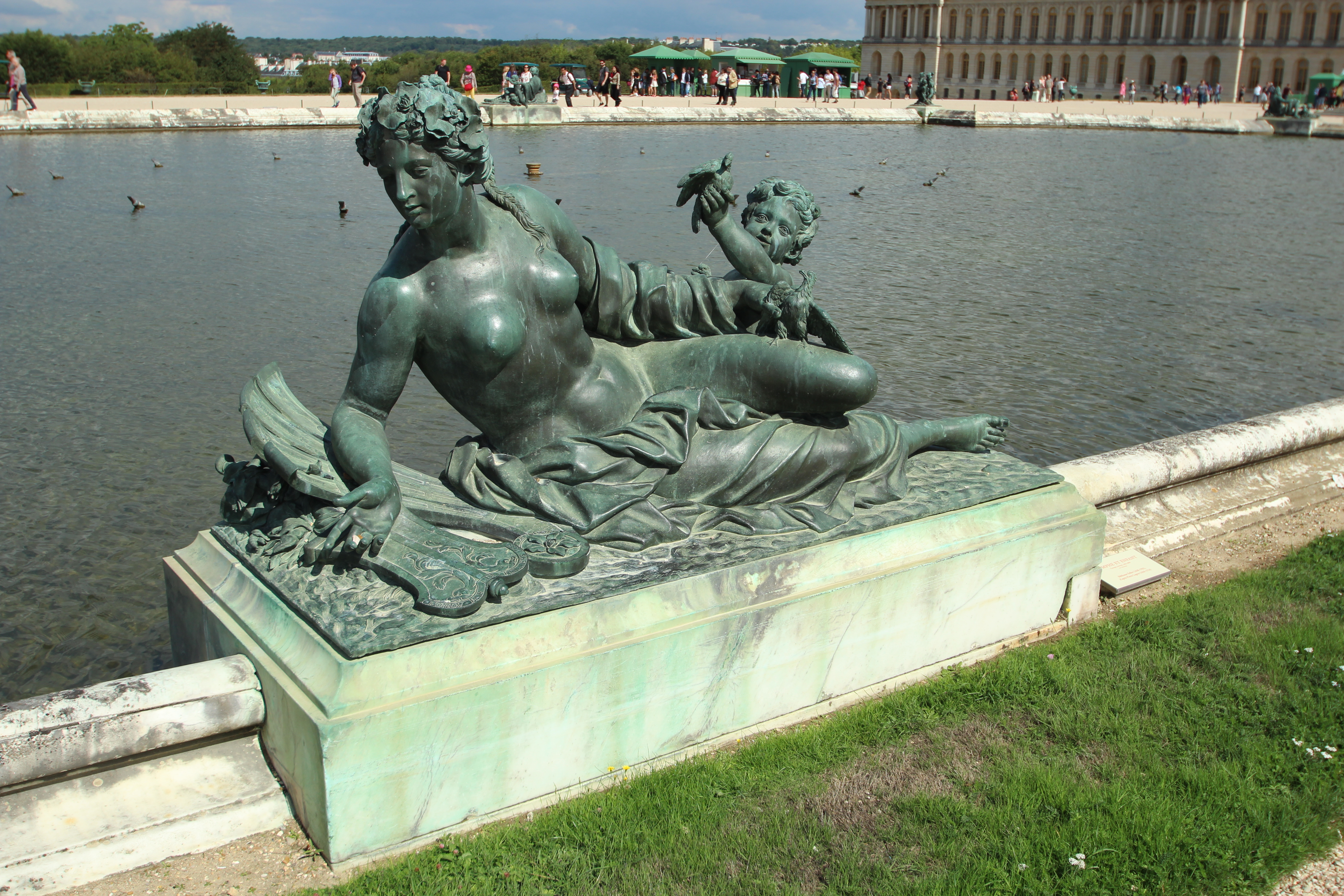
Nymphe with Bird, 1685–86, Versailles, Park, Bassin du Nord

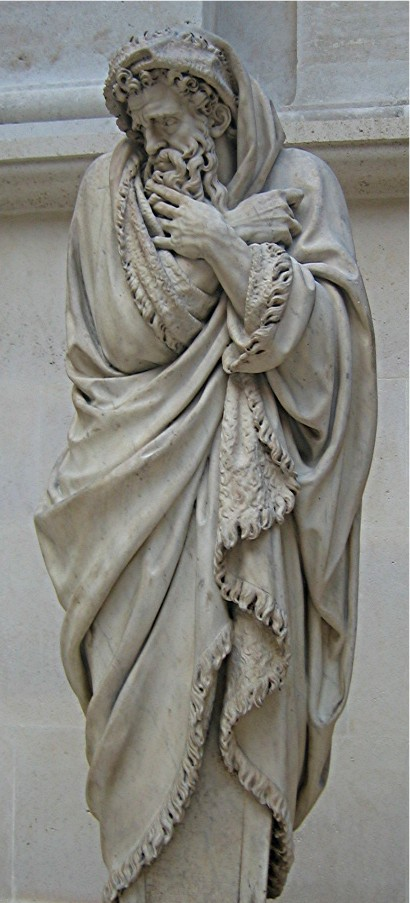
Winter, attributed to Le Gros, Louvre
