= Collège des Quatre-Nations =

Former college of the University of Paris

Coordinates: 48°51′26.3″N 2°20′13.0″E

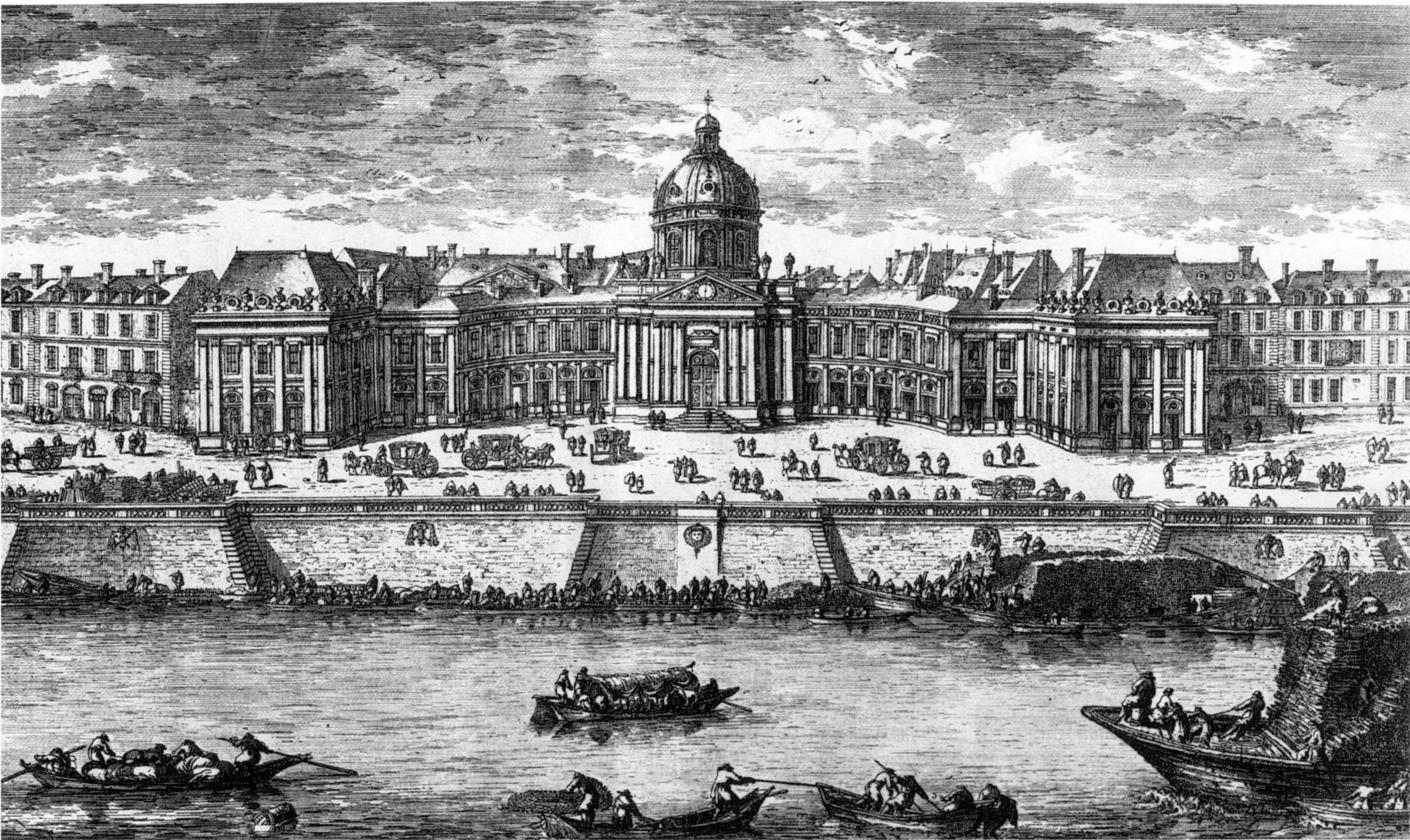
The Collège des Quatre-Nations. Etching by Perelle, ca. 1680.

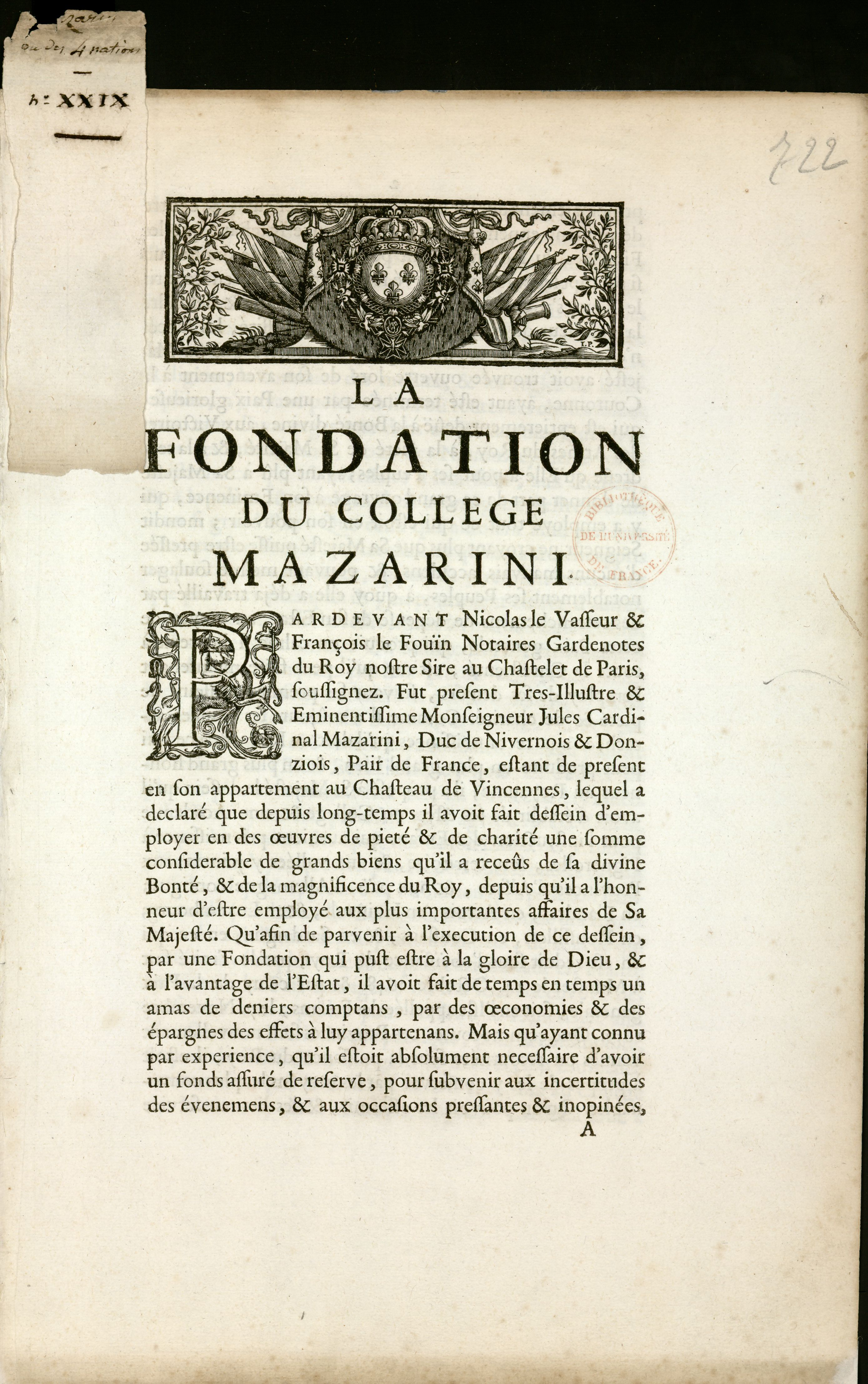
Collège des Quatre-Nations (formerly known as the Collège Mazarin): foundation and statutes. Print, 17th century (Bibliothèque de la Sorbonne, NuBIS)

The Collège des Quatre-Nations ("College of the Four Nations"), also known as the Collège Mazarin after its founder, was one of the colleges of the historic University of Paris. It was founded through a bequest by the Cardinal Mazarin. At his death in 1661, he also bequeathed his library, the Bibliothèque Mazarine, which he had opened to scholars since 1643, to the Collège des Quatre-Nations.

== Name and composition of the college ==
The name of the college alludes to the four nations of students at the medieval Parisian university. It was not intended for students of the historical university nations, but for those coming from territories which had recently come under French rule through the Peace of Westphalia (1648) and the Treaty of the Pyrenees (1659).

According to the Cardinal's will it was to have the following composition:

- Flanders, Artois, Hainaut, and Luxembourg (20 students);
- Alsace and other Germanic territories (15);
- Pignerol and the Papal states (15);
- Roussillon, Conflent, and Cerdagne (10).

== Design and construction ==
Jean-Baptiste Colbert, who was one of five executors of Mazarin's estate, contrived to get the college built, appointing Louis Le Vau as the architect. Le Vau, who at the time was also working on the south wing of the Cour Carrée of the Palais du Louvre (facing the River Seine), proposed that the college be placed directly across the river on the Left Bank, so that the sovereign (Louis XIV) would have a fine view of it from his future apartments. The site was available because of the planned demolition of the Tour de Nesle and adjacent moat and wall of Philippe Auguste. Le Vau's quickly drawn plans were pronounced "fort beau" ("quite beautiful") by the king, and construction began in 1662 and continued up to Le Vau's death in 1670, when it was taken over by his draftsman, François d'Orbay. The college opened in 1688. In accordance with Mazarin's will, his tomb is in the college chapel.

== Notable alumni ==
Notable students of the college include the encyclopedist Jean le Rond d'Alembert (1717–1783), the actor Henri Louis Cain (1728–1778), the painter Jacques-Louis David (1748–1825), the critic Julien Louis Geoffroy (1743–1814), the chemist Antoine-Laurent Lavoisier (1743–1794), and the mathematician Adrien-Marie Legendre (1752–1833).

== Later history ==
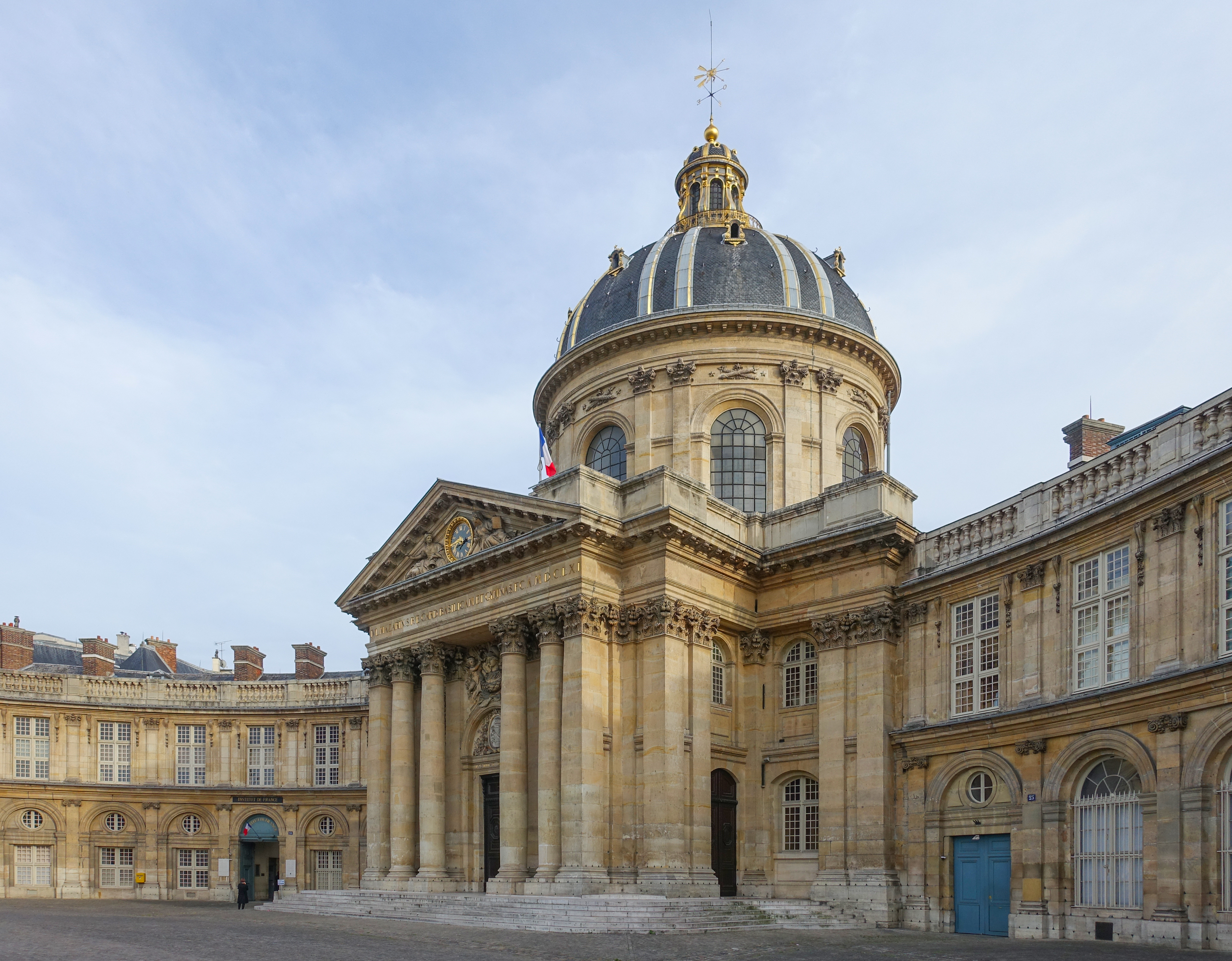
The Institut de France is housed in the former building of the Collège des Quatre-Nations.

After the colleges were suppressed during the French Revolution, the complex was used for various purposes until 1805, when it was given to the Institut de France. It has since become known as the Palais de l'Institut de France.

== Bibliography ==
- Ayers, Andrew (2004). The Architecture of Paris. Stuttgart; London: Edition Axel Menges. ISBN 9783930698967.
- Babelon, Jean-Pierre (2001). "Louis Le Vau at the Collège Mazarin: Rome in Paris?" at the Wayback Machine (archived 27 September 2011) originally at the website of the Institut de France (PDF); Paper read by Jean-Pierre Babelon to the Académie des beaux-arts, on 25 April 2001.
- Ballon, Hilary (1999). Louis Le Vau: Mazarin's Collège, Colbert's Revenge. Princeton: Princeton University Press. ISBN 9780691048956.
